= Timeline of the English Civil Wars =

This is a timeline of events leading up to, culminating in, and resulting from the English Civil Wars.

== Events prior to the English Civil War ==
- 1626 – Parliament dismisses George Villiers, 1st Duke of Buckingham from command of English forces in Europe; Charles I, furious, dismisses Parliament.
- 1628 – Charles recalls Parliament; Parliament draws up Petition of Right which Charles reluctantly accepts. John Felton murders George Villiers in Portsmouth.
- 1629 – Charles dismisses Parliament and does not call it again until 1640, thus commencing the Personal Rule
- 1633 – William Laud appointed Archbishop of Canterbury.
- 1637 – Charles attempts to impose Anglican services on the Presbyterian Church of Scotland, Jenny Geddes reacts starting a tumult which leads to the National Covenant.
- 1639–1640 – Bishops' Wars start in Scotland.

=== 1640 ===
- 13 April, first meeting of the Short Parliament
- 5 May, Charles dissolves the Short Parliament
- 28 October, Charles forced to sign the Treaty of Ripon.
- 3 November, first meeting of the Long Parliament.
- 11 December, the Root and Branch Petition submitted to the Long Parliament

=== 1641 ===
- July, the Long Parliament passes "An Act for the Regulating the Privie Councell and for taking away the Court commonly called the Star Chamber"
- July, Charles returns to Scotland and accedes to all Covenanter demands
- August, the Root and Branch Bill rejected by the Long Parliament
- October, outbreak of the Irish Rebellion of 1641
- 1 December – The Grand Remonstrance is presented to the King
- December – The Long Parliament passes the Bishops Exclusion Act

=== Events of 1642 ===
- 4 January, Charles unsuccessfully attempts to personally arrest the Five Members (John Pym, John Hampden, Denzil Holles, Sir Arthur Haselrig, and William Strode) on the floor of the House of Commons
- January, on the orders of the Long Parliament, Sir John Hotham, 1st Baronet seizes the arsenal at Kingston upon Hull
- 5 February, the bishops of the Church of England are excluded from the House of Lords by the Bishops Exclusion Act
- 23 February – Henrietta Maria goes to the Netherlands with Princess Mary and the crown jewels
- 5 March, the Long Parliament passes the Militia Ordinance
- 15 March, the Long Parliament proclaims that "the People are bound by the Ordinance for the Militia, though it has not received the Royal Assent"
- April, Sir John Hotham, 1st Baronet refuses the king entrance to Kingston upon Hull
- May – The Irish rebellion ends
- 2 June – The Nineteen Propositions rejected
- 3 June, The great meeting on Heworth Moor outside York, summoned by Charles to garner support for his cause.
- July, Charles I of England unsuccessfully besieged Hull
- July, Parliament appoints the Committee of Safety
- 29 September The Treaty of Neutrality (Yorkshire) signed by Lord Fairfax for Parliament and Henry Bellasis for the Royalists
- 23 October Battle of Edgehill
- 1 December Battle of Piercebridge
- 7 December Battle of Tadcaster
- 18 December First Sieges of Bradford (Battle of the Steeple)

== The First English Civil War ==
=== Events of 1643 ===
- 19 January, Battle of Braddock Down
- 23 January, Battle of Leeds
- 28 January, the Long Parliament sends commissioners to negotiate the Treaty of Oxford (unsuccessful)
- 19 March, Battle of Hopton Heath
- 30 March, Battle of Seacroft Moor
- 3 April, Battle of Camp Hill — a Royalist victory
- 8–21 April, Siege of Lichfield — a Royalist capture
- 25 April, Battle of Sourton Down — Parliamentarian victory
- 16 May, Battle of Stratton — Royalist victory
- 21 May, Thomas Fairfax launches an attack on the Royalist garrison at Wakefield to take prisoners in exchange for the men lost at Seacroft Moor
- 29–31 May, Siege of Worcester — Parliamentarians failed to capture
- 16 June, the Long Parliament passes the Licensing Order
- 18 June, Battle of Chalgrove Field — John Hampden was mortally wounded during the Battle and died on Saturday evening of 24 June 1643.
- 30 June, Battle of Adwalton Moor
- 1 July, first meeting of the Westminster Assembly
- 2 July Second Sieges of Bradford
- 4 July, Battle of Burton Bridge
- 5 July, Battle of Lansdowne (or Lansdown) fought near Bath.
- 13 July, Battle of Roundway Down fought near Devizes
- 20 July, Battle of Gainsborough
- 26 July, Storming of Bristol
- 17 August, the Church of Scotland ratifies the Solemn League and Covenant
- 2 September, Beginning of Siege of Hull (1643)
- 18 September, Battle of Aldbourne Chase
- 20 September, First Battle of Newbury
- 25 September, the Long Parliament and the Westminster Assembly ratify the Solemn League and Covenant. Under the terms of the deal with Scotland, the Committee of Safety is superseded by the Committee of Both Kingdoms
- 11 October, Battle of Winceby

=== Events of 1644 ===
The Scots marched South and joined Parliament's army threatening York.

- 26 January, Battle of Nantwich
- 3 February, Siege of Newcastle, formal request to surrender to the Scots.
- 29 March, Battle of Cheriton
- 28 May, Storming of Bolton and the Bolton Massacre
- 29 June, Battle of Cropredy Bridge
- 2 July, Battle of Marston Moor
- 13 September, Second Battle of Aberdeen
- 19 October, Siege of Newcastle ends with the storming of the city by Scottish soldiers
- 24 October, the Long Parliament passes the Ordinance of no quarter to the Irish
- 27 October, Second Battle of Newbury
- 23 November, first publication of Areopagitica by John Milton
- 4 November, the Long Parliament sends the Propositions of Uxbridge to the king at Oxford

=== Events of 1645 ===
- 6 January, the Committee of Both Kingdoms orders the creation of the New Model Army
- 28 January, the Long Parliament appoints commissioners to meet with the king's commissioners at Uxbridge
- 22 February, negotiations over the Treaty of Uxbridge end unsuccessfully
- February–July, Great Siege of Scarborough Castle
- 23 April, the Long Parliament passes the Self-denying Ordinance
- 9 May, Battle of Auldearn
- 30 May, Siege and sacking of Leicester
- 14 June, Battle of Naseby
- 2 July, Battle of Alford
- 10 July, Battle of Langport
- 15 August, Battle of Kilsyth
- 13 September, Battle of Philiphaugh
- 24 September, Battle of Rowton Heath
- Surrender of Leicester
- October fear of Royalist attack in south Lincolnshire
- Charles went to Welbeck, Nottinghamshire
- 17 December Siege of Hereford ended with the surrender of Royalist garrison.

=== Events of 1646 ===
- 18 January, Siege of Dartmouth ended with the surrender of Royalist garrison.
- 3 February, Siege of Chester ended with the surrender of Royalist garrison after a 136-day siege.
- 16 February, Battle of Torrington victory for the New Model Army
- 10 March, Ralph Hopton surrenders the Royalist army at Tresillian bridge in Cornwall.
- 21 March, Battle of Stow-on-the-Wold the last pitched battle of the First Civil War is a victory for the New Model Army
- 13 April, Siege of Exeter ended with the surrender of Royalist garrison.
- 5 May, Charles surrendered to a Scottish army at Southwell, Nottinghamshire
- 6 May, Newark fell to the Parliamentarians
- 24 June, Siege of Oxford ended with the surrender of Royalist garrison.
- 22 July, Siege of Worcester ended with the surrender of Royalist garrison.
- 27 July, after a 65-day siege, Wallingford Castle, the last English royalist stronghold, surrenders to Sir Thomas Fairfax.
- 19 August, Royalist garrison of Raglan Castle surrendered (Wales)
- 9 October, the Long Parliament passes the Ordinance for the abolishing of Archbishops and Bishops in England and Wales and for settling their lands and possessions upon Trustees for the use of the Commonwealth

=== Events of 1647 ===
- 13 March, Harlech Castle the last Royalist stronghold in Wales surrendered to the Parliamentary forces.
- 29 May, General Council of the Army drew-up the Solemn Engagement
- 3 June, Cornet George Joyce (a junior officer in Fairfax's horse) with a troop of New Model Army cavalry seizes the King from his Parliamentary guards at Holdenby House and place him in protective custody of the New Model Army
- 4–5 June, at a rendezvoused on Kentford Heath near Newmarket the officers and men of the New Model Army gave their assent to the Solemn Engagement
- 8 June, General Fairfax sent the Solemn Engagement to Parliament along with a letter explaining that the King was now in the custody of the Army negotiations would be conducted through New Model Army representatives
- 1 August, General Council of the Army offers the Heads of Proposals
- 31 August, Montrose escaped from the Highlands
- October, "An Agreement of the People for a firm and present peace upon grounds of common right", presented to the Army Council
- 28 October, Beginning of the Putney Debates. Ended 11 November.
- 26 December, a faction of Scottish Covenanters sign The Engagement with Charles I

== The Second English Civil War ==
=== Events of 1648 ===
- 8 May, Battle of St. Fagans
- 16 May(?) – 11 July Siege of Pembroke
- 1 June, Battle of Maidstone
- 13 June – 28 August, Siege of Colchester
- 17 August – 19 August, Battle of Preston
- 19 August, Battle of Winwick
- 28 August, On the evening of the surrender of Colchester, Royalists Sir Charles Lucas and Sir George Lisle were shot
- 15 September, Treaty of Newport
- November, leaders in the army draft the Remonstrance of the Army
- 6 December, Pride's Purge, when troops under Colonel Thomas Pride removed opponents of Oliver Cromwell from Parliament by force of arms resulting in Rump Parliament

=== Events of 1649 ===
- 15 January, "An Agreement of the People of England, and the places therewith incorporated, for a secure and present peace, upon grounds of common right, freedom and safety" presented to the Rump Parliament
- 20 January, The trial of Charles I of England by the High Court of Justice begins
- 27 January, The death warrant of Charles I of England is signed
- 30 January, Charles I of England executed by beheading – the Rump Parliament passes Act prohibiting the proclaiming any person to be King of England or Ireland, or the Dominions thereof
- 5 February, The eldest son of Charles I, Charles, Prince of Wales, was proclaimed "king of Great Britain, France and Ireland" by the Scottish Parliament at the Mercat Cross, Edinburgh.
- 7 February, The Rump Parliament votes to abolish the English monarchy
- 9 February, publication of Eikon Basilike, allegedly by Charles I of England
- 14 February, the Rump Parliament creates the English Council of State
- February, Charles II proclaimed king of Great Britain, France and Ireland by Hugh, Viscount Montgomery and other Irish Royalists at Newtownards in Ulster.
- 9 March, Engager Duke of Hamilton, Royalist Earl of Holland, and Royalist Lord Capel were beheaded at Westminster
- 17 March, an Act abolishing the kingship is formally passed by the Rump Parliament.
- 24 March, The capitulation of Pontefract Castle which, even after the death of Charles I, remained loyal to Charles II
- 1 May, "AN AGREEMENT OF THE Free People of England. Tendered as a Peace-Offering to this distressed Nation" extended version from the Leveller leaders, "Lieutenant Colonel John Lilburne, Master William Walwyn, Master Thomas Prince (Leveller), and Master Richard Overton, Prisoners in the Tower of London, May the 1. 1649."
- October, first publication of Eikonoklastes by John Milton, a rebuttal of Eikon Basilike

== English invasion of Scotland ==
=== Events of 1650 ===
- 1 May, Treaty of Breda signed between Charles II and the Scottish Covenanters
- 23 June, Charles II signs the Solemn League and Covenant
- 3 September, Battle of Dunbar, Scotland
- 1 December, Battle of Hieton, Scotland (skirmish)

=== Events of 1651 ===
- 1 January, Charles II crowned King of Scots at Scone
- 20 July, Battle of Inverkeithing
- 25 August, Battle of Wigan Lane (skirmish)
- 28 August, Battle of Upton (the start of the western encirclement of Worcester)
- 3 September, Battle of Worcester
- 3 September, the start of the escape of Charles II
- 6 September, Charles II spends the day hiding in the Royal Oak in the woodlands surrounding Boscobel House
- 16 October, Charles II landed in Normandy, France, after successfully fleeing England

== Events after the English Civil War ==
approximate deathcount: royalists: 50,000. parliamentarians: 34,000

- 1650–1660, English Interregnum
  - 1649–1653, The first period of the Commonwealth of England
  - 20 April 1653, The Rump Parliament disbanded by Oliver Cromwell
  - 1653–1658, The Protectorate under Oliver Cromwell
  - 25 March 1655, Battle of the Severn was fought in the Province of Maryland and was won by a Puritan force fighting under a Commonwealth flag who defeated a Royalist force fighting for Lord Baltimore
  - 13 April 1657, Oliver Cromwell declines the crown of England
  - 3 September 1658, Death of Oliver Cromwell
  - 1658–1659, The Protectorate under Richard Cromwell
  - 7 May 1659, Rump Parliament restored by Richard Cromwell
  - 25 May 1659, Richard Cromwell delivered a formal letter resigning the position of Lord Protector
  - 13 October 1659, Rump Parliament disbanded again
  - 1659–1660, The second period of the Commonwealth of England
- 1660, English Restoration and the return of King Charles II of England
  - 30 January 1660, Charles II proclaimed King of England
  - March 1660, Convention Parliament elected
  - 4 April 1660, Charles II issued the Declaration of Breda, which made known the conditions of his acceptance of the crown of England
  - 25 April 1660, Convention Parliament assembled for the first time
  - 29 May 1660, Charles II arrives in London and the English monarchy is restored
  - July 1660, Richard Cromwell left England for the Kingdom of France where he went by a variety of pseudonyms, including "John Clarke"
  - 29 December 1660, Convention Parliament disbanded by Charles II
  - 23 April 1661, coronation of Charles II at Westminster Abbey
  - 1660–1662, The trials and executions of the regicides of Charles I
  - 30 January 1661, On the 12th anniversary of the beheading of Charles I, the exhumed remains of Oliver Cromwell were posthumously executed (Cromwell's severed head was displayed on a pole outside Westminster Hall until 1685)

== See also ==
- Chronology of the Wars of the Three Kingdoms
- Cornwall in the English Civil War
- Shropshire in the English Civil War
- Timeline of the Wars of the Three Kingdoms (1639–1651)
- Worcestershire in the English Civil War

== Notes ==
Some of the information on this page could be different or similar to other websites.
