= Thomas Rainsborough =

English religious and political radical (1610–1648)

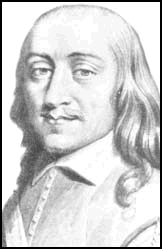
- Thomas Rainsborough

Commander of Parliamentarian navy Captain of Deal Castle
- In office September 1647 – May 1648

Member of Parliament for Droitwich
- In office January 1647 – October 1648

Parliamentarian Governor of Worcester
- In office July 1646 – April 1647

Personal details
- Born: 6 July 1610 Wapping, Middlesex, England
- Died: 29 October 1648 (aged 38) Doncaster, Yorkshire, England
- Cause of death: Assassinated
- Resting place: Cemetery attached to St John's Church, Wapping
- Spouse: Margaret Rainsborough
- Relations: William Rainsborowe, brother and Ranter
- Children: William, unnamed daughter
- Parent: William Rainsborough
- Occupation: Soldier, naval officer and radical politician

Military service
- Allegiance: Parliamentarian
- Years of service: 1642–1648
- Rank: Vice-Admiral; Colonel
- Battles/wars: Wars of the Three Kingdoms; Siege of Hull (1643); Capture of Crowland Abbey; Battle of Naseby; Recapture of Leicester; Langport; Bridgwater; Siege of Bristol (1645); Berkeley Castle; Siege of Oxford; Siege of Worcester; Siege of Colchester; Siege of Pontefract Castle

Thomas Rainsborough, or Rainborowe, 6 July 1610 to 29 October 1648, was an English religious and political radical who served in the Parliamentarian navy and New Model Army during the Wars of the Three Kingdoms. One of the few contemporaries whose personal charisma and popularity rivalled that of Oliver Cromwell, he has also been described as "a soldier of impressive professional competence and peerless courage".

He is now most famous for his participation in the 1647 Putney Debates, when he argued "the poorest hee ... in England hath a life to live, as the greatest hee."

== Personal details ==
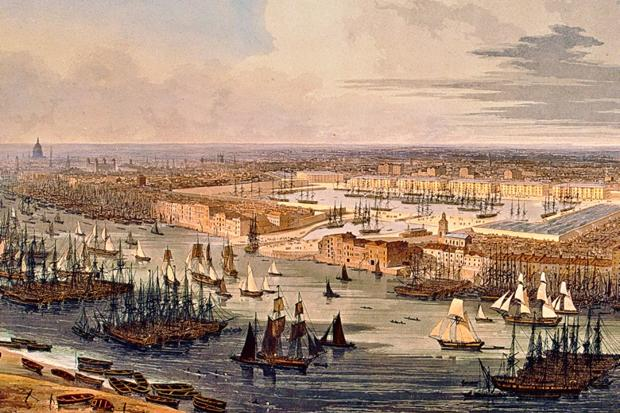
Port of Wapping, c. 1803

Thomas Rainsborough was born on 6 July 1610 in Wapping, close to the Port of London, eldest son of William Rainsborough (1587–1642). A wealthy merchant and member of the Levant Company, in 1637 William was offered but refused a baronetcy for his help in negotiating a peace treaty with Morocco. Thomas' mother had another two children before she died sometime before 1624, William Rainsborowe [sic] (1612–1673), and Martha (1617–1660). He also had three surviving half-siblings from his father's second marriage to Judith Hoxton (died 1638); Judith, Joan and Edward (1639–after 1673).

Like Oliver Cromwell and other Puritans during the period of Personal Rule from 1629 to 1640, Thomas considered emigration to New England, although he ultimately decided against it. In the late 1630s, his brother William settled in Massachusetts, as did two sisters, Martha, briefly the fourth and last wife of John Winthrop, Governor of the colony, and Judith, who married his son Stephen Winthrop. The latter returned to England in 1645 and became a colonel in the New Model Army.

Some years before his death, Thomas married a woman called Margaret about whom little is known, other than that they had a son, William, and at least one other child.

== First English Civil War ==
Like his father, Thomas Rainsborough joined the Levant company and became part of a close-knit group of Puritan merchants and sailors, many of whom were also members of Trinity House. The expansion of the Royal Navy under Charles I increased demand for experienced captains and despite being in his sixties, William Rainsborough was among those selected by the Earl of Northumberland, then Lord High Admiral. Northumberland was a Puritan sympathiser who sought to increase their influence within the fleet by recruiting officers from a similar background, Sir William Batten being another example.

When the First English Civil War began in August 1642, most of the Royal Navy declared for Parliament and Thomas was appointed captain of one of its ships with the help of his family connections. The absence of a significant Royalist navy meant the fleet was largely employed supporting coastal operations or cutting supply lines, and accompanied by his brother William, who had returned from North America, Rainsborough spent most of the first year of the war on patrol duty in the Irish Sea.

Key locations and battles mentioned in text

He left the navy in summer 1643 to join the besieged Parliamentarian garrison of Hull, and helped repulse an attack by the Marquess of Newcastle. Promoted colonel in the Army of the Eastern Association, in 1644 he was given command of a new infantry regiment, whose members included several volunteers from New England, among them his brother-in-law, Stephen Winthrop, and former Wapping neighbour, Nehemiah Bourne. In October, he led this regiment in a daring attack that captured the Royalist stronghold of Crowland Abbey in Lincolnshire.

In April 1645, Rainsborough was made colonel of an infantry regiment in the recently formed New Model Army, although his appointment was initially opposed by the moderate Presbyterians who dominated Parliament. They were concerned at the religious views of various officers nominated by Cromwell and his associates, while Rainsborough was known to be sympathetic not only to the group later known as Fifth Monarchists, but also the Anabaptists, a sect persecuted by mainstream Protestants throughout Europe. His brother William's appointment as a captain was also challenged due to his religious and political views.

Rainsborough's commission was approved in time for him to fight at the Battle of Naseby in June 1645, where his regiment helped prevent a breakthrough by Prince Rupert's cavalry. In July, he helped recapture Leicester, and then participated in the Western Campaign, fighting with distinction at Langport, and demonstrating his skill for siege warfare at Bridgwater and Bristol. After taking Berkeley Castle in December 1645, he moved onto the Siege of Oxford, which surrendered in June 1646, ending significant Royalist resistance in the First English Civil War. Rainsborough then helped conclude the Siege of Worcester and was appointed governor of the town in July 1646. He was also elected MP for the nearby constituency of Droitwich in January 1647, but retained his military commission despite the Self-denying Ordinance which required him to choose one or the other.

== The 1647 Putney Debates ==
By early 1647, the New Model Army was owed more than £300,000 in wages, an enormous sum for the period, while Parliament was struggling with a shattered economy, an outbreak of the bubonic plague, and Charles' refusal to agree a peace settlement. This mattered because moderate MPs like Denzil Holles took up arms in 1642 to ensure the king ruled in partnership with Parliament, not to remove him, and viewed radicals like Rainsborough as a greater threat than the Royalists. (Note: Their dislike was heightened when Independents within the New Model, such as Colonels John Hewson and Daniel Axtell, claimed Presbyterian ministers were "agents of the Antichrist.) Largely Presbyterian in religion, the moderate faction held a majority in Parliament, and were supported by the London Trained Bands, the Army of the Western Association, and most of the navy. This made them over-confident, and in April they passed a motion sending the New Model to Ireland, stating only those who agreed to go would be paid. When their representatives, or Agitators, demanded full payment for all in advance, the army was officially disbanded, but its leaders refused to comply.

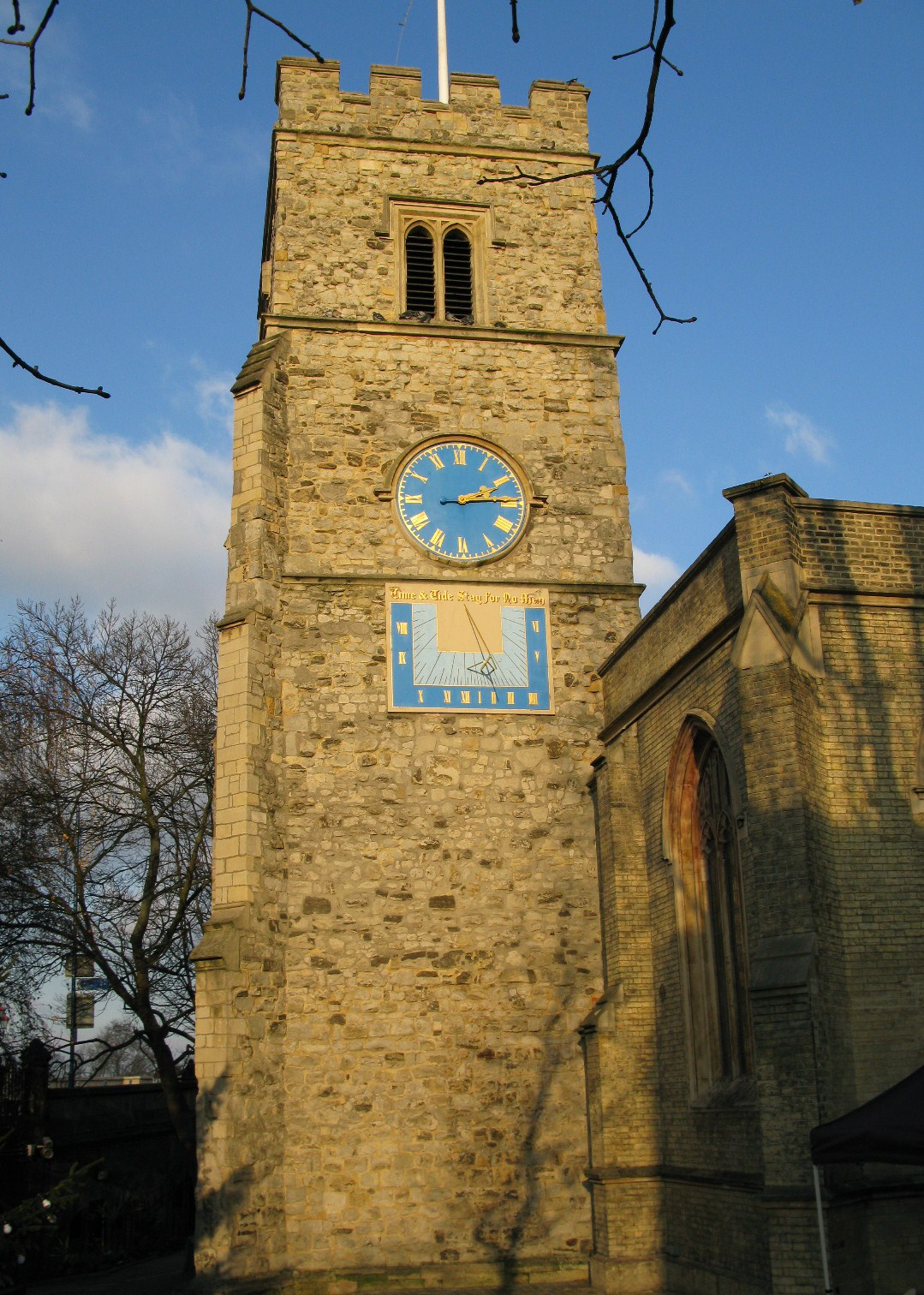
St. Mary's Church, Putney, location of the Putney Debates

His influence and reputation meant Rainsborough was co-opted onto the General Council, a body set up to protect the interests of the New Model Army. It included senior officers or "Grandees" like Cromwell and Sir Thomas Fairfax, as well as Agitators elected by their regiments, one of whom was William Rainborowe. The Council drafted their version of a peace agreement, known as the Heads of Proposals, and in July Rainsborough was part of the delegation sent to present it to Charles, who rejected the terms outright. Along with others including Colonel William Goffe, a Fifth Monarchist and later regicide, Rainsborough became convinced further negotiations with the king were pointless, and accused Cromwell of "base servility" in seeking to continue them.

In August 1647, Rainsborough and his regiment were ordered to suppress pro-Royalist riots in London, where they remained. During this period, he was involved in Leveller proposals for a constitutional settlement, subsequently set out in a pamphlet titled An Agreement of the People. Like the "Heads of Proposals", its terms included freedom of worship for non-Catholics, but went further by demanding equality before the law regardless of social standing, (Note: During the Putney Debates, Rainsborough argued "I do not find anything in the law of God that a lord shall choose 20 burgesses, and a gentleman but two, or a poor man shall choose none. I find no such thing in the law of nature, nor in the law of nations. But I do find that all Englishmen must be subject to English laws; and I do verily believe that there is no man but will say that the foundation of all law lies in the people; and if it lie in the people, I am to seek for this exemption.".) and Universal suffrage for all men over 21 years of age. Both ideas were opposed by the Grandees, who were alarmed by the growth of Leveller influence within the New Model.

Held between 28 October to 8 November 1647 at St. Mary's Church, Putney, the Putney Debates sought to agree on a unified Army position in their dispute with Parliament. The talks were dominated by Ireton, speaking for the Grandees, and Rainsborough, representing the Leveller case. Ireton dismissed universal suffrage as "mere anarchy"; (Note: It is also suggested Cromwell and other Grandees feared a free election based on universal suffrage would result in a royalist Parliament.) Rainsborough responded:

" ...for really I thinke that the poorest hee that is in England hath a life to live as the greatest hee; and therefore truly, Sir, I thinke itt's cleare, that every man that is to live under a Governement ought first by his owne consent to putt himself under that Governement; and I do think that the poorest man in England is not at all bound in a strict sense to that Government that he hath not had a voice to put Himself under." (Putney Debates record book 1647, Worcester College, Oxford, MS 65. Spelling and capitalisation as in the original manuscript.)

Convinced the Levellers threatened army discipline and unity, on 8 November the Grandees shut down the debates, ordered all Agitators back to their units and dissolved the General Council, quickly reformed as the Council of Officers. In a series of assemblies held on 15 November, all New Model regiments were required to sign an oath of loyalty to their officers; most did so without question, but there was a minor mutiny at the one held in Ware, Hertfordshire, where Rainsborough was present. He was escorted from the field since he was not entitled to attend, having relinquished his army commission in September 1647 after being made vice-admiral of the Parliamentarian navy, an appointment Parliament now revoked.

== Second English Civil War and death ==
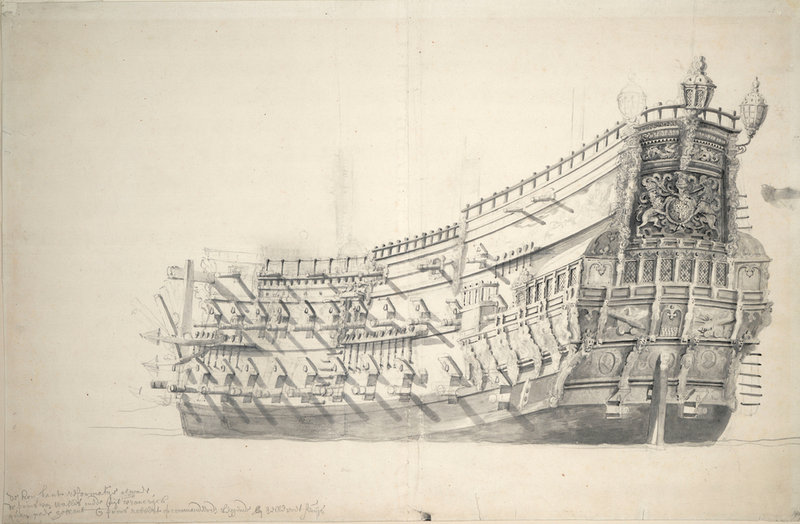
Rainsborough's flagship in 1648, the Constant Reformation

As the political situation deteriorated amid rumours of an imminent Royalist rising, the Council of Officers needed a reliable man in charge of the navy, currently headed by William Batten, a Presbyterian supporter of the Parliamentary opposition to Cromwell. In mid-December, they urged Parliament to reconfirm Rainsborough as its commander, a request that was eventually approved after some hesitation. Simultaneously appointed Captain of Deal Castle, Rainsborough took up his new positions in January 1648, using the Constant Reformation as his flagship. However, much of the fleet resented having an army officer imposed on them without discussion, especially one with his political and religious views; there was very little support for either the Levellers or religious Independents within the navy.

The Second English Civil War began in February 1648, the result of a coalition between Scots Engagers, English Royalists, and those Parliamentarians who considered the New Model a greater threat than their previous opponents. Led by William Batten, on 27 May six ships declared their support for the king, including the Constant Reformation, whose crew put Rainsborough into a small boat heading for London. Alarmed at the prospect of further defections, Parliament reinstated the Presbyterian Earl of Warwick as Lord High Admiral, a position he previously held from 1642 to 1645. Rainsborough returned to the army and joined Sir Thomas Fairfax, whose forces were besieging Colchester. Cromwell's victory over Royalist forces at Preston on 19 August made further resistance pointless, and Colchester surrendered at the end of August.

Rainsborough now moved onto the siege of Pontefract Castle, one of the last remaining Royalist strongholds. On the night of 29 October, four men broke into his house in nearby Doncaster, allegedly hoping to exchange him for the Royalist cavalry leader, Marmaduke Langdale. Rainsborough resisted and was dragged outside into the street, where he was killed, despite calling for help. In March 1649, the Leveller John Lilburne published a tract titled The Second Part of England's New Chaines Discovered, which among other things accused the Council of Officers of involvement in Rainsborough's death. A contemporary Parliamentary investigation dismissed the idea, while later historians have found no evidence to support such a theory.

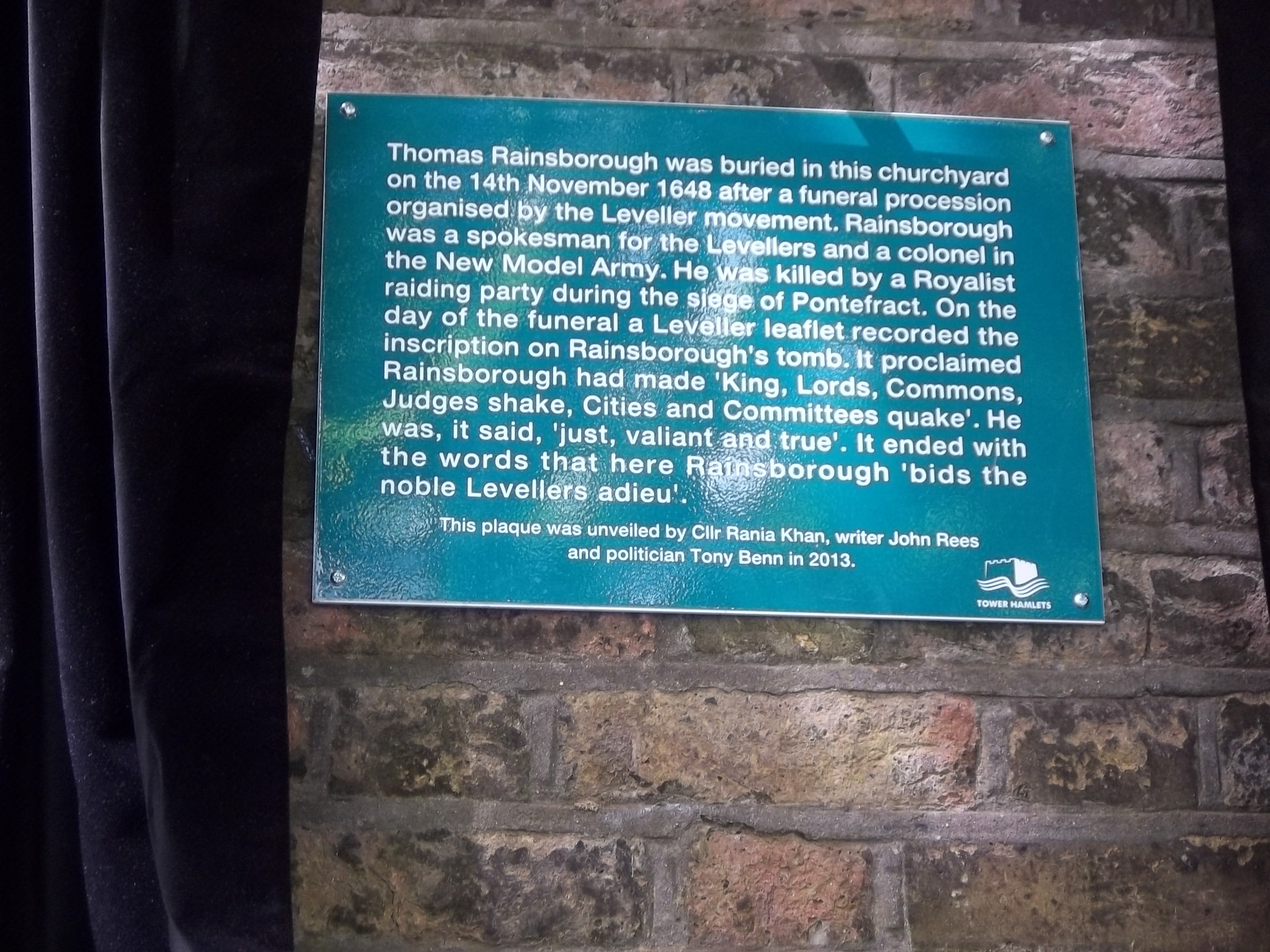
Plaque installed in Wapping 12 May 2013

After a funeral ceremony organised by his brother William and attended by around 3,000 Leveller sympathisers, Rainsborough was buried next to his father at St John's Church, Wapping. Parliament granted his widow Margaret his arrears of pay, amounting to over £1,300, along with an annual pension of £200 per year; a few years later, she also received lands in Somerset and Lancashire. His death was the subject of a 1648 ballad titled Colonell Rainsborowes ghost.

In May 2013, a plaque commemorating Rainsborough was unveiled by Cllr Rania Khan, historian and writer John Rees and former MP Tony Benn at St John's church.

== Fictional portrayal ==
Rainsborough is portrayed by Michael Fassbender in the Channel 4 drama The Devil's Whore.

He plays a minor but crucial role in the historical novel Traitor's Field, by Robert Wilton, published in 2013.

== Sources ==
- Andrews, Kenneth (1991). Ships, money, and politics: seafaring and naval enterprise in the reign of Charles I. CUP Archive.
- Bennet, Martyn (1980). "Henry Hastings and the Flying Army of Ashby de la Zouch" (PDF). Leicestershire Archaeological and Historical Society (19).
- Gentles, Ian (1992). The New Model Army in England, Ireland and Scotland, 1645-1653. Blackwell. ISBN 978-0631158691.
- Gentles, Ian (2004). "Rainborowe [Rainborow], Thomas (d. 1648)". Oxford Dictionary of National Biography (online ed.). Oxford University Press. doi:10.1093/ref:odnb/23020. (Subscription, Wikipedia Library access or UK public library membership required.)
- Hsiao, Andrew; Lim, Audrea (2020). The Verso Book of Dissent: Revolutionary Words from Three Millennia of Rebellion and Resistance. Verso Books. ISBN 978-1-78873-911-5.
- Pestana, Carla Gardina (2004). "Rainborowe [Rainsborough], William (fl. 1639–1673))". Oxford Dictionary of National Biography (online ed.). Oxford University Press. doi:10.1093/ref:odnb/66326. (Subscription, Wikipedia Library access or UK public library membership required.)
- Pestana, Carla Gardina (2008). "Winthrop, Stephen (1619–1658)". Oxford Dictionary of National Biography (online ed.). Oxford University Press. doi:10.1093/ref:odnb/66329. (Subscription, Wikipedia Library access or UK public library membership required.)
- Plant, David (2008). "Thomas Rainsborough, c.1610-48". BCW Project.
- Quintrell, Brian (2008). "Rainborow, William (bap. 1587, d. 1642)". Oxford Dictionary of National Biography (online ed.). Oxford University Press. doi:10.1093/ref:odnb/23021. (Subscription, Wikipedia Library access or UK public library membership required.)
- Rees, John (2016). The Leveller Revolution. Verso. ISBN 978-1-78478-390-7.
- Royle, Trevor (2004). Civil War: The Wars of the Three Kingdoms 1638–1660 (2006 ed.). Abacus. ISBN 978-0-349-11564-1.
- "Leveller Thomas Rainsborough plaque unveiling St John's Churchyard Wapping and speakers". YouTube. 14 February 2017. Archived from the original on 21 December 2021.
