= John Wildman =

English politician and soldier (died 1693)

Sir John Wildman MP
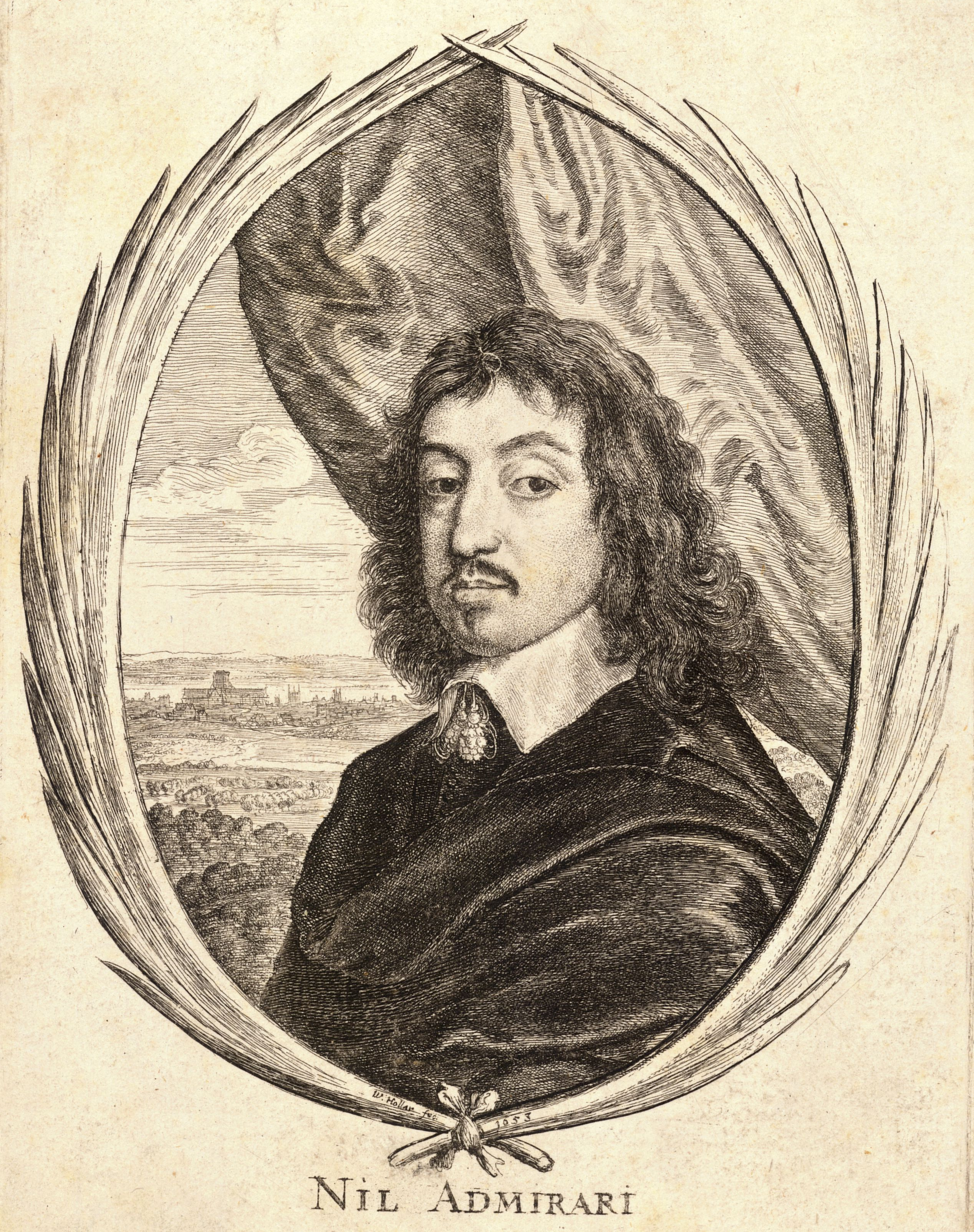
- 1653 engraving of John Wildman by Wenceslas Hollar. The caption reads nil admirari ("astonished at nothing")

Postmaster General
- In office 1689–1691
- Preceded by: Laurence Hyde, 1st Earl of Rochester
- Succeeded by: Sir Thomas Frankland; Robert Cotton

Member of Parliament
- In office 1689–1693 Serving with Henry St John
- Preceded by: John Pleydell
- Succeeded by: Henry Pinnell
- Constituency: Wootton Bassett

Member of Parliament
- In office 1654–1656
- Preceded by: (vacancy)
- Succeeded by: Colonel Edward Salmon
- Constituency: Scarborough

Sir John Wildman (c. 1621 – 2 June 1693) was an English politician, republican activist and soldier. A prominent Leveller during the English Civil War, he helped draft the Agreement of the People and later engaged in political intrigue under the Commonwealth, Protectorate, and after the Restoration of the Monarchy. Surviving multiple imprisonments, he served as a member of Parliament and as Postmaster General under William III.

== Biography ==
Wildman was born to Jeffrey and Margaret Wildman (née Poaker) in the Norfolk town of Wymondham. He was christened at Wymondham on 24 January 1621, the youngest of three children. John's mother died soon after he was born, as his father Jeffrey, who was a butcher, remarried (to Dorothie Leverich) on 2 January 1622. John may have been educated as a sizar (a poor scholar who had to work as a servant to pay his way) at Corpus Christi College, Cambridge. A John Wildman of Norfolk received a BA in 1641 and an MA from Cambridge in 1644. Wildman may have had legal training as he later described himself as an attorney or solicitor.

=== Civil War ===
In the English Civil War Wildman served briefly under Sir Thomas Fairfax. He became prominent, however, as a civilian adviser to the Army agitators, being in 1647 one of the leaders of that section of the army that opposed all compromise with King Charles I.

Wildman's first known entry into politics came in early July 1647, when he and other backers of the New Model Army journeyed from London to the army's headquarters in Reading to deliver a supportive address to the army's leaders. Later that month, he and other army allies (including William Walwyn and Maximilian Petty) were invited by the army to attend the Reading Debates and to comment on the Heads of Proposals, the army's new peace plan. The London delegation grew concerned that the Heads made too many concessions to the King and Lords, and on 24 July they drafted a manifesto to Lord General Sir Thomas Fairfax warning that fundamental principles of governance were in danger of being betrayed. This marked an important shift, in which discontented elements in the army and London began to turn against the army leadership and to agitate for more radical reform. Wildman would be one of the central ringleaders of this movement.

In December 1647 Wildman wrote a pamphlet, Putney Projects, that attacked Oliver Cromwell and Henry Ireton for betraying the New Model Army's Declaration of 14 June 1647 in the Heads of Proposals. He may have written parts of The Case of the Army Stated, and he put the views of his associates before the Council of the Army at the Putney Debates that were partly held in Putney parish church between 28 October and 11 November 1647. The soldiers, explained Wildman, "desired me to be their mouth", and he argued on their behalf that the engagements entered into with the King should be cancelled, monarchy and the House of Lords abolished, and manhood suffrage established. He also demanded that the officers should accept an Agreement of the People just put forth by the five regiments, a document that some modern historians consider he had the principal hand in drafting.

Wildman and John Lilburne attempted to build a movement to campaign for the Agreement of the People. The Earl of Clarendon alleged that preparations were made "for his trial and towards his execution". On 18 January 1648 George Masterson, minister of Shoreditch informed against Wildman and Lieutenant-Colonel John Lilburne for promoting a seditious petition. Wildman and Lilburne were summoned to the bar of the House of Commons, which committed both men to Newgate Prison. Bail was refused, and, in spite of frequent petitions for their release, they remained in prison until 2 August 1648. The historian C.H. Firth stated in the DNB (1900) that Wildman's speech at the bar of the house was very ineffective, and the pamphlet he published in answer to Masterson's charges, entitled Truth's Triumph, was derisively refuted by Masterson in the Triumph Stained.

On the release of the two prisoners the Levellers held a meeting at the Nag's Head tavern, in which, says Lilburne, "the just ends of the war were as exactly laid open by Mr. John Wildman as ever I heard in my life", and the party agreed to oppose the execution or deposition of the king until the fundamental principles of the future constitution were settled. To that end a new Agreement of the People was drawn up by sixteen representatives of different parties, but, after long debates in the Council of Officers, it was so altered by the officers that Lilburne and other leaders of the levellers refused to accept it, and published in May 1649 a rival Agreement, drawn up by themselves.

It seems that Wildman was satisfied with what the Council of Officers were suggesting because he abandoned further agitation, and in the winter of 1648–49 he joined the New Model Army as major in the regiment of horse of Colonel John Reynolds. However he did not accompany the regiment to Ireland in August 1649.

=== Commonwealth ===
Wildman remained in England and became one of the greatest speculators in the forfeited lands of royalists, clergy, and Roman Catholics. His purchases of land, either for himself or for others, were scattered over at least twenty counties. For himself he bought in 1655 the manor of Beckett near Shrivenham (then in Berkshire, now Oxfordshire), and other lands adjoining it, from his friend Henry Marten.

In 1654 Wildman was elected to the First Protectorate Parliament as MP for Scarborough, but he was probably one of those excluded for refusing the engagement not to attempt to alter the government. By the end of 1654 he was plotting the overthrow of the Protector Oliver Cromwell by means of a combined rising of Royalists and Levellers. Consequently, he was arrested on 10 February 1655 at the village of Easton, near Marlborough, Wiltshire, while dictating A Declaration of the free and well-affected People of England now in Arms against the Tyrant Oliver Cromwell, esq to his secretary William Parker. He was sent a prisoner first to Chepstow Castle, and afterwards to the Tower of London. Nearly a year and a half later, on 26 June 1656 a petition begging for Wildman's release was presented to the Protector by various persons engaged in business speculations with him, and on giving security for £10,000 he was provisionally set free.

For the rest of the Protectorate Wildman kept out of prison, though he still continued in intrigue. He was in frequent communication with Royalist agents, whom he contrived to persuade that he was working for the King's cause, and he signed the address presented to Charles II on behalf of the Levellers in July 1656. It is fairly certain that Cromwell's government was aware of these intrigues, and it is probable that Wildman purchased impunity by giving information of some kind to Cromwell's spy master John Thurloe. For this reason Edward Hyde and the more prudent Royalists did not trust him. C.H. Firth speculated that Wildman's political object in this complicated web of treachery was probably to overthrow Cromwell, and to set up in his place either a republic or a monarchy limited by some elaborate constitution of his own devising.

In the late 1650s Wildman used his new wealth to acquire a victualing house in Bow Street, Covent Garden, at the sign of the Nonsuch, which he entrusted to his servant William Parker. At the Nonsuch, Wildman and Parker allegedly hosted a regular gathering of the Commonwealth Club, a Republican club, which supposedly attracted diehard commonwealthsmen such as Henry Marten and Arthur Haselrig as well as the political theorist James Harrington. Wildman was also in 1659 a member of James Harrington's Rota Club, a Republican debating club which determined its decisions by ballot.

In December 1659, when the Army had turned out the Long Parliament, Wildman was employed by the Council of Officers, in conjunction with Bulstrode Whitelocke, Charles Fleetwood, and others, to draw a form of government for a free state. At the same time he was plotting to overthrow the rule of the Army, and offered to raise three thousand horse if Whitelocke, who was constable of Windsor Castle, would declare for a free commonwealth. Whitelocke declined, and Wildman, seeing which way the tide was running, helped Colonel Henry Ingoldsby to seize the castle for the Long Parliament. On 28 December 1659 the House promised that the good service of those who had assisted Ingoldsby should be duly rewarded,

=== Restoration ===
At the Restoration of the English Monarchy information against Wildman was presented to Parliament, but thanks to these recent exploits and to his hostility to Cromwell, he escaped untroubled. In 1661 complaints were made that the officials of the General Post Office were his creatures, and he was accused of suspicious dealings with the letters. He was also suspected of complicity in the republican plots against the government, and on 26 November 1661 he was examined and committed to close imprisonment. For nearly six years he was a prisoner, first in the Tower, then in St Mary's, Isles of Scilly, and finally in Pendennis Castle. His captivity was shared by his son, and, according to Gilbert Burnet, he spent his time in studying law and physic.

After the fall of Clarendon, on 1 October 1667, Wildman was released on giving security to attempt nothing against the government. In December it was even rumoured that he was to be a member of the committee of accounts about to be appointed by Parliament, through the influence of the George, Duke of Buckingham. Sir William Coventry expressed his wonder at the proposal to Samuel Pepys, Wildman having been "a false fellow to everybody", and Sir John Talbot openly denounced Wildman in the House of Commons. The scheme fell through, and on 7 July 1670 Wildman obtained a license for himself, his wife and son to travel abroad for his health. His intimacy with Buckingham continued, and he was one of the trustees in whom on 24 December 1675 the unsold portion of Buckingham's estate was vested.

On his return to England, Wildman plunged once more into political intrigues, though keeping himself at first cautiously in the background. In the plots for armed resistance to the King which followed the dissolution of Charles II's last parliament in 1681 he appears to have played a considerable part. Wildman was closely associated with Algernon Sidney, both of whom were distrusted by the leaders of the Scottish malcontents, and by the English noblemen concerned, as too republican in their aims. Wildman drew up a manifesto to be published at the time of the intended insurrection, and, though not one of the "public managers", was privately consulted upon all occasions and applied unto as their "chief oracle"; He was also credited with suggesting the assassination of the King and the Duke of York, "whom he expressed by the name of stags that would not be impaled, but leapt over all the fences which the care and wisdom of the authors of the constitution had made to restrain them from committing spoils". On 26 June 1683 he was committed to the Tower of London for complicity in the Rye House Plot, but allowed out on bail on 24 November following, and finally discharged on 12 February 1684. The chief witness against him was Lord Howard, who testified that Wildman undertook to furnish the rebels with some guns, which the discovery of two small field-pieces at his house seemed to confirm.

When the reign of James II of England began, Wildman, undeterred by his narrow escape, entered into communication with the Duke of Monmouth, and was his chief agent in England. He sent a certain Robert Cragg, alias Smith, to Monmouth and the English exiles in Holland. According to Cragg, Monmouth complained of Wildman's backwardness in providing money for the expedition, and that Wildman would hinder the expedition from coming until Wildman judged the time right. Wildman, on the other hand, complained that Monmouth and a small group of exiles were resolved "to conclude the scheme of the government of the nation without the knowledge of any of the people in England", Other depositions represent him as advising Monmouth to take upon him the title of King, and encouraging him by citing the example of the 2nd Earl of Richmond (who became Henry VII) and Richard III. All accounts agree that he drew back at the last moment, did nothing to get up the promised rising in London, and refused to join Monmouth when he landed. At the beginning of June 1685 Wildman fled, and an order for his arrest was published in the London Gazette for 4–8 June 1685, followed on 26 July by a proclamation summoning him and others to surrender.

=== Glorious Revolution ===
Wildman, who had escaped to the Netherlands, remained there until the Glorious Revolution, probably living in Amsterdam. He was dissatisfied with the declaration published by the William, Prince of Orange to justify his expedition, regarding it as designed to conciliate the church party in England, and desiring to make it a comprehensive impeachment of the misgovernment of Charles and James. The Charles, Earl of Macclesfield, Lord Mordaunt, and others supported Wildman's view, but more moderate counsellors prevailed. With Lord Macclesfield, Wildman embarked on the Prince's fleet and landed in England. He wrote many anonymous pamphlets on the crisis, sat in the Convention Parliament called in January 1689 as member for Wootton Bassett and was a frequent speaker.

In the proceedings against Burton and Graham, charged with subornation of evidence in the state trials of the late reign, Wildman was particularly active, bringing in the report of the committee appointed to investigate the case, and representing the Commons at a conference with the House of Lords on the subject.

On 12 April 1689 he was made Postmaster General. But before long strong complaints were made that he was using his position to discredit the Tory adherents of William III by fictitious letters which he pretended to have intercepted; and there were also reports that he was intriguing with Jacobite emissaries. Accordingly, he was summarily dismissed from his post about the end of February 1691. Wildman, however, had been made a freeman of the City of London on 7 December 1689, became an alderman, and was knighted by William III in company with other aldermen at the Guildhall, London on 29 October 1692.

Wildman died on 2 June 1693, aged 72, and is buried at Shrivenham.

== Posterity ==
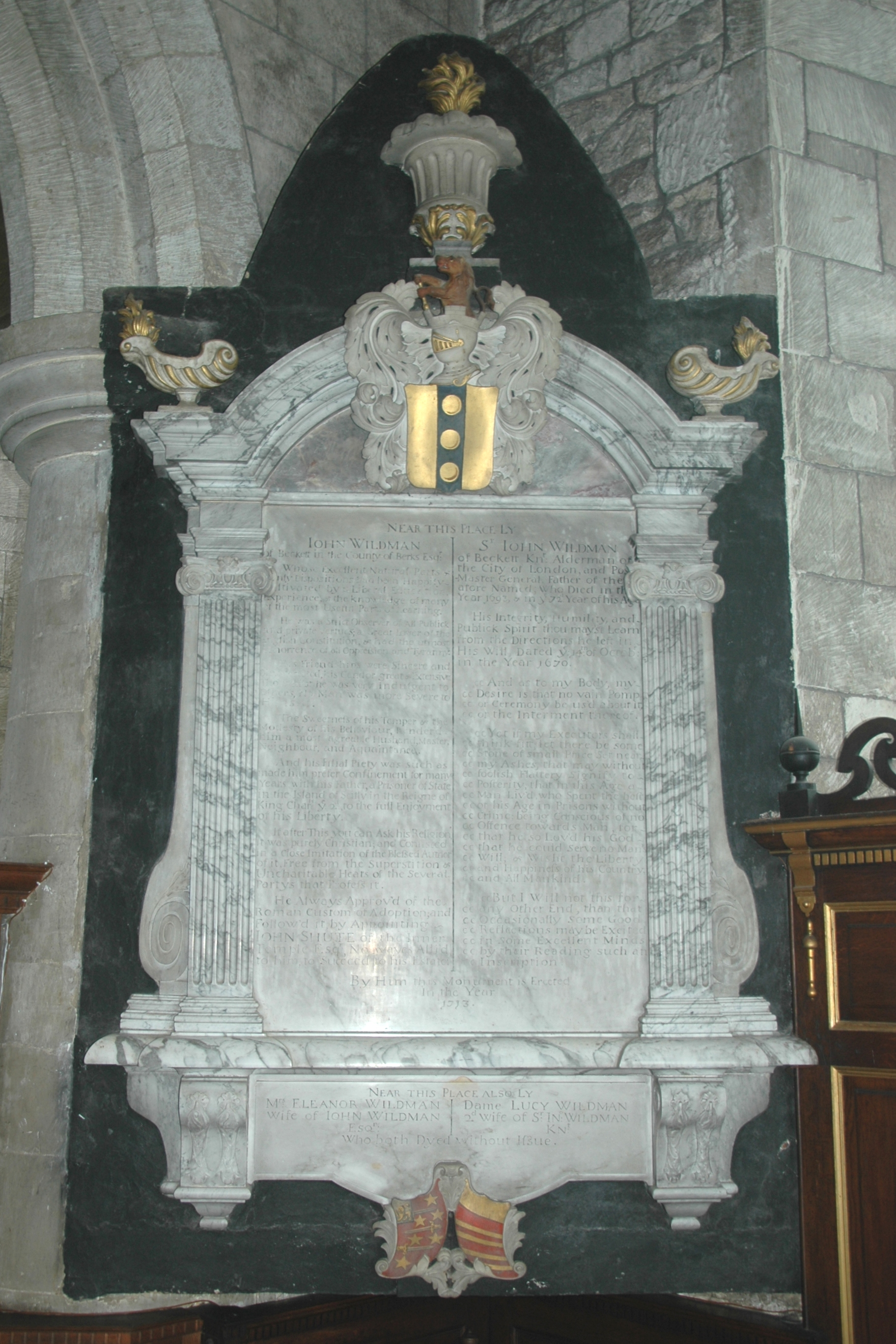
Marble monument to John Wildman in St Andrew's parish church, Shrivenham

By his will, according to the epitaph on his monument in St. Andrew's parish church, Wildman directed:

"that if his executors should think fit there should be some stone of small price set near to his ashes, to signify, without foolish flattery, to his posterity, that in that age there lived a man who spent the best part of his days in prisons, without crimes, being conscious of no offence towards man, for that he so loved his God that he could serve no man's will, and wished the liberty and happiness of his country and all mankind".

Baron Macaulay was less favourable. After describing a fanatical hatred to monarchy as the mainspring of Wildman's career, he adds:

"With Wildman's fanaticism was joined a tender care for his own safety. He had a wonderful skill in grazing the edge of treason. ... Such was his cunning, that though always plotting, though always known to be plotting, and though long malignantly watched by a vindictive government, he eluded every danger, and died in his bed, after having seen two generations of his accomplices die on the gallows".

There is an engraved portrait of Wildman by William Faithorne, with the motto "Nil Admirari".

== Works ==
Wildman was the author of numerous pamphlets, nearly all of them either anonymous or published under pseudonyms:

- Putney Projects; or the Old Serpent in a New Form. By John Lawmind, 1647.
- The Case of the Army stated, 1647 (Clarke Papers, i. 347, 356).
- A Call to all the Soldiers of the Army by the Free People of England, justifying the Proceedings of the Five Regiments, 1647 (anon.)
- Truth's Triumph, 1648 (answered by George Masterson in The Triumph Stained, 1648).
- The Law's Subversion; or Sir John Maynard's Case truly stated. By J. Howldin, 1648 (cf. Lilburne, The Picture of the Council of State, 1649, pp. 8, 19).
- London's Liberties; or a Learned Argument between Mr. Maynard and Major Wildman, 1651.

In the Twelve Collections of Papers relating to the Present Juncture of Affairs in England (1688–9, 4to), there are several pamphlets probably written by Wildman, viz.:

- v. 8, Ten Seasonable Queries proposed by an English Gentleman at Amsterdam to his Friends in England
- vi. 3, A Letter to a Friend advising in this Extraordinary Juncture how to free the Nation from Slavery for ever
- viii. 5, Good Advice before it be too late, being a Breviate for the Convention

Three tracts are attributed to Wildman, jointly with others, in A Collection of State Tracts, published on occasion of the late Revolution and during the Reign of William III (1705, 3 vols. fol.), viz.:

- A Memorial from the English Protestants to the Prince and Princess of Orange (i. 1)
- A Defence of the Proceedings of the Late Parliament in England, anno 1689 (i. 209)
- An Enquiry or Discourse between a Yeoman of Kent and a Knight of the Shire, upon the Prorogation of Parliament, &c. (ii. 330).

== Family ==
Published accounts have recorded that Wildman's first wife was Frances, daughter of Sir Francis Englefield, 2nd Baronet, and his second wife was Lucy, daughter of Lord Lovelace. However, these connections have recently been contested. The History of Parliament - The House of Commons 1640-1660 records that Wildman's first wife was Dorothy, daughter of Michael Whitefoot of Hapton in Norfolk, a family noticed in Wildman's own will. Wildman's second wife was Lucy Richmond, daughter of Anthony Richmond of Idstone, Ashbury, Berkshire, from a family connected to Wildman's friend and ally, the Berkshire MP Henry Marten.

Wildman had a son, John, who married Eleanor, daughter of Edward Chute of Bethersden, Kent, in 1676, and died childless in 1710, though he made John Shute, later Viscount Barrington, his chief heir, particularly of Beckett Hall, which the elder Wildman had bought in 1657 from the regicide Henry Marten (see above). (Note: The Oxford Dictionary of National Biography (2004) (ODNB) states that Wildman's first wife was Frances, daughter of Sir Francis Englefield, while the second was Lucy "daughter of Lord Lovelace". The ODNB account fails to identify its sources for the identity of either wife, so checking the secondary or primary sources used by the author of the ODNB article is difficult. The details of the first marriage as described by the ODNB match those of Ashley's work, and the ODNB may have used Ashley as a source, but Ashley does not cite another source (Ashley 17). The identity of Wildman's first wife therefore remains unclear pending the discovery of more reliable sources. However, it is noteworthy that, in 1689, Wildman sat as MP for Wootton Bassett in Wiltshire where the Englefields lived (Nash Ford 2010). The ODNB's identification Lucy "daughter of Lord Lovelace" appears also to be based on Ashley, but his referenced source (Ashley 18, 304), the '13th Report of the Royal Commission on Historical Manuscripts', does not mention this marriage. Richmond, however, cites several items of direct primary source evidence that Lucy was the daughter of Anthony Richmond of Idstone at Ashbury in Berkshire (now Oxfordshire) (see Richmond, v. 3, p. 134-5), and Nash Ford states this is confirmed by the arms of Wildman impaling Richmond on the ledger stone above their grave in Shrivenham Church.(Nash Ford 2010; Ball & Ball, 2002) It seems that "Lord Lovelace" (presumably Richard Lovelace, 1st Baron Lovelace (1564–1634)) may not have a daughter named Lucy. There is certainly none recorded in the Hurley parish register with the rest of his children (Nash Ford 2010c). He did, however, have a daughter, Elizabeth, who married Henry Marten (Nash Ford 2010a) and Ford suggests the two have been confused (Nash Ford 2010).)

== Notes ==
Footnotes

Citations
