= Mary Overton =

Political activist and writer

Mary Overton (c. 1615 – unknown) was a political activist, writer and prominent figure in the Leveller movement during the English Civil War. The wife of Richard Overton, she is known for writing The Humble Appeale and Petition of Mary Overton. Historians regard her as one of the first prominent female political campaigners.

== Biography ==
Mary Johnson, eldest child of John and Maria (née Harpam) Tickell, was christened 3 September 1615, in Withern, Lincolnshire. On 23 April 1635, she married Richard Overton, also of Lincolnshire. After settling in London, Mary and her husband Richard, established an unlicensed, underground press in Bell Alley by 1640 to publish radical religious and political literature. Operating under the pseudonym "Margerie Mar-Prelate," the Overtons printed anonymous satires lampooning the Anglican episcopacy and King Charles I. Following the publication of signed pamphlets in 1643, the couple became permanent targets of state surveillance and persecution from both Royalist and Cromwellian authorities.

Mary entered the public sphere of print culture as a consequence of the Leveller persecutions of 1646. She appeared briefly in the Journal of the House of Lords when she was arrested with her brother, Thomas Johnson, in November 1646 at the house she shared with Richard, who was already imprisoned in Newgate. Mary Overton was taken to Maiden Lane Prison, with her six-month old baby. She remained silent when she was called before the Lords to answer charges, and presumably, refused to recognise the upper house’s jurisdiction over a commoner, before being sent to Bridewell Prison. She later complained that she was dragged there "headlong upon the stones through all the dirt and mire of the streets" with her six-months-old baby in her arms. She was also pregnant with another child, and in prison she had a miscarriage.

Whilst in custody, a petition was smuggled out to London on 24 March 1647, entitled: To the right Honourable, Knights, Citizens and Burgesses, the Parliament of England assembled in Westminster, the humble Appeale and Petition of Mary Overton, prisoner in Bridewell, one of the earliest female political publications. Most historians have accepted Richard Overton’s claim to have written Mary’s petition. Mary was released in July 1647, and Richard two months later. Like Elizabeth Lilburne, Mary Overton acted as a spokesperson for her husband whilst he was in prison, and some historians have argued that they were "the feminist implication" of the Leveller movement.

In March 1649, the Rump Parliament arrested Richard Overton, William Walwyn, Thomas Prince, and John Lilburne. The supporters of the Leveller movement called for the release of the four Levellers who were imprisoned, which led to included England's first ever all-female petition, that was supported by over 10,000 signatures. This group was led by Mary Overton, Elizabeth Lilburne, and Katherine Chidley, and they presented the petition to the House of Commons on 25th April 1649. Through the 1640s, Mary was the subject of political attacks from parliamentary sympathizers who often deployed sexual satire to undermine the legitimacy of radicals.

Little is known about the fate of Mary Overton after 1649. Richard Overton and the other Leveller leaders were released from the Tower on 8th November 1649, following Lilburne's acquittal on charges of treason. Overton grew disillusioned with Oliver Cromwell and in 1655 fled to Flanders after conspiring a plot to overthrow the government. Richard Overton returned to England but was once more in prison in 1663 for publishing a pamphlet attacking Charles II. He died in 1664, but it is not known when Mary Overton died.
