= Instrument of Government =

1653 constitution of England, Scotland and Ireland

Overview
- Original title: The government of the Commonwealth of England, Scotland, and Ireland, and the dominions thereunto belonging
- Jurisdiction: Commonwealth of England, Scotland and Ireland: England; Scotland; Ireland; Other dominions
- Presented: 15 December 1653; 372 years ago
- Date effective: 16 December 1653; 372 years ago (Installation of the Lord Protector)
- Chambers: Unicameral (House of Commons)
- Executive: Lord Protector, Council of State
- First legislature: 3 September 1654; 371 years ago
- Repealed: 25 May 1657; 369 years ago (superseded by Humble Petition and Advice)
- Author: John Lambert
- Supersedes: Barebone's Parliament

Full text
- Instrument of Government, 1653 at Wikisource

Coat of Arms of the Commonwealth of England, Scotland and Ireland, used 1654–1655.

The Instrument of Government was the first constitution of the Commonwealth of England, Scotland and Ireland and was also the first codified and written constitution in England. It was drafted by Major-General John Lambert in 1653.

The work incorporates elements from the document Heads of Proposals (1647), which contained the constitutional proposals offered by Army Council to Charles I of England. Under the new constitution, the executive power was held by the Lord Protector. Each Lord Protector was intended to hold the office for life, with no term limits. The legislative power was held exclusively by the then-unicameral Parliament of England, and each session of Parliament had to last for at least five months. An English Council of State would replace the Privy Council, and the actions taken by the Lord Protector would require the consent of a majority of the council to be legal. A number of limits were placed on the authority of the Lord Protector to prevent him from acting as an absolute ruler. The constitution authorised the maintenance of a standing army, which would include 10,000 soldiers as its cavalry, and 20,000 soldiers as its infantry. The document authorised the maintenance of a separate navy, but did not define the intended size of its forces.

The Instrument of Government was adopted by the Council of Officers on 15 December 1653 and Oliver Cromwell was installed as the first Lord Protector on the following day. In January 1655, Cromwell dissolved the Parliament and started ruling without constitutional limits, in a period of military dictatorship by the Major Generals. The Instrument of Government was replaced in May 1657 by England's second codified constitution, the Humble Petition and Advice.

== Antecedence ==
The Instrument of Government included elements incorporated from an earlier document, "Heads of Proposals", a set of propositions that had been agreed to by the Army Council in 1647, intended to be a basis for a constitutional settlement after King Charles I was defeated in the First English Civil War. Charles had rejected the propositions, but before the start of the Second Civil War the "Grandees" (senior officers opposing the Leveller faction) of the New Model Army had presented the Heads of Proposals as their alternative to the more radical Agreement of the People presented by the Agitators and their civilian supporters at the Putney Debates.

On 4 January 1649, the Rump Parliament declared "that the people are, under God, the original of all just power; that the Commons of England, being chosen by and representing the people, have the supreme power in this nation". This was used as the basis for the House of Commons to pass acts of parliament which did not have to be passed by the House of Lords or receive royal assent. Two days later the Rump alone passed the act creating the high court of justice that would try Charles as a traitor. Charles was tried and executed later that month.

On 17 March, the Rump passed an act abolishing the monarchy and two days later an act abolishing the House of Lords. On 19 May 1649 the Rump passed An Act declaring England to be a Commonwealth. It was a simple declaration that Parliament would appoint "Officers and Ministers under them for the good of the People... without any King or House of Lords".

== Provisions ==
The Instrument of Government split the government of England across three elements.

- Executive power was held by the Lord Protector. Although this post was elective, not hereditary, appointment was to be held for life.
- Legislation was raised in Parliament. These had to be called triennially, with each sitting for at least five months.
- An English Council of State of around twenty members to provide advice in the same manner as former Privy Councils, though with strengthened powers, so that many of the actions taken by the Lord Protector require the consent of a majority of the council; examples include the use of military when parliament is not sitting (IV) and declaring war and peace (V). The council also nominates ministers (XXXIV) and elects the Lord Protector upon the death of the previous one (XXXII).

Thus the Lord Protector was far from an absolute ruler, with his powers limited in many areas. All three branches of government had checks upon each other, with the Lord Protector having the authority to veto a bill from Parliament, but a second majority vote after twenty days would pass the bill (XXIV).

The instrument declared, "That the supreme legislative authority of the Commonwealth of England, Scotland, and Ireland, and the dominions thereunto belonging, shall be and reside in one person, and the people assembled in Parliament: the style of which person shall be the Lord Protector of the Commonwealth of England, Scotland, and Ireland".

Provision for a standing army was made "of 10,000 horse and dragoons, and 20,000 foot, in England, Scotland and Ireland, for the defence and security thereof" and "a convenient number of ships for guarding of the seas" (XXVII).

The instrument defined the numbers of MPs to be elected to parliament but at the same time disbarred Royalists from election and temporarily from voting (XIV) and Catholics from election or voting (XV).

Electors needed to hold property holding of at least £200.

== Adoption and replacement ==
The Instrument of Government was adopted by the Council of Officers on 15 December 1653 and Oliver Cromwell was installed as Lord Protector on the following day. In January 1655, Cromwell dissolved the first Protectorate Parliament, ushering in a period of military rule by the Major Generals.

The Instrument of Government was replaced in May 1657 by England's second, and last, codified constitution, the Humble Petition and Advice.

== Influence on the American constitution ==
Since North America had already been colonised by the English—in 1607, at Jamestown, and in 1620, at Plymouth—the United States has sometimes claimed this historic document as a part of its political, legal, and historic heritage.

== See also ==
- Provisions of Oxford (1258)
- The Heads of Proposals and the Putney Debates (1647)
