= Corkbush Field mutiny =

The Corkbush Field Mutiny (or Ware Mutiny) occurred on 15 November 1647 during the early stages of the Second English Civil War at the Corkbush Field rendezvous when soldiers were ordered to sign a declaration of loyalty to Thomas Fairfax, the commander-in-chief of the New Model Army (NMA), and the Army Council. When some refused, they were arrested, and one of the ringleaders, Private Richard Arnold, was executed.

== Background ==
After the Putney Debates, the Army commanders Thomas Fairfax and Oliver Cromwell were concerned about the strength of support that the Levellers had in the NMA. They imposed the Heads of Proposals as the army's manifesto, instead of the Levellers' Agreement of the People. They demanded that every soldier sign a declaration of loyalty, both to Fairfax as commander-in-chief, and to the Army Council, which signified that they accepted the Heads of the Proposals as the Army's manifesto. Many of the men were willing to sign, even if they had Leveller sympathies, because Cromwell and Fairfax promised that Parliament would honour the back payments they were owed. It was suggested that if they did not sign then the army could not present a united front to Parliament and payment could be delayed and that some regiments might be disbanded with no back pay at all.

== Incidents ==
The Army Council had agreed at the Putney Debates that Corkbush Field near Ware in the county of Hertfordshire was to be the first of three rendezvous. When Fairfax arrived, most of the soldiers in the seven regiments ordered to be there agreed to sign. The radical Member of Parliament and Leveller agitator, Colonel Thomas Rainsborough tried to present Fairfax with a copy of the Agreement of the People but was ignored. Several officers including Major Scott who refused to sign and encouraged their men not to sign were placed under arrest. Two regiments turned up without orders to do so. They carried copies of the Agreement of the people and stuck pieces of paper in their hatbands with the legend England's Freedom, Soldiers' Rights which was a Levellers' slogan. Colonel Thomas Harrison's regiment of horse arrived first. Fairfax succeeded in talking the mutinous regiment around and they agreed to sign. Colonel Robert Lilburne's regiment of foot arrived a little later. (Robert was the brother of John Lilburne, a famous agitator). They stoned and wounded one of Fairfax's officers when he approached them. With sword drawn, Cromwell and some of his officers rode into their ranks and ordered them to take the papers from their hats. Cromwell had eight or nine of the more truculent of Lilburne's troopers arrested. They were tried at an improvised court-martial and found guilty of mutiny. Three ringleaders were sentenced to death and, having cast lots, Private Richard Arnold was shot on the spot as an example. At the other two rendezvous, at Ruislip Heath and Kingston, the other regiments were ordered to show support for Fairfax which they all agreed to do. Thus, the army remained under control and intact, so it was able to take the field when in July 1648 the Second English Civil War started.

== Aftermath ==
The issues raised did not go away. Over the next year, civilian "agitators" (as the Levellers called themselves) were active promoting the ideas in the Agreement of the People. As the impossibility of reaching agreement with Charles I became clear, many of the officers in the army who had not been in favour of the Levellers' suggestion that the King be removed, supported the regicide of Charles on 30 January 1649 and had to reconsider their political positions. This allowed the Levellers to regain support in the army.

The next Leveller mutiny in the New Model Army was the Bishopsgate mutiny in April 1649.

== See also ==
- English Civil War
- Banbury mutiny
