= John Reynolds (Roundhead) =

John Reynolds (1625–1657) was a soldier in the English Civil War and during the Commonwealth. Reynolds may have been a member of the Middle Temple. He joined the parliamentary army, and in 1648 he commanded a regiment of horse. He took part in the Cromwellian conquest of Ireland. He was a member of the Westminster-based Protectorate Parliament for Galway and Mayo in 1654 and Waterford and Tipperary in 1656. He was knighted in 1655. In 1657 he commanded the English force which cooperated with the French in Flanders in the Anglo-Spanish War and was lost at sea when returning to England.

== Biography ==
John Reynolds, the third son of Sir James Reynolds of Castle Camps, Cambridgeshire, was brother of Sir Robert Reynolds (c. 1601–1678). He was educated as a lawyer, and probably was a member of the Middle Temple.

Reynolds joined the parliamentary army, and was probably the Captain Reynolds whose gallantry is praised by Earl of Essex in his narrative of the surrender of the parliamentary army at Foy in September 1644. On the formation of the New Model Army he obtained command of a troop in Vermuyden's (afterwards Cromwell's) regiment of horse, and distinguished himself at the storming of Bridgewater. He is said to have taken a leading part in concerting opposition to the proposed disbanding of the army in 1647, and to have been for a time chairman of the committee of "agitators". Reynolds was popular with soldiers of advanced political views, and in 1648 was put in command of a regiment of horse consisting mainly of volunteer troops raised on the occasion of the Second Civil War, He was one of the officers in charge of King Charles I at Hurst Castle in December 1648. On 17 February 1649 his regiment was placed on the establishment, and ordered to be completed. It was intended to employ it in the relief of Ireland. Part of the regiment joined in the mutiny of the Levellers in May 1649, but Reynolds, with those who remained faithful, dispersed some of the mutineers at Banbury, held Newbridge against them, and joined in the final suppression of the revolt at Burford. The levellers denounced him in their pamphlets as an apostate and a traitor.

Reynolds and his regiment landed at Dublin on 25 July 1649, and played an important part in the victory which Colonel Michael Jones gained over the Marquis of Ormonde at the Battle of Rathmines on 2 August. He captured Carrick-on-Suir (November 1650), and with a very small garrison repulsed Lord Inchiquin's attempt to retake it. "Both in the taking and defending of this place", wrote Cromwell to the speaker, "Colonel Reynolds his carriage was such as deserves much honour". About April 1651 Reynolds was made commissary-general of the horse in Ireland, and in that capacity assisted in the sieges of Limerick and Galway, and signed capitulations with Colonel Fitzpatrick, Lord Clanricarde, and other Irish leaders. In 1653 the Aran Islands (15 January) and Inishbofin (14 February) surrendered to him.

For his services to the parliamentary cause, Parliament voted a reward of Irish lands to the value of £500 per annum to Reynolds, in pursuance of which vote the manor of Carrick was made over to him. With the debentures he received for his pay he invested in seven thousand acres of land in the county of Cork, and also purchased other lands in Waterford. In the First Protectorate Parliament of 1654 he represented the counties of Galway and Mayo, and in that of 1656 Waterford and Tipperary.

Reynolds was a zealous supporter of Cromwell, was knighted by the Protector on 11 June 1655, and voted for the offer of the crown to Oliver. In March 1655 Reynolds was employed in the suppression of the intended rising of the royalists in Shropshire.

In July 1656 Reynolds returned to Ireland with Henry Cromwell—Oliver's son and a brother-in-law of Reynolds through their marriage to the Russell sisters (see below). In September 1655 the Protector thought of sending Reynolds to command in Jamaica. Henry Cromwell reported that he was willing to accept the post, but added: "If you take him from hence you deprive me of my right hand". In November 1655 Reynolds promoted the petition for the appointment of Henry Cromwell as Lord Deputy of Ireland, or for the return of Fleetwood to his duties in Ireland. In January 1656 Reynolds was sent to England by Henry Cromwell to give the Protector an account of the state of affairs in Ireland. He was also charged with commissions of importance relative to the reorganisation of the Irish government.

On 25 April 1657 the Lord Protector appointed Reynolds commander-in-chief of the forces intended to co-operate with the French army in Flanders. His pay as commander-in-chief was five pounds per diem. Reynolds, after some hesitation, accepted. He landed in France in May, and was received with studied courtesy by Cardinal Mazarin, but he found it difficult to persuade Marshal Turenne to attack the coast towns of Flanders, and complained that English interests were throughout postponed to French. At the siege of Saint-Venant the English troops "behaved themselves very stoutly, and were one great cause of the governor's not daring to abide the utmost", but the six thousand men under the command of Reynolds were reduced to four thousand by September 1657, solely by the hardships of the campaign. "Howsoever", he protested, "if I must still fight on untill my dagger, which was a sword, become an oyster-knife, I am content and submit". Mardyck was taken on 23 September, and Reynolds installed there as governor of the English garrison; but the task of keeping so weakly fortified a post was one of great difficulty. Though Reynolds repulsed one attack with considerable loss to the assailants (22 October), both the English troops serving with Turenne and the garrison of Mardyke were so reduced by disease that at the beginning of December only eighteen hundred out of the six thousand were fit for service. Partly in order to obtain a fresh supply of men, partly on private grounds, Reynolds obtained leave to embark for England, leaving Major-general (afterwards Sir Thomas) Morgan to command at Mardyke in his absence. The ship in which he sailed was wrecked on the Goodwin Sands, and all on board were drowned, on 5 December 1657. On 7 December, Admiral Richard Stayner reported that the Half Moon had arrived from Mardyke but the accompanying pink containing Reynolds and Francis White had been lost and a trunk washed up containing White's personal letters. They were lost about the Goodwin Sands. John Thurloe wrote that the "loss is to be much lamented, they being very worthy persons and of great use".

A story which was widely circulated at the time represents Reynolds as returning to England in order to justify himself against the suspicions excited in the Protector's mind by a secret interview which had taken place between Reynolds and the Duke of York. The Memoirs of James II prove that such a meeting actually took place, but nothing more than ordinary civilities passed in it. Rumours that he had for some reason lost Cromwell's favour had certainly reached Reynolds, as a letter from Sir Francis Russell to his son-in-law proves.

== Family ==
Reynolds married Sarah, daughter of Sir Francis Russell of Chippenham, thus becoming the brother-in-law of Henry Cromwell, who had married her sister Elizabeth.

By his will, which was disputed, Reynolds left the manor of Carrick to his brother Robert, and his other lands in England and Ireland to James Calthorpe, the husband of his sister Dorothy. On 20 July 1659 the House of Commons declared the will valid, and ordered Robert Reynolds to be given possession of Carrick. Sarah, the widow of Sir John Reynolds, married, in 1660, Henry O'Brien, 7th Earl of Thomond.
