= Thomas Prince (Leveller) =

English Leveller

Thomas Prince (fl. 1630–1657) was a prominent Leveller.

== Biography ==
Prince was born in West Garforth, Yorkshire. He went to London where he apprenticed in, and in due time joined, the Worshipful Company of Clothworkers. Although a member of the Clothworkers he was a cheesemonger by trade. He settled in the parish of St Martin Orgar where, although an Independent, he stayed within the Anglican church.

Prince supported the Parliamentary cause in the English Civil War and served in the Blue regiment of London's trained bands until invalided out after being badly wounded in 1643 at the First Battle of Newbury. During the war he supplied he Parliamentary armies with cheese and butter and became moderately wealthy.

In November 1647 he was one of the men who presented the Agreement of the People to Parliament and was one of those imprisoned for this act. By December he was free and campaigning for the Levellers cause. In 1648 he continued to agitate and became recognised by both supported and detractors as a prominent Leveller. He was appointed as one of the Levellers' treasurers and in December was a signature to the petition presented to Sir Thomas Fairfax, the Army commander, objecting to the Army's dismissal of the second Agreement of the People.

In March 1649 he was arrested with the other Leveller leaders: John Lilburne, Richard Overton, and William Walwyn, and incarcerated in the Tower of London when the Levellers published a tract against the military government (the second part of) Englands New Chaines Discovered. While in the Tower the prisoners continued to publish pamphlets. Two of these can be directly linked to Prince: The Picture of the Councel of State, contains Prince's account of his arrest and examination by members of the Council of State, and The Silken Independents Snare Broken, a reply by Prince to an attack upon the Levellers by some leading London Independents.

Prince was released along with the other leading Leveller prisoners after Lilburne was found not guilty of high treason at his trial in October 1649. Prince continued to live in London until at least 1657 and was mentioned by Lilburne as one who would provide security for him if he were allowed to return from exile. Prince also spoke up for Lilburne at his 1653 trial.

== Family ==
Prince married Elizabeth; they had two children who were baptised in the parish of St Martin Orgar. One died as an infant.
