= Putney Debates =

1647 debates about British government

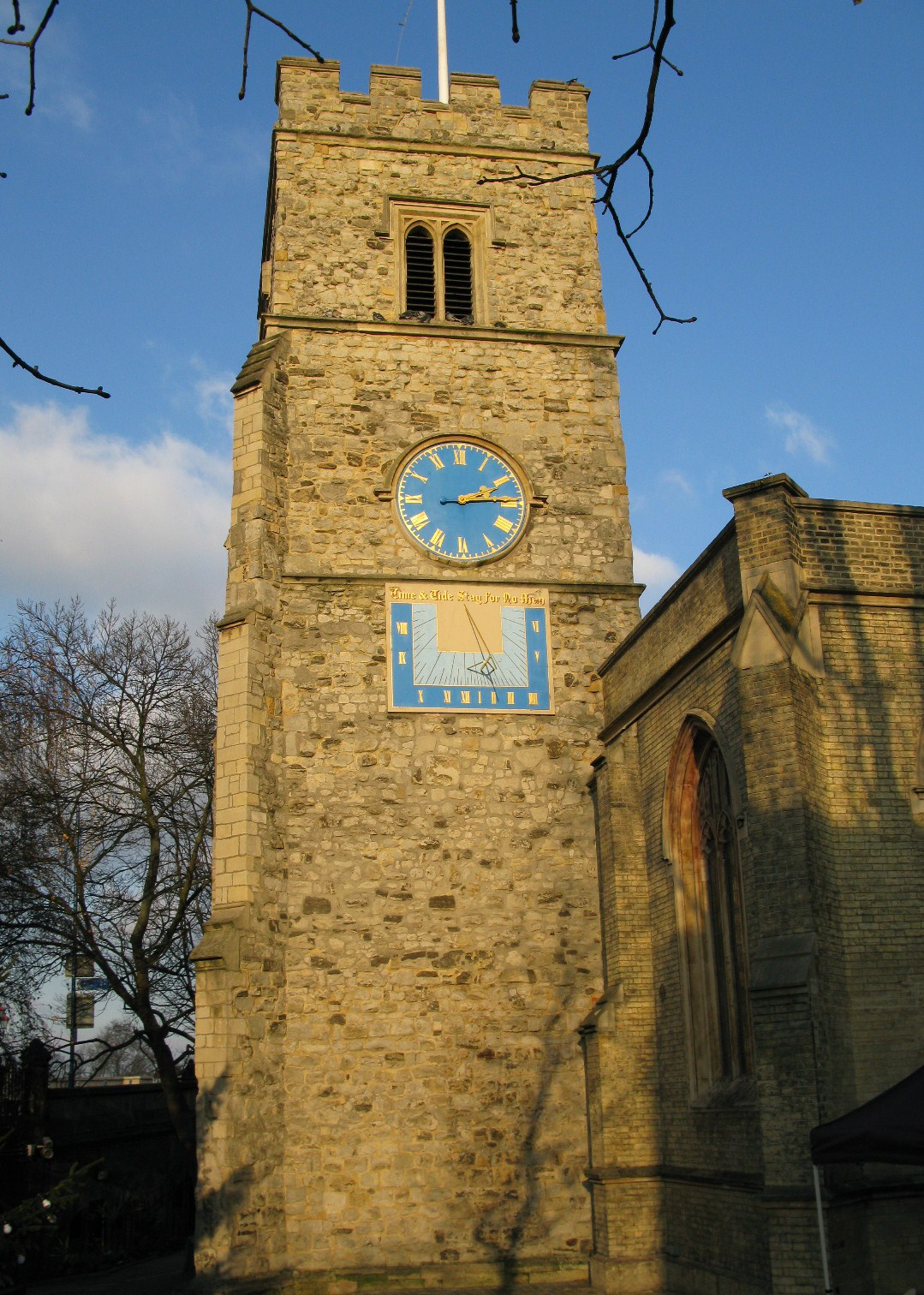
St. Mary's Church, Putney, location of the Putney Debates

The Putney Debates, which took place from 28 October to 8 November 1647, were a series of discussions over the political settlement that should follow Parliament's victory over Charles I in the First English Civil War. The main participants were senior officers of the New Model Army who favoured retaining Charles within the framework of a constitutional monarchy, and radicals such as the Levellers who sought more sweeping changes, including one man, one vote and freedom of conscience, particularly in religion.

Alarmed by what they viewed as the dangerous radicalism and increasing power of the New Model Army, in March 1647 the Presbyterian moderates who dominated the Long Parliament ordered the army to disband, a demand which was refused. In June, the army removed Charles from the custody of Parliament and in August established its headquarters at Putney, just outside the City of Westminster in South West London. Its senior officers or "Grandees" hoped the debates would end political divisions with the Agitators who represented the rank and file, and allow them to reach consensus on a peaceful settlement. Collectively, the two sides were grouped together into the Army Council.

The debates began on 28 October 1647 at St. Mary's Church, Putney and continued until 8 November, when senior officers including Thomas Fairfax, Oliver Cromwell, and Henry Ireton, grew concerned at the possible impact on military discipline and closed them down. The most contentious item was that of the right to vote: the Grandees wanted to restrict it to property-owners, but this was challenged by the Leveller spokesman, Colonel Thomas Rainsborough, who encapsulated his and the Levellers' position by saying:

" ...for really I thinke that the poorest hee that is in England hath a life to live as the greatest hee; and therefore truly, Sir, I thinke itt's cleare, that every man that is to live under a Governement ought first by his owne consent to putt himself under that Governement; and I do think that the poorest man in England is not at all bound in a strict sense to that Government that he hath not had a voice to put Himself under." (Putney Debates record book 1647, Worcester College, Oxford, MS 65. Spelling and capitalisation as in the original manuscript.)

== Background ==
Earlier that summer Sir Thomas Fairfax, Commander-in-Chief of the Army, Oliver Cromwell (then Member of Parliament for Cambridge and second-in-command), Henry Ireton (Cromwell's son-in-law) and other officers, known as the "Grandees", attempted to negotiate an inclusive settlement with Charles I of England in the aftermath of the First English Civil War. Termed the Heads of Proposals, these included provisions for social justice, but the monarchy and House of Lords would have retained a power of veto over the House of Commons. It also stipulated the king would be restored before the issues of the soldiers' indemnity for acts committed during the war and their arrears of pay were entrenched in law. This clear compromise position was contrary to the New Model Army's Declaration on 14 June and consequently the Heads lost the support of those seeking social reform (at the time generally called Levellers and radicals).

Sometime before October 1647, five of the most radical cavalry regiments elected new Agitators – known as the New Agents – to represent their views. The New Agents issued a political manifesto: The Case of the Armie Truly Stated. The fundamental ideas of the Case of the Armie came to be reflected in a written constitutional draft: the Agreement of the People.

The Putney Debates came about as a result of the publication of the Case of the Armie. According to the author of a book called A Call to all the Soldiers of the Armie (a work usually ascribed to John Wildman), Ireton was so incensed by the Case of the Armie that the New Agents were invited to debate the Case of the Armie before the General Council of the Army.

== Debates ==
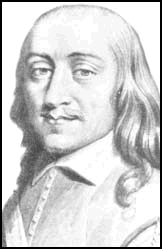
Colonel Thomas Rainsborough, the most senior officer to support the Leveller call for one man, one vote

The radicals wanted a constitution based upon one man, one vote, biennial Parliaments and a re-organisation of parliamentary constituencies. Authority was to be vested in the House of Commons rather than the King and Lords. Certain "native rights" were declared sacrosanct for all Englishmen: freedom of conscience, freedom from impressment (conscription) into the armed forces and equality before (when judged under or seeking a judgement under) the law.

Since Sir Thomas Fairfax was unwell and could not be present, Cromwell chaired the debates. He flatly refused to accept any compromise in which the King was overthrown, while his son-in-law, Henry Ireton, pressed the case that his own The Heads of the Proposals covered all of the concerns raised by the New Agents in The Case of the Armie. The New Agents accepted the meeting, sending Robert Everard (identified on the first day of the Putney Debates as 'Buff Coat') and another New Agent from Col. Whalley's Regiment only identified as 'Bedfordshire Man' (this was possibly Trooper Matthew Weale, a signatory of the Case of the Armie and the Agreement of the People). Other members of the Army present were Colonel Thomas Rainsborough, a successful commander in the Civil War, and lately MP for Droitwich, his brother Major William Rainsborough, and the Agitators Edward Sexby and William Allen. The New Agents also brought John Wildman and Maximillian Petty, two civilian advisors who had been involved with Army affairs since at least July 1647.

The debates opened on 28 October and were transcribed by secretary William Clarke and a team of stenographers. From 2 November however, all recording ceased. The debates were not reported and Clarke's minutes were not published at the time. They were lost until 1890 when they were rediscovered at the library of Worcester College, Oxford, and subsequently published as part of the Clarke Papers.

Cromwell and Ireton's main complaint about the Agreement was that it included terms for near universal male suffrage, which Ireton considered to be anarchy. Instead, they suggested suffrage should be limited only to landholders. The Agitators, on the other hand, felt they deserved the rights in payment for their service during the war. Thus Thomas Rainsborough argued:

For really I think that the poorest hee that is in England hath a life to live, as the greatest hee; and therefore truly, Sr, I think itt clear, that every Man that is to live under a Government ought first by his own Consent to put himself under that Government; and I do think that the poorest man in England is not at all bound in a strict sense to that Government that he hath not had a voice to put Himself under.

— Putney Debates record book 1647, Worcester College, Oxford, MS 65. Spelling and capitalisation as in the original manuscript.

And Ireton, for the Grandees:

no man hath a right to an interest or share in the disposing of the affairs of the kingdom... that hath not a permanent fixed interest in this kingdom.

== Conclusion ==
The debates concluded with the understanding that a modified version of the Agreement, approved by a committee chosen mainly from the ranks of the Army's officers, would be the basis of any future constitutional settlement and that it would be presented to the Army itself at a mass meeting. However, the Agitators wanted to discuss the future of the King, leading the Grandees, fearing a complete breakdown of discipline in the Army, to propose on 8 November that the Agitators and New Agents return at once to their regiments to restore order, thereby suspending the meetings. This was reinforced on 11 November when King Charles escaped from Hampton Court Palace, apparently fearing (possibly on the advice of Oliver Cromwell) that the Grandees could easily lose control of the more radical elements in the Army. The King's flight brought all debate to an end as the New Model Army was faced with a more immediate threat. On the same day, the General Council drafted a new manifesto to be presented at the mass meeting which contained, among other provisions, a clause in which the members of the army would sign a declaration of loyalty to Lord Fairfax and the General Council (and hence making further agitation when ordered to desist a mutinous offence).

The presentation itself was split from one mass meeting to three smaller ones. Those regiments invited to the first meeting on 15 November agreed with the manifesto, but two regiments arrived uninvited and objected, sparking the Corkbush Field mutiny. Fairfax and Cromwell suppressed the mutiny and at the other two meetings the other regiments agreed to the terms in the manifesto.

On 7 December 1647, at a meeting in Windsor the General Council drew up a non-political petition to present to Parliament called the Humble Representation of the General Council of the Army (which requested that Parliament pay the soldiers arrears and secure the future funding of the army), and a month later, on 8 January 1648, the General Council voted to terminate itself.

The symbolic importance of the debates may have been a factor, 36 years later, following the Restoration of the monarchy, when King Charles II chose Putney Heath as the site of a parade of 6,000 soldiers, in October 1684.

== See also ==
- English Civil War
- Timeline of the English Civil War, 1647
- Bishopsgate mutiny, April 1649
- Banbury mutiny, May 1649
