= Banbury mutiny =

Mutiny by soldiers in the English New Model Army

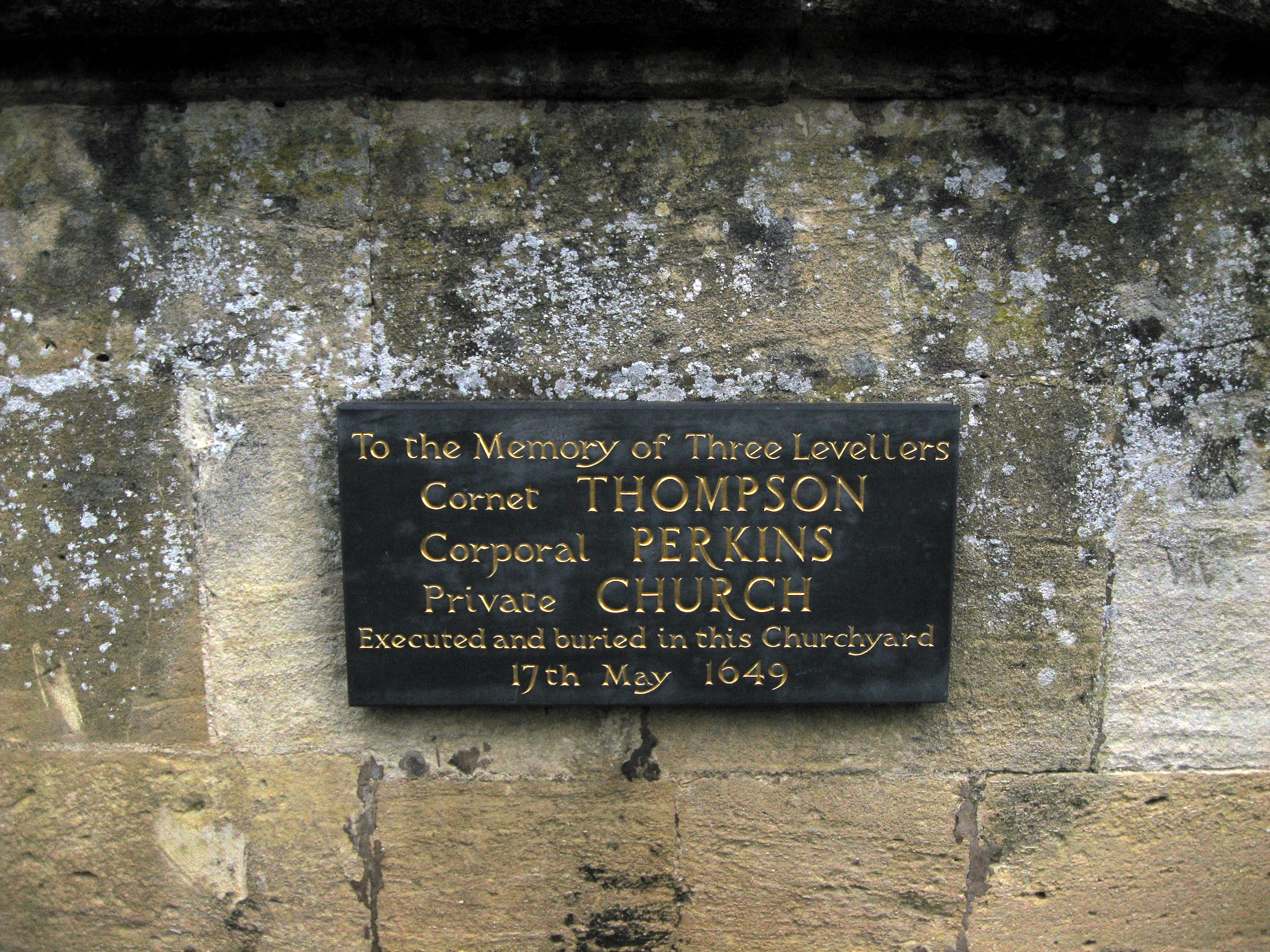
Plaque commemorating three Levellers executed by Oliver Cromwell in Burford

The Banbury mutiny was a mutiny by soldiers in the English New Model Army. The mutineers did not achieve all of their aims and some of the leaders were executed shortly afterwards on 17 May 1649.

== Background ==
The mutiny was over pay and political demands. The pay issue was defused by Oliver Cromwell acknowledging the justice of the soldiers' financial grievances and securing £10,000 towards payment of arrears from Parliament. But 400 troopers under the command of Captain William Thompson who were sympathetic to the Levellers set off from Banbury, where they were billeted, to speak with other regiments at Salisbury about their political demands.

Major White was sent by Cromwell and Thomas Fairfax to mediate with Thompson's troops and give assurances that force would not be used against them. However, on 13 May Cromwell launched a night attack. Several mutineers were killed in the skirmish. Captain Thompson escaped only to be killed a few days later in another skirmish near the Diggers community at Wellingborough. After being imprisoned in Burford Church with the other mutineers, three other leaders were shot: Private John Church, Corporal Perkins, and Cornet James Thompson (William Thompson's brother), on 17 May 1649. This destroyed the Levellers' power base in the New Model Army.

== Levellers' Day ==
Each year since 1975, Levellers' Day has been held in the Oxfordshire town of Burford to commemorate the three Levellers executed there. A different theme is chosen for each Levellers' Day, which is held on the Saturday nearest to 17 May, and speakers are invited to speak on the theme during the morning; this is followed by a procession around the town and a ceremony in the churchyard. In the afternoon there is music and other entertainment usually held in the garden of Warwick Hall which is next to the church. In 1979 a plaque to the three soldiers on the church wall was unveiled by Tony Benn to commemorate the event.

== See also ==
- English Civil War
- Putney Debates, 28 October to 8 November 1647
- Corkbush Field mutiny, 15 November 1647
- Bishopsgate mutiny, 24 - 27 April 1649
