= Heads of Proposals =

1647 peace plan after the English Civil War

The Heads of Proposals was a set of propositions intended to be a basis for a constitutional settlement after King Charles I was defeated in the First English Civil War. The authorship of the Proposals has been the subject of scholarly debate, although it has been suggested that it was drafted in the summer of 1647 by Commissary-General Henry Ireton and Major-General John Lambert.

== Background and Newcastle propositions ==
In 1646, King Charles I surrendered to the Scots and opened negotiations with Parliament. It demanded the Newcastle Propositions that included accepting the Scottish National Covenant, which would establish a Presbyterian form of church government in England, giving Parliament control of the Army for 20 years, and turn over key supporters for punishment. Charles refused to accept these stiff terms.

== Drafting the Proposals ==
In June 1647, the New Model Army seized King Charles I, entered a Solemn Engagement not to disband until their grievances had been redressed. The army then began to march towards London. Parliament sent negotiators to treat with the army leadership. As part of these negotiations, the army agreed to draft a series of proposals, laying out their blueprint for settling the kingdom and ending the strife of the Civil War. Henry Ireton and one other officer (probably John Lambert) were "sequestered" from the treaty negotiations and tasked with drawing up the proposals. On July 17, Ireton presented a draft of these "Heads of the Proposals" at a meeting of the General Council of the Army in Reading. In the Reading Debates, and in the two weeks that followed, these draft proposals were debated and fine-tuned. The King and his closest advisors were allowed to comment on the proposals, resulting in significant modifications. Also present at the Reading Debates on the Heads was a delegation of the army's most strenuous allies from London (including the future Levellers John Wildman, William Walwyn, and Maximilian Petty). The proposals may also have been edited in consultation with important Independent MPs and Lords, some of whom were present at Reading as part of parliament's negotiating team. Henry Ireton's surviving papers contain documents, some in Ireton's own hand, revealing the process of drafting and editing that produced the final version of the Heads. On August 1, after a final set of edits to address the king's objections, the army council approved a completed draft of the "Heads of the Proposals." Copies were sent to the King, Parliament and the City of London, and the completed peace plan was dispatched to be printed for public view.

== Main propositions ==
The main propositions were:

- Royalists had to wait five years before running for, or holding, an office.
- The Book of Common Prayer was allowed to be read but not mandatory, and no penalties should be made for not going to church, or attending other acts of worship.
- The sitting Parliament was to set a date for its own termination. Thereafter, biennial Parliaments were to be called (i.e. every two years), which would sit for a minimum of 120 days and maximum of 240 days. Constituencies were to be reorganized.
- Episcopacy would be retained in church government, but the power of the bishops would be substantially reduced.
- Parliament was to control the appointment of state officials and officers in the army and navy for 10 years.

== King Charles' reaction ==
Even after the occupation of London by the New Model Army had taken place, Parliament, instead of taking up the Heads of the Proposals as the basis of a settlement of the kingdom, sent to the King a revised edition of the Newcastle Propositions, differing mainly in that it proposed a limited toleration for dissentient Puritans, whilst forbidding all use of the book of Common Prayer. In his reply to their propositions, the King, on 14 September, expressed a preference for the Proposals of the Army, as more conducive "to the satisfaction of all interests and a fitter foundation for a lasting peace". Major Huntington's letter shows that the King expected the leaders of the Army to stand by him in procuring an offer of better terms from parliament.

The question of a new treaty was discussed in the House of Commons on 22 and 23 September 1647. Henry Marten and his party were eager for the passing of a vote to make no further addresses to the King. Cromwell and Ireton, on the other hand, opposed Marten's motion, and the House finally resolved on 23 September that they would once again make application to the King. This decision led to much discontent amongst the Levelling party in the Army as also outside of it, and "the credit and reputation" of both Cromwell and Ireton was much blasted thereby. They were accused of falsely representing it to be the desire and sense of the Army that this new application should be made to the King. The charge is thus stated by Wildman in his Putney Projects (p. 43).

Because Oliver Cromwell and Henry Ireton negotiated with the King, they lost the army radicals' support. The radicals criticized their "servility" to the king. Without an amicable solution between the Army, King, English Parliament, and the Scots the Second English Civil War started.

== Historical importance ==
Although the "Heads of Proposals" was never adopted, Ireton promoted it in the Putney Debates. He presented it as a moderate alternative to the Agreement of the People. Elements of "Heads of Proposals" were incorporated in the Instrument of Government. The Instrument of Government was the written constitution that defined Oliver Cromwell's powers as Lord Protector. The religious settlement proposed by Ireton in 1647 was virtually identical to that finally adopted in the Toleration Act 1688.
