= Act abolishing the kingship =

Act of the Parliament of England

The act abolishing the kingship was an act of the Rump Parliament that abolished the monarchy in England in the aftermath of the Second English Civil War.

In the days following the execution of Charles I on 30 January 1649, Parliament debated the form that any future government should take. On 7 February, Parliament voted down the idea of continuing the monarchy and the act to abolish the office of King was formally passed on 17 March.

On 8 May 1660, the Convention Parliament proclaimed Charles II to have been lawful king of England since his father's death, leading to the restoration of the monarchy.

Following the Restoration the act was declared void because it had not received royal assent.
