= Maximilian Petty =

English lawyer and politician

Maximilian Petty (c. 1583 – 1639) was an English lawyer and politician who sat in the House of Commons from 1628 to 1629.

Petty was the son of John Petty of Talmage. He matriculated at Brasenose College, Oxford on 13 October 1598, aged 15 and was awarded BA on 18 June 1602. He was called to the bar at Lincoln's Inn in 1611. In 1628, Petty was elected member of parliament for Westbury and sat until 1629 when King Charles decided to rule without parliament for eleven years.

Petty died at the age of about 55 and was buried at Thame on 26 August 1639.

Petty married by licence dated 29 October 1618, Elizabeth Mayney, widow of John Mayney of Chalfont St. Giles, Buckinghamshire.

Parliament of England
Preceded by Sir Walter Long, 1st Baronet; Thomas Hopton	Member of Parliament for Westbury; 1628–1629; With: Charles Thynne	Parliament suspended until 1640
