= Solemn Engagement =

English army declaration of 1647

The Solemn Engagement (A Solemne Engagement of the Army, under the Command of his Excellency Sir Thomas Fairfax) was a declaration to the English House of Commons adopted unanimously by the General Council of the Army commanded by Thomas Fairfax at Newmarket on 29 May 1647. Acting in response to a parliamentary threat of disbandment, the document asserted that the army would not disband until satisfactory terms were negotiated. This was in part because of weeks of arrears owed to the soldiers, and in frustration of the slow progress parliament had made in securing a settlement with the imprisoned Charles I.

== Events ==
The agreement was read, and assented to by all the officers and soldiers of the regiments of the New Model Army that rendezvoused on Kentford Heath near Newmarket on Friday and Saturday 4 and 5 June. On 8 June Fairfax sent the Solemn Engagement to Parliament with a letter.

In the letter he explained that because the King was now with the Army (Cornet Joyce having taken Charles I from Parliament's custody at Holdenby House), it had been agreed on 7 June that Charles would be held at Newmarket Palace under the guard of two regiments of Ironsides. So that the Army and Parliament's commissioners could discuss the Engagement, without the King present, Fairfax moved the rendezvous with the commissioners to "Triploe Heath" at 9 o'clock in on Thursday 10 June, which was as soon as was practicable. (Note: Triploe Heath is 8 miles south of Cambridge, and now spelt Thriplow Heath)

At the Triploe Heath rendezvous the commissioners offers failed to pacify the New Model Army, largely because the officers and men were aware of the steps that Parliament and the City of London were taking against the Army, including an attempt to set up a rival army for which they were willing to pay while still withholding arrears of pay from the New Model Army. The Army rejected the commissioners offer and continued their slow advance towards London.

== See also ==
- English Commonwealth
- Good Old Cause
