= An Agreement of the People =

Set of declarations made to change the English state

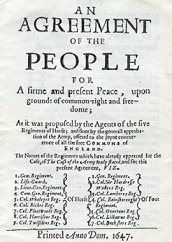
An Agreement of the People, 1647

An Agreement of the People was a series of manifestos, published between 1647 and 1649, for constitutional changes to the English state. Several versions of the Agreement were published, each adapted to address not only broad concerns but also specific issues during the fast changing revolutionary political environment of those years. The Agreements of the People have been most associated as the manifestos of the Levellers but were also published by the Agitators and the General Council of the New Model Army.

The major tenets of the first version of the Agreement were: freedom of religion, the frequent convening of new parliaments and equality before the law. These tenets also appeared in the later versions of the manifesto. As these basic proposals were queried, other provisions were added; for example Roman Catholics were exempt from the right to religious freedom, and the electorate was to be made up of "all men of the age of one and twenty years and upwards (not being servants, or receiving alms, or having served in the late King in Arms or voluntary Contributions)." The Levellers hoped to base England's new constitution on the Agreement But in the end, the New Model Army based their demands on an alternative less revolutionary document, the Heads of Proposals, that was proposed and supported by the Grandees (senior officers) of the Army.

A century later, the Agreement is believed to have "greatly influence[ed] the development of the U.S. Constitution."

== Versions ==
Major published versions of the Agreement include:

- "An Agreement of the People for a firme and present Peace, upon grounds of common right and freedome ...", presented to the Army Council in October 1647.
- "An Agreement of the People of England, and the places therewith incorporated, for a secure and present peace, upon grounds of common right, freedom and safety", presented to the Rump Parliament in January 1649.
- "AN AGREEMENT OF THE Free People of England. Tendered as a Peace-Offering to this distressed Nation", extended version from the Leveller leaders, "Lieutenant Colonel John Lilburne, Master William Walwyn, Master Thomas Prince, and Master Richard Overton, Prisoners in the Tower of London, May the 1. 1649."

== Development ==
Soon after the First English Civil War, the Agreement was the subject of the Putney Debates in 1647. The major tenets of this first version of the Agreement were: freedom of religion, the frequent convening of new parliaments and equality before the law. These tenets also appeared in the later versions of the manifesto. As these basic proposals were queried, other provisions were added; for example Roman Catholics were exempt from the right to religious freedom, and the electorate was to be made up of "all men of the age of one and twenty years and upwards (not being servants, or receiving alms, or having served in the late King in Arms or voluntary Contributions)."

The Levellers hoped to base England's new constitution on the Agreement of the People. But in the end, the New Model Army based their demands on an alternative less revolutionary document, the Heads of Proposals, that was proposed and supported by the Grandees (senior officers) of the Army.

The Agreement is believed to have "greatly influence[ed] the development of the U.S. Constitution."

== Legacy ==
American libertarian David Boaz called the Agreement "the first well-developed statement of libertarianism", noting its support for "self-ownership, private property, legal equality, religious toleration, and limited, representative government."

== See also ==
- English Commonwealth
- Instrument of Government
