= Richard Overton (Leveller) =

English pamphleteer (fl.1640–1664)

Richard Overton (fl. 1640–1664) was an English pamphleteer and Leveller during the Civil War and Interregnum (England). (Note: Little is known of the early life of Overton and using different sources his birth has been placed as either shortly before 1600 or a decade and a half later. (Gibbons 2010))

== Biography ==
=== Early life ===
Richard Overton may have spent part of his early life in Holland, although some of his writings show an interest in agricultural issues such as the enclosure of common land and may indicate that instead of living in the Netherlands he spent his early years in rural England, possibly Lincolnshire, a county in which the surname Overton was common. A Richard Overton matriculated as a sizar from Queens' College, Cambridge, at Easter 1631, and may be the very same subject of this biography.

=== First pamphlets and satires ===
He is known to have begun publishing anonymous attacks on the bishops about the time of the opening of the Long Parliament, together with some pungent verse satires, like Lambeth Fayre and Articles of High Treason against Cheapside Cross, 1642.

=== Man's Mortality ===
Overton turned next to theology, and wrote an anonymous tract during the civil war on Man's Mortality. (Note: Man's Mortality, 4to, 1643) This he described as "a treatise wherein 'tis proved, both by theology and philosophy, that whole man (as a rational creature) is a compound wholly mortal, contrary to that common distinction of soul and body: and that the present going of the soul into heaven or hell is a mere fiction; and that at the resurrection is the beginning of our immortality, and then actual condemnation and salvation, and not before". Ecclesiastes. chapter iii., verse 19 is quoted as a motto, and the tract is signed "R. O.", and said to be "printed by John Canne" at Amsterdam. According to Thomason's note in the British Museum copy, it appeared on 19 January 1644, and was really printed in London.

The tract created a great stir, and a small sect arose known as "Soul Sleepers", who adopted Overton's doctrine in a slightly modified form. On 26 August 1644, the House of Commons, on the petition of the Stationers' Company, ordered that the authors, printers, and publishers of the pamphlets against the immortality of the soul and concerning divorce should be diligently inquired for, thus coupling Overton with Milton as the most dangerous of heretics. Daniel Featley in the Dippers Dipt and Thomas Edwards (1599–1647) in Gangræn both denounced the unknown author, the latter asserting that Clement Wrighter "had a great hand in the book".

=== Martin Marpriest ===
Meanwhile, Overton had commenced a violent onslaught against the Westminster assembly, under the pseudonym of "Martin Marpriest", who was represented as the son of Martin Marprelate, the antagonist of the Elizabethan bishops. The series of tracts he issued under this name, of which the chief are The Arraignment of Mr. Persecution, Martin's Echo, and A Sacred Synodical Decretal, were published clandestinely in 1646, with fantastic printers' names appended to them. The Decretal is a supposed order of the Westminster assembly for the author's arrest, purporting to be "printed by Martin Claw-Clergy, printer to the reverend Assembly of Divines, for Bartholomew Bang-priest, and are to be sold at his shop in Toleration Street, at the sign of the Subjects' Liberty, right opposite to Persecuting Court". Prynne denounced these tracts to parliament as the quintessence of scurrility and blasphemy demanding the punishment of the writer, whom he supposed to be Henry Robinson. Overton's authorship was suspected, but could not be proven. He did not own his responsibility till 1649, when the assembly of divines had come to an end.

=== Against the Lords ===
In 1646, Overton, who had been concerned in printing some of Lilburne's pamphlets, took up his case against the Lords, and published An Alarum to the House of Lords against their Insolent Usurpation of the common Liberties and Rights of this Nation, manifested in their Attempts against Lieutenant-colonel John Lilburne, An Alarum... 4to, 1646. For this he was arrested by order of the house on 11 August 1646 and, refusing to acknowledge their jurisdiction, was committed to Newgate. Yet in spite of his confinement, he contrived to publish a narrative of his arrest, entitled A Defiance against all Arbitrary Usurpations, and a still more violent attack on the peers, called An Arrow shot from the Prison of Newgate into the Prerogative Bowels of the Arbitrary House of Lords. His wife, Mary Overton, and his brother Thomas were also imprisoned for similar offences.

The New Model Army took up the cause of Overton and his fellow prisoners, and required that they should be either legally tried or released. He was unconditionally released on 16 September 1647. This imprisonment did not diminish Overton's democratic zeal. He had a great share in promoting the petition of the London levellers on 11 September 1648. He was also one of those who presented to Fairfax on 28 December 1648 the Plea for Common Right and Freedom, a protest against the alterations made by the council of the army in Lilburne's draft of the Agreement of the People.

=== Second imprisonment ===
On 28 March 1649, he was arrested, with Lilburne and two other leaders of the Levellers, as one of the authors of England's new Chains Discovered. A refusal to acknowledge the authority of the Council of State or to answer their questions, caused his committal to the Tower. In conjunction with three fellow-prisoners he issued, on 1 May 1649, the An Agreement of the People, followed on 14 April by a pamphlet denying the charge that they sought to overthrow property and social order.

=== Release ===
On his own account he published on 2 July 1649 a Defiance to the government, in the form of a letter addressed to the citizens usually meeting at the Whalebone in Lothbury, behind the Royal Exchange, a place which was the headquarters of the London Levellers. The failure of the government to obtain a verdict against Lilburne involved the release of his associates, and on 8 November Overton's liberation was arranged. The only condition was that he should take the engagement to be faithful to the Commonwealth, which he probably had no hesitation in doing. In September 1654 Overton proposed to turn spy, and so offered his services to Thurloe for the discovery of plots against the Lord Protector's government. In the following spring he was implicated in the projected rising of the Levellers, and fled to Flanders in company with Lieutenant-colonel Sexby. There, through the agency of Sir Marmaduke Langdale (afterwards Lord Langdale), he applied to Charles II, and received a royal commission. Some months later he returned to England, supplied with Spanish money by Sexby, and charged to bring about an insurrection.

=== Later life ===
Overton's later history is obscure. He was again in prison during December 1659, and his arrest was ordered on 22 October 1663, for apparently printing something against the government of Charles II.

== Works ==
It is difficult to give a complete list of Overton's works, as many are anonymous. The chief are the following:

- Monopolists as Frogs and Vermin, 1641.
- New Lambeth Fair newly Consecrated, wherein all Rome's Relics are set at sale (a satire in verse), 1642.
- Articles of High Treason exhibited against Cheapside Cross, with the last Will and Testament of the said Cross (a satire in verse), 1642.
- Man's Mortality, Amsterdam, 1643; a second and enlarged edition was published in 1655, in 8vo, entitled Man wholly Mortal.
- The Arraignment of Mr. Persecution … by Reverend young Martin Marpriest, 1645.
- A Sacred Synodical Decretal for the Apprehension of Martin Marpriest, 1645.
- Martin's Echo; or a Remonstrance from his Holiness, Master Marpriest [about 1645].
- An Alarum to the House of Lords, 1646.
- A Defence against all arbitrary Usurpations, either of the House of Lords or any other, 1646.
- An Arrow against all Tyrants or Tyranny, 1646.
- The Commoners' Complaint, 1646.
- The Outcries of oppressed Commons (by Lilburne and Overton jointly), 1647.
- An Appeal from the Degenerate Representative Body, the Commons of England, assembled at Westminster, to the … Free People in general, and especially to his Excellency, Sir Thomas Fairfax, 1647.
- The Copy of a Letter written to the General from Lieutenant-colonel Lilburne and Mr. Overton on behalf of Mr. Lockyer, 1649.
- A Picture of the Council of State (by Overton and three others), 1649.
- A Manifestation of Lieutenant-colonel Lilburne and Mr. Overton, &c., 1649.
- An Agreement of the Free People of England tendered as a Peace-offering to this distressed Nation, by Lieutenant-colonel Lilburne, Mr. Overton, &c., 1649.
- Overton's Defiance of Act of Pardon, 1649.
- The Baiting of the Great Bull of Bashan, 1649. There are also a number of petitions addressed by Overton to the two houses of parliament.
