= Agitators =

Elected soldiers' representatives during the English Civil War

- Dates active: 1647–1648
- Country: England
- Allegiance: Parliament
- Ideology: Liberalism
- Part of: New Model Army

The Agitators were a political movement as well as elected representatives of soldiers, including members of the New Model Army under General the Lord Fairfax, during the English Civil War. They were also known as adjutators. Many of the ideas of the movement were later adopted by the Levellers.

== History ==
Agitators, or adjutators, was the name given to representatives elected in 1647 by the different regiments of the English Parliamentary army. The word really means an agent, but it was confused with "adjutant," often called "agitant," a title familiar to the soldiers, and thus the form "adjutator" came into use.

Early in 1647 the Long Parliament wished either to disband many of the regiments or to send them to Ireland. The soldiers, whose pay was largely in arrears, refused to accept either alternative, and eight of the cavalry regiments elected agitators, called at first commissioners, who laid their grievances before the three generals, and whose letter was read in the House of Commons on the 30 April 1647. The other regiments followed the example of the cavalry (nicknamed Ironsides), and the agitators, who belonged to the lower ranks of the army, were supported by many of the officers, who showed their sympathy by signing the Declaration of the army.

Fairfax, Cromwell and other generals succeeded to some extent in pacifying the troops by promising the payment of arrears for eight weeks at once; but before the return of the generals to London parliament had again decided to disband the army, and soon afterwards fixed the 1 June as the date on which this process was to begin.

Again alarmed, the agitators decided to resist; a mutiny occurred in one regiment and the attempt at disbandment failed. Then followed the seizure of King Charles I by Cornet Joyce. The Agitators, with two officers from each regiment and the generals formed a new body called the Army Council which after a meeting near Newmarket, Suffolk on Friday 4 June 1647 issued "A Solemne Engagement of the Army, under the Command of his Excellency Sir Thomas Fairfax" to Parliament on 8 June making their concerns known, and also the constitution of the Army Council so that Parliament would understand that the discontent was army-wide and had the support of both officers and other ranks. This Engagement was read out to the army at a general meeting on 5 June.

A few weeks later, there was another meeting while the army was camped at Thriplow Heath near Royston, the soldiers refused the offers made by Parliament, and the agitators demanded a march towards London and the "purging" of the House of Commons, which did not happen. Subsequent events are part of the general history of England. Gradually the agitators ceased to exist, but many of their ideas were adopted by the Levellers, who may perhaps be regarded as their successors. Gardiner says of them, "Little as it was intended at the time, nothing was more calculated than the existence of this elected body of agitators to give to the army that distinctive political and religious character which it ultimately bore".
