= William Walwyn =

English leveller

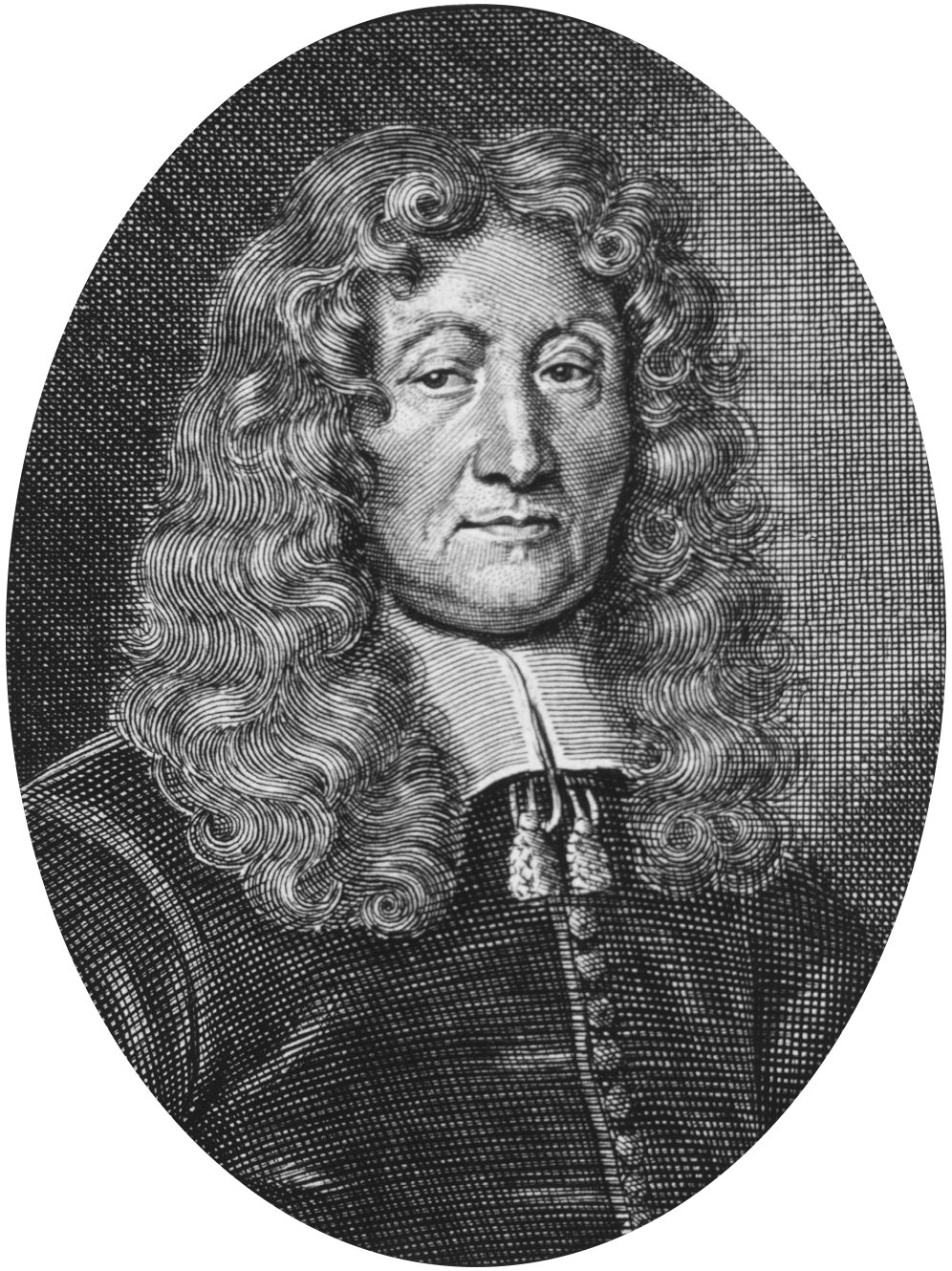
Walwyn

William Walwyn (bap. 1600–1681) was an English pamphleteer, a Leveller and a medical practitioner.

== Life ==
Walwyn was a silkman in London who took the parliamentary side in the English Civil War. He advocated religious toleration and emerged as a leader of the Levellers in 1647, which led to his imprisonment in 1649.

In October 1645 Walwyn published England's Lamentable Slaverie, his famous rebuke to John Lilburne, in which he criticised his fellow Leveller for a misguided reliance on Magna Carta of 1215 as the foundation for citizens' rights. He argued that Magna Carta was "more precious in your [Lilburne's] esteem than it deserveth", dismissing it as a small set of concessions "wrestled out of the pawes" of Norman conquerors and describing it as, "a messe of pottage" and, (in the following year), "but a beggerly thing containing many marks of intollerable bondage". Walwyn's critique of the appeal to Magna Carta was compelling and fundamentally accurate, and he proposed instead a fresh charter, a proto-social contract founded on equity and right reason, rather than on compromised accretions of the law.

During 1646 he wrote five pamphlets in response to Thomas Edwards' Gangraena, in which Walwyn was described as "a Seeker, a dangerous man, a strong head". In 1649, while held in the Tower of London on a charge of Treason, he published "The Fountain of Slaunder Discovered" and "Walwyns Just Defence" to defend his character against the publication of "Walwyn's Wiles". The pamphlet had seven authors who were the leading Baptist and Independent preachers in London at the time Arnald, Burnet, Foster, Kiffin, Lordall, Price, and Rosier, but was mainly drafted by John Price who had previously attacked Walwyn in print after four of the Leveller petitions were burnt by the common hangman in June 1647 (see "Gold Tried in the Fire"). In Price's opinion it was Walwyn, not Lilburne, who was the most dangerous of the Leveller leaders. In 1653, when Lilburne was arrested having returned from exile in Bruges, Overton and Prince rallied support, Walwyn however was arrested and held in the tower until Lilburne's trial was concluded.

William Walwyn died in 1681 and was buried in the New Churchyard, Bethlem, where John Lilburne and other members of the Walwyn family were also buried.

== Walwyn's Wiles ==
This pamphlet was written by seven of the leading London Independent and Baptist preachers and published whilst Walwyn and the other Leveller leaders were held in the tower. The full title was "Walwyn's Wiles, or the Manifestators manifested, ... declaring the subtle and crafy wiles, the atheistical, blasphemous soul-murdering principles and practices of Mr William Walwyn". Walwyn's Wiles was a response to the jointly signed Leveller pamphlet "A Manifestation" (April 14, 1649) which whilst it denied that they intended to level men's estates also stood firm on the principles outlined in The Agreement of the People.

In the ten pages of Wiles Walwyn is variously described as a Jesuit, a bigamist, of having persuaded a woman to commit suicide, and that he would "destroy all government", that he had said "that it would never be well until all things were common", and that he had also said that there would be "no need for judges ... take any other tradesman that is an honest and just man and let him hear the case".

In response Walwyn published two pamphlets "The Fountain of Slaunder Discovered" in which he defended his morality, and which had written a year before but held back from publication. The second pamphlet was a direct response to Wiles as its full title "Walwyns Just Defence against the Aspertions Cast upon him, in a Late Un-Christian Pamphlet Entitled, Walwyns Wiles" makes clear. The Just Defence contains a great deal of detail of the Leveller movement and the Independents from 1646 onwards.

== Works ==
Political and Religious Writing

- A New Petition of the Papists 1641
- Some Considerations Tending to the Undeceiving Those, Whose Judgements Are Misinformed 1642
- The Power of Love 1643
- The Compassionate Samaritane 1644
- Good Counsell to All 1644
- A Help to the Right Understanding of a Discourse Concerning Independency 1644/5
- Englands Lamentable Slaverie 1645
- Tolleration Justified and Persecution Condemned 1645/6
- A Whisper in the Eare of Mr. Thomas Edwards, Minister 1645/6
- A Word More to Mr Thomas Edwards ... Concerning the National Covenant 1645/6
- A Word in Season: To All Sorts of Well Minded People 1646
- An Antidote against Master Edwards 1646
- The Just Man in Bonds 1646
- A Remonstrance of many Thousand Citizens (a collaboration with Richard Overton) 1646
- A Prediction of Mr Edwards His Conversion and Recantation 1646
- A Demurre to the Bill for Preventing the Growth and Spreading of Heresie 1646
- A Parable, or Consultation of Physitians upon Master Edwards 1646
- A Still and Soft Voice from the Scripture 1647
- Gold Tried in the Fire; or, The Burnt Petitions Revived 1647
- The Bloody Project 1648
- The Vanitie of the Present Churches 1648/9
- A Manifestation (jointly signed) 1649
- An Agreement of the Free People of England (jointly signed) 1649
- The Fountain of Slaunder Discovered 1649
- Walwyns Just Defence 1649
- Juries Justified 1651
- W Walwyns Conceptions; For a Free Trade 1652

Medical Writing

- Spirits Moderated 1654
- Healths New Store-House Opened 1661
- A Touch-Stone for Physick 1667
- A Physick for Families 1669
