= Nathaniel Rich (soldier) =

17th-century English Puritan radical and soldier

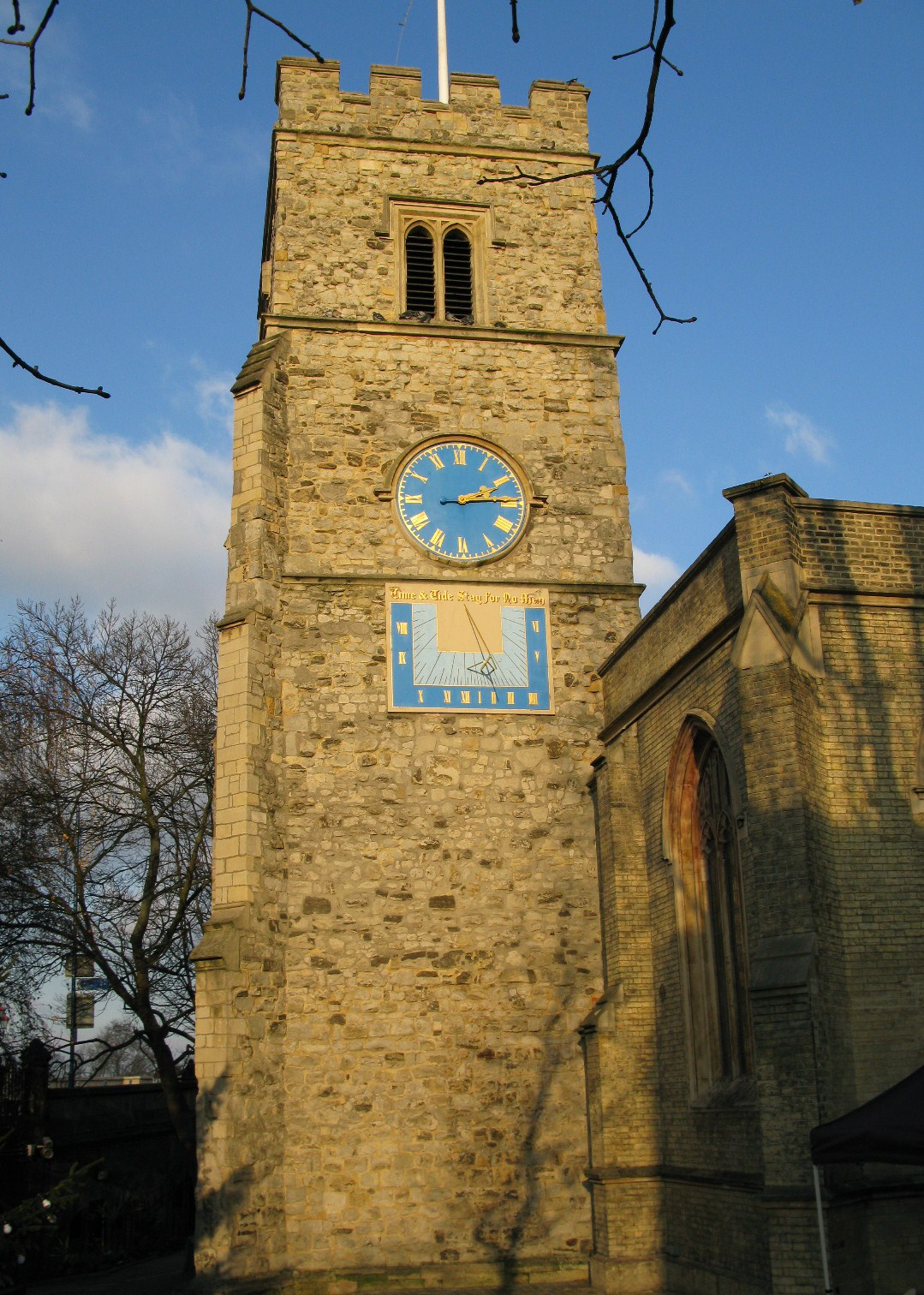
- St. Mary's Church, Putney, location of the 1647 Putney Debates; Rich was a leading participant

Captain of Deal Castle
- In office 1648–1653

Member of Parliament for Cirencester
- In office February 1648 (Note: Parliament suspended April 1653, reseated May 1659) – March 1660

Personal details
- Born: c. 1622 Felsted, Essex, England
- Died: 1701 to 1702, age 79 (approximate) Stondon Massey, Essex, England
- Spouse(s): (1) Elizabeth Hampden (1644–1655 her death) (2) Lady Elizabeth Kerr (1663–his death)
- Children: Nathaniel (before 1648, after 1702); Robert (ca.1648–1699); unnamed daughter
- Education: St Catharine's College, Cambridge; Gray's Inn
- Occupation: Puritan radical and soldier

Military service
- Allegiance: Parliamentarians
- Rank: Colonel
- Battles/wars: Wars of the Three Kingdoms; Powick Bridge; Edgehill; Winceby; Marston Moor; Second Newbury; Naseby; Langport; Second Siege of Bristol; Torrington; Third Siege of Oxford; Maidstone

Colonel Nathaniel Rich (c. 1620–1622 to 1701–1702) was a member of the landed gentry from Essex, who sided with Parliament during the Wars of the Three Kingdoms. He has been described as "an example of those pious Puritan gentlemen who were inspired by the ideals of the English Revolution".

Initially a close associate of Oliver Cromwell, he served as a colonel in the New Model Army, and was elected MP for Cirencester in 1648. The two men later fell out due to Rich's support for the Fifth Monarchists, a radical religious group that opposed Cromwell's appointment as Lord Protector in 1653.

Although Rich was removed from the army and lost much of his influence as a result, he remained a committed republican and opposed the Stuart Restoration in May 1660. Since he had not participated in the Execution of Charles I, he was pardoned under the Indemnity and Oblivion Act, but arrested in January 1661 during the short-lived uprising led by his fellow Fifth Monarchist, Thomas Venner. Released in 1665, he lived quietly on his estate in Essex until his death sometime between October 1700 and March 1702, one of the few senior officers of the New Model to survive into the 18th century.

== Personal details ==
Nathaniel Rich was born in Felsted, Essex, eldest son of Robert Rich (died c. 1630) and Elizabeth Dutton; the precise birthdate is unknown but was probably sometime between 1620 and 1622. (Note: Since he was still a legal minor in 1636, he could not have been older than 20, while he graduated from Cambridge University in 1637, at a time when most did so at the age of 15 to 16) A junior member of the powerful and well connected Rich family, he was related to Robert Rich, 2nd Earl of Warwick, commander of the Parliamentarian navy from 1643 to 1649, as well as his younger brother Henry Rich, 1st Earl of Holland, executed by Parliament in March 1649.

In January 1644, he married Elizabeth (c. 1625–1655), daughter of Sir Edmund Hampden and cousin of John Hampden, the Parliamentarian leader killed at the Battle of Chalgrove Field in 1643. They had three children, Nathaniel (before 1648, after 1702), Robert (1648–1699), and a daughter, of whom little is known. In 1663, Lady Elizabeth Kerr became his second wife; they had no children and his will left her a life interest in his lands, which reverted to his son Nathaniel on her death. His younger son Robert married Mary Rich, a distant cousin, and in 1677 inherited the title and estates of his father-in-law, Sir Charles Rich.

== Wars of the Three Kingdoms ==
Oliver Cromwell, whom Rich served with in the Eastern Association and New Model Army; the two were close associates until 1654

His father died when he was young. Further, in 1636, Rich inherited the manor of Stondon Massey in Essex from his recently deceased uncle, Sir Nathaniel Rich. He began his education at Felsted School, whose pupils included four sons of Oliver Cromwell, and was supervised by Samuel Wharton, a "godly" minister appointed by the devoutly Puritan Earl of Warwick. In 1637 he graduated from St Catharine's College, Cambridge, then known for its Puritan teachings, and in August 1639 started training as a lawyer at Gray's Inn in London.

With this background, it was natural for him to support Parliament when the First English Civil War began in August 1642. The Earl of Essex was appointed commander of the Parliamentarian army, and Rich enlisted in his personal troop of Lifeguards, made up of colleagues from the Inns of Court. This unit fought in two of the earliest battles of the war, Powick Bridge in September and Edgehill in October 1642. In summer 1643, he transferred to the army of the Eastern Association as captain of a cavalry troop in the Earl of Manchester's regiment. He had reached the rank of lieutenant-colonel by the time it took part in the decisive Battle of Marston Moor in July 1644.

In the recriminations that followed the alleged failure to follow up victory at Marston Moor and the botched Second Battle of Newbury in October 1644, Rich was one of the witnesses on whom Cromwell relied in his attack on Manchester and Essex that led to their removal under the Self-denying Ordinance. Promoted colonel and his regiment absorbed into the New Model Army in February 1645, his appointment was initially rejected by the House of Commons. (Note: The reason given was his youth, but his support for Cromwell's attack on Manchester and Essex is the more likely explanation) Confirmed in time to fight at Naseby in June, Rich then participated in various actions during the 1645 to 1646 campaign that won control of South West England. The loss of this region destroyed the Royalist army as a viable military force, and when the war ended with the Third Siege of Oxford in June 1646, Sir Thomas Fairfax appointed Rich one of the commissioners who negotiated its surrender. In the 1647 Recruiter election, he and Fairfax were returned as MPs for Cirencester, although they did not formally take their seats until February 1649.

Rich's Kent campaign, 1648

In the power struggle between the army and Parliament that followed victory, Rich was initially viewed as a moderate and discouraged petitioning by the Agitators who represented the rank and file. However, when Parliament tried to disband the New Model without settling their pay arrears, he supported his regiment's refusal to comply and helped draft the Heads of Proposals, which set out the army's conditions for a peace settlement with Charles I. Largely prepared by the senior officers or "Grandees", they were denounced by the Agitators as insufficient, leading to the October to November 1647 Putney Debates in which the two sides sought to reach internal agreement. Rich was a prominent participant in these talks and like most of the Grandees opposed Agitator demands for "One man, one vote".

After a series of disturbances in the City of London, in January 1648, Rich's regiment was based in the Royal Mews to guard Parliament and put down a pro-Royalist riot in April, just after the outbreak of the Second English Civil War. On 1 June, he joined the army under Fairfax sent to suppress the rising in Kent and took part in the storming of Maidstone. He was then detached to relieve the port of Dover, before going on to retake Walmer Castle, Deal, and Sandown Castle from the Royalists, a process he completed with great efficiency by the end of August. Following its recapture, he was appointed Governor or Captain of Deal Castle, a position he retained until 1653.

== The Interregnum ==
Attitudes hardened after the Royalist defeat in the Second Civil War and a significant group, including Cromwell, now concluded further negotiations with Charles were pointless and thus he had to be removed. In December 1648, Pride's Purge excluded MPs considered opponents of the army like Denzil Holles, creating a reduced body of 210 known as the Rump Parliament, most of whom were in favour of putting the king on trial. (Note: This did not imply support for his execution, for which the numbers at this time were substantially lower.) Although Rich supported the creation of the Commonwealth of England, he doubted the legality of the High Court of Justice for the trial of Charles I and refused to sit on it, while he did not take his seat in Parliament until February 1649, after the king's execution in January. (Note: The official record suggests this was because polling had been disrupted by Royalist sympathisers, but Rich, Fairfax and others may have delayed doing so because in 1647 the Long Parliament re-affirmed the Self-denying Ordinance, and also required all MPs to subscribe to the Presbyterian-backed Solemn League and Covenant.)

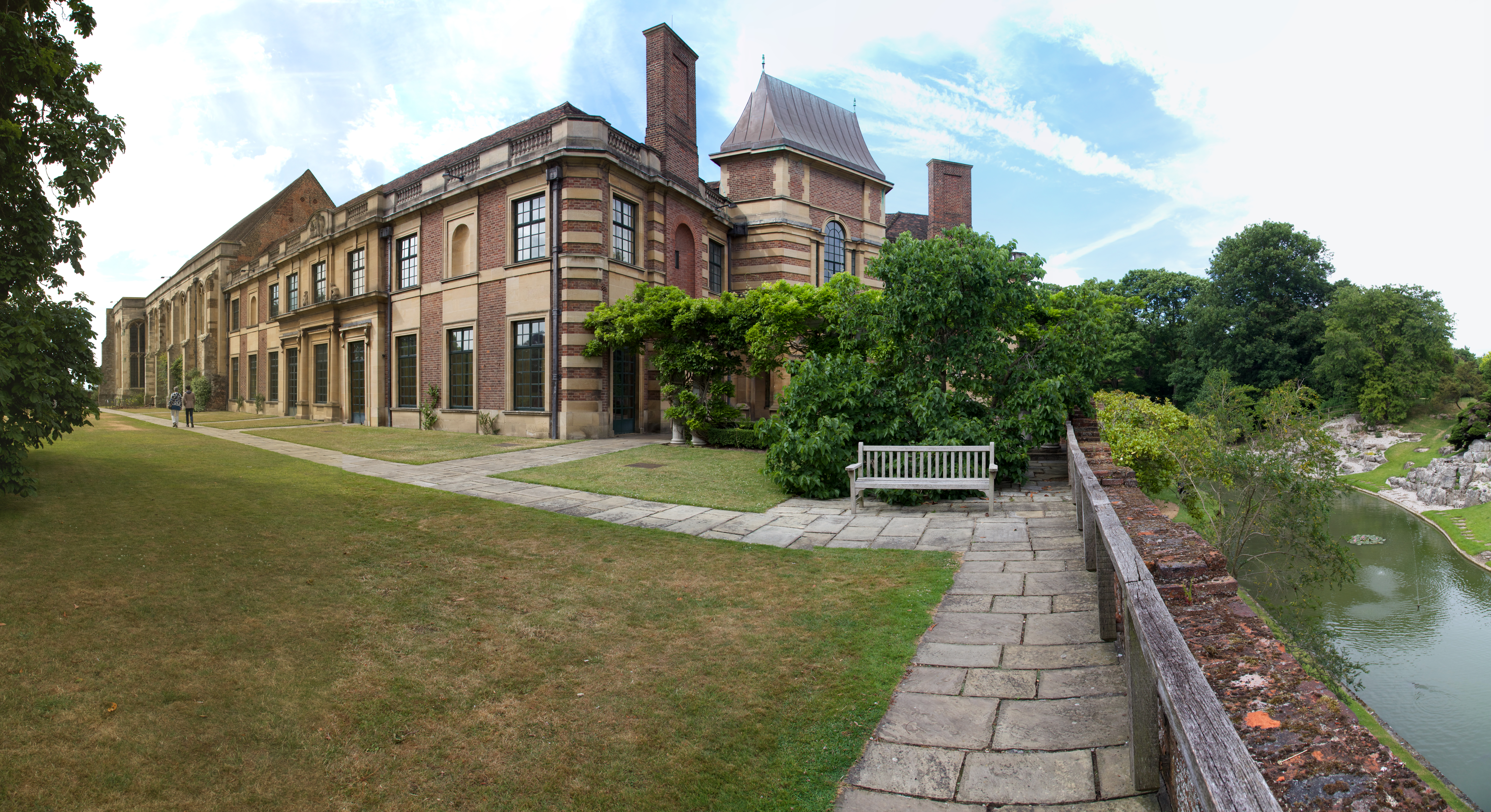
Eltham Palace; Rich acquired substantial parts of its park and woodlands between 1651 and 1653

Despite avoiding active participation in Charles' trial and execution, Rich remained loyal to Cromwell, and in December 1650 put down a Royalist rising in Norfolk. He benefitted from his new status by acquiring estates confiscated from the crown near Eltham Palace in Kent and High Easter in Essex, and played a prominent role in supporting the army in Parliament. However, objections to the cost of financing the New Model and the First Anglo-Dutch War meant the Rump grew increasingly hostile to the new regime, which led Cromwell to dismiss it in April 1653. Like other Fifth Monarchists such as Major Generals Thomas Harrison and Robert Overton, Rich supported its replacement by the nominated "Barebones Parliament" in July 1653, but broke with Cromwell when he dissolved this body in December and became Lord Protector.

Along with several officers from his regiment, Rich was associated with the "Petition of the three colonels", a document widely circulated within the New Model attacking Cromwell's assumption of power, and he was dismissed from the army in 1654. He was arrested and brought before the English Council of State in 1655 for describing The Protectorate as an illegitimate government and justifying the right of individuals to take up arms against it. Released in early 1656, he was among the MPs excluded from the Second Protectorate Parliament in July 1656. It has been suggested he was viewed as a serious threat to the state, given his military connections and the influence of the Rich family in Essex and Suffolk, with several of the MPs who were permitted to take their seats linked to him or his relative, the Earl of Warwick.

Cromwell's death in September 1658 and the succession of his son Richard led to a power struggle between the army and the Third Protectorate Parliament, which was dominated by crypto-Royalists and moderate Presbyterians similar to those excluded in December 1648. In April 1659, a group of senior officers known as the Wallingford House party compelled Richard Cromwell to resign and reinstate the surviving members of the Rump. Among them was Rich, who was re-appointed colonel of his regiment and offered the post of Ambassador to the Dutch Republic, a position he refused. As the political chaos continued into 1660, the military commander in Scotland, General George Monck, marched his troops into England in February and forced Parliament to re-admit those MPs excluded in 1648. Realising Monck intended to restore the monarchy, Rich supported John Lambert's attempt to maintain the Commonwealth by force, but his troops refused to follow him; Sir Richard Ingoldsby was appointed colonel in his stead and he was placed under arrest.

== Restoration ==
Following the May 1660 Stuart Restoration, Rich lost the lands he had acquired in Eltham and High Easter, but was exempted from other legal penalties under the Indemnity and Oblivion Act. Despite this, he was re-arrested on 10 January 1661 during the short-lived rising by his fellow Fifth Monarchist Thomas Venner, and held in Portsmouth. In August 1663, he married Lady Elizabeth Kerr, daughter of the Earl of Ancram and thanks to her lobbying and the support of his custodian, Charles Berkeley, 1st Earl of Falmouth, he was finally set free in 1665. He spent the rest of his life living quietly in Stondon, where he died sometime between drawing up his will in October 1700 and it being proved in March 1702.

== Sources ==
- Farr, David (2020). Major-General Hezekiah Haynes and the Failure of Oliver Cromwell's Godly Revolution, 1594–1704. Taylor & Francis. ISBN 978-1000078831.
- Firth, C.H, ed. (1894). The Memoirs of Edmund Ludlow, 1625-1672. Clarendon Press.
- Firth, C.H, ed. (1891). The Clarke Papers; Selections from the Papers of William Clarke, Volume I. Camden Society.
- Foster, John (1889). The Register of Admissions to Gray's Inn, 1521-1887. Hansard.
- Gentles, Ian (1992). The New Model Army in England, Ireland and Scotland, 1645-1653. Blackwell. ISBN 978-0631158691.
- Gentles, Ian (2004). "Rich, Nathaniel (1701x1702)". Oxford Dictionary of National Biography (online ed.). Oxford University Press. doi:10.1093/ref:odnb/23489. (Subscription, Wikipedia Library access or UK public library membership required.)
- Graham, Aaron (2009). "Finance, Localism and Military Representation in the Army of the Earl of Essex (June-December 1642)". The Historical Journal. 52 (4): 879–898. doi:10.1017/S0018246X09990343. JSTOR 25643862. S2CID 154847523.
- Hamilton, W.D, ed. (1890). Calendar of State Papers Domestic: Charles I, 1644-1645, Volume 503, November to December 1644. HMSO.
- Jones, William R (2010). A History of St Catharine's College, Cambridge. CUP. ISBN 978-1108008969.
- Kelsey, Sean (2004). "Rich, Robert, second earl of Warwick (1587–1658)". Oxford Dictionary of National Biography (online ed.). Oxford University Press. doi:10.1093/ref:odnb/23494. (Subscription, Wikipedia Library access or UK public library membership required.)
- Powell, W.R, ed. (1956). A History of the County of Essex; Volume 4 Ongar Hundred. Victoria County History.
- Reece, Henry (2013). The Army in Cromwellian England, 1649-1660. OUP. ISBN 978-0191746284.
- Roberts, Stephen, ed. (2017). The Cromwell Association Online Directory of Parliamentarian Army Officers; Surnames beginning "R". British History Online.
- Russell, Conrad (2008). "Hampden, John". Oxford Dictionary of National Biography (online ed.). Oxford University Press. doi:10.1093/ref:odnb/12169. (Subscription, Wikipedia Library access or UK public library membership required.)
- Smut, R Malcolm (2004). "Rich, Henry, first earl of Holland (1598-1649)". Oxford Dictionary of National Biography (online ed.). Oxford University Press. doi:10.1093/ref:odnb/23484. (Subscription, Wikipedia Library access or UK public library membership required.)
- Taft, Barbara (1978). ""The Humble Petition of Several Colonels of the Army": Causes, Character, and Results of Military Opposition to Cromwell's Protectorate". Huntington Library Quarterly. 42 (1): 15–41. doi:10.2307/3817408. JSTOR 3817408.
- Webster, Tom (1997). Godly Clergy in Early Stuart England: the Caroline Puritan Movement, C.1620-1643. CUP. ISBN 978-0521521406.
- Worden, Blair (2010). "Oliver Cromwell and the Protectorate". Transactions of the Royal Historical Society. 20: 57–83. doi:10.1017/S0080440110000058. JSTOR 41432386. S2CID 159710210.
