= John Canne =

John Canne (d. 1667?) was an English Independent minister and printer.

== Life ==
The London separatist congregation of John Hubbard, who had moved with them to Ireland around 1621, on Hubbard’s death came back to London and chose Canne as minister. After a year or two he went to Amsterdam, and there became the successor of Henry Ainsworth as pastor of the congregation of English independents there. Canne retained his position for seventeen years, preaching and writing, and working as a printer.

In 1640 Canne visited England, and the Broadmead congregation of baptists having been formed he was called upon to preach to them. He preached both in church and on the green, and debated with Mr. Fowler, the father of Edward Fowler. Canne returned to Amsterdam in the same year. It is supposed that Canne remained at Amsterdam until 1647. In 1650 he was at Kingston-upon-Hull, and acted as chaplain to the governor, Colonel Robert Overton, whose book, Man's Mortalitie, he had printed at Amsterdam in 1643. Canne was in favour with the soldiers as a preacher but he had a rival in John Shawe. Canne's friends obtained a grant for him from the council of state as his chaplain's salary. His stay in Hull was not long, but in 1653, when he published at London A Voice from the Temple to the Higher Powers, he denounced Shawe as 'a most corrupt man and hitherto countenanced by men as corrupt and rotten as himself.' Shawe himself had a low opinion of Canne, at this time credited with the possession of great influence with the council of state.

His daughter, whose name was Deliverance, was buried on 18 December 1656, and his wife, 'Agnees,' was buried on 20 January 1657, at the same place, Holy Trinity Church, Hull. He now appears to have adopted some of the principles of the fifth-monarchy men, a dangerous association, and in 1657 he published at London The Time of the End. Christopher Feake and John Rogers both supplied prefaces. These persons with others were denounced to the government as meeting in London at Mr. Daforme's house in Bartholomew Lane, near the Royal Exchange, and professing themselves ready for insurrection. This was only two months after the crushing of Thomas Venner's attempted rising in the interest of the fifth monarchy.

Canne complains bitterly of his subsequent banishment from Hull. On 2 April 1658, when he was in the pulpit of the meeting-place in Swan Alley, Coleman Street, the marshal of the city entered and arrested him and seven of the brethren who had protested against their rough treatment of the old man. Canne was brought before the lord mayor, and acknowledged that he was not satisfied with the government, and would like an opportunity to tell the Protector so, but declined to enter upon the question with the magistrate. One of the accused, Wentworth Day, was fined and sentenced to twelve months' imprisonment. John Clark, who had been acquitted by the jury was fined and imprisoned for six months. Canne and the remainder were released on 25 April 1658. A narrative of the transaction was published. Canne was resident in August 1659 at his house in London and the date of his final retreat from England is not known. Canne was the object of some satirical writings of Samuel Butler, who published 'The Acts and Monuments of our late Parliament,' 1659, under the pseudonym of John Canne.

He was at Amsterdam in 1664, where he issued again his Bible with Marginal Notes. This is book was later used in the preparation of Samuel Bagster's Comprehensive Bible, of which it is the basis. Canne is believed to have died in Amsterdam in 1667

== Works ==
An allusion to the troubles of the church is found in the title of his first book, The Way to Peace, or Good Counsel for it; preached upon the 15th day of the second month 1632, at the reconciliation of certain brethren between whom there had been former differences, Amsterdam, 1632. His major work, A Necessitie of Separation from the Church of England, appeared two years later. In 1639 Canne published at Amsterdam A Stay against Straying; wherein, in opposition to Mr. John Robinson, is proved the unlawfulness of hearing the Ministers of the Church of England. These two treatises were answered in 1642 by John Ball, who styles Canne 'the leader of the English Brownists in Amsterdam.' Richard Baxter said: 'Till Mr. Ball wrote for the Liturgy and against Can, and Allen, &c., and Mr. Buxton published his "Protestation Protested," I never thought what presbytery or independency were, nor ever spake with a man that seemed to know it. And that was in 1641, when the war was brewing'.

In 1640 he issued his Congregational Discipline. This year appeared also Syon's Prerogative Royal; or a Treatise tending to prove that every particular congregation ... is an independent body. By a Well-wisher of the Truth. This is attributed to Canne by John Paget in his Defence of Presbyterian Government. It has, however, been thought that Ainsworth was the author.

In 1647 his reference Bible with notes appeared, the leading work of its kind that had then appeared. It was dedicated to the English parliament. It has been thought that Canne was the author of three sets of notes on the Bible, and that there was one earlier issue than that of 1647, since he there refers to additions 'to the former notes in the margin,' but no copy appears to be known. In 1653 he had an exclusive license for seven yeare 'to print a Bible with annotations, being his own work, and that no man, unless appointed by him, may print his said notes, either already printed or to be printed'. In the edition of 1664 he speaks of an edition with larger annotations which he proposed to publish, and on which he had spent many years. This does not appear to have been published. In 1649 five of his books were published in London: 1. 'The Improvement of Time.' 2. ' The Golden Rule, or Justice advanced in justification of the legal proceedings of the High Court of Justice against Charles Steward, late king of England.' 3. 'The Snare is Broken. Wherein is proved, by Scripture, Law, and Reason, that the National Covenant and Oath was unlawfully given and taken. Published by authority,' 1649, 4to. The dedication, to the Rt. Hon. the Commons assembled in parliament, is dated from Bowe, 21 April 1649. 4. 'Emanuel, or God with us,' 4to (this is a jubilation over the victory at Dunbar). 5. 'The Discoverer ... the Second Part,' is a vindication of Fairfax and Cromwell, to whom it is jointly dedicated. There is no internal evidence of the authorship, and the terms of a reference to Overton on page 70 argue against its being written by Canne, but it is attributed to him in a pamphlet, 'The Same Hand again,' 1649. The first part is said to have appeared in 1643.

In 1653 after 'A Voice from the Temple to the Higher Powers,' also appeared 'A Second Voice from the Temple to the Higher Powers.' His next work, 'Time with Truth,' is dated from Hull in 1656.

In 1658 he published ' The Time of Finding,' in which he describes himself as 'an old man,' and expecting 'every day to lay down this earthly tabernacle,' and complains of the persecutions he had endured, and to which he attributed the death of his wife and daughter. In 1659 he published 'A Seasonable Word to the Parliament Men,' and 'A Twofold Shaking of the Earth.' A tract upon tithes, entitled 'A Query to William Prynne,' was printed at the end of an ' Indictment against Tythes,' by John Osborn, London, 1659.

== Bibliography ==
- John Canne (Minister of the Ancient English Church in Amsterdam.) (1634). A Necessitie of Separation from the Church of England, prooved by the Nonconformists Principles. Specially opposed vnto Dr Ames, his Fresh Suit against humane ceremonies in the point of separation only. Also Dr Laiton, Mr Dayrel, and Mr Bradshaw are here answered, etc.
- John Canne(Minister of the Ancient English Church in Amsterdam.) (1639). A Stay against Straying. Or an Answer to a Treatise, intituled: The Lawfulnes of hearing the ministers of the Church of England. By John Robinson. Wherein is proved the contrarie, viz: The unlawfulnes of hearing the ministers of all false churches.
- John Canne (1656). Truth with Time: or, Certain Reasons proving that none of the seven last plagues, or vials, are yet poured out ... Likewise, an answer to the said reasons; with a reply. Further, the author hath here set down ... his opinion of the first vial. London: J. C. for Livewel Chapman.
- John Canne (1657). The Time of the End: Shewing, First, Until the Three Years and an Half are Come ... the Prophecies of Scripture Will Not be Understood, Concerning the Duration and Period of the Fourth Monarchy and Kingdom of the Beast. Then, Secondly, when that Time Shall Come ... the Knowledge of the End ... Will be Revealed by the Rise of a Little Horn, the Last Apostacy, and the Beast Slaying the Witnesses; Contemporizing the Characters of which the Little Horn, the Last Apostacy and the Beast ... are Here Faithfully Opened, Etc. London: For Livewel Chapman.
