= Trapnell =

Trapnell is a surname. Notable people with the surname include:

- Anna Trapnell, alleged Prophetess in England in the 1650s
- Barry Trapnell (1924–2012), English first-class cricketer
- Coles Trapnell (1910–1999), American television producer, writer, and director
- Frederick M. Trapnell (1902–1975), United States Navy admiral and aviation pioneer
- Garrett Brock Trapnell (1938–1993), con man, bank robber, and aircraft hijacker of the 1960s and early 1970s
- Thomas J. H. Trapnell (1902–2002), United States Army general
