= Elinor Channel =

Elinor Channel (fl. 1650s) was a purported prophet during the Protectorate in England, Wales and Scotland, and a contemporary of Anna Trapnell.

== Biography ==
Channel lived in Cranleigh, Surrey. She was married and had at least four children. Three of these were considered "very young" at the time she felt called to make prophecies.

In February 1654 she felt called to London to share her prophecies with Oliver Cromwell. Her husband initially refused to let her travel, claiming they could not afford for her to leave her young children to go to London. After she was silent for some time, he agreed to let her go.

Channel arrived in London on 27 April 1654 but was denied an audience with Cromwell as she lacked the financial means to gain access. After two days she went to the City of London to seek a publisher of her prophecies. She was found by Arise Evans who wrote down her prophecy. After this, a woman answering her description was found in Fleet Street in June and taken to Bridewell prison. She was turned away and then abused in the streets. It is not known what happened to Channel afterwards.

Evans published her royalist messages as A Message from God, by a Dumb Woman to His Highness the Lord Protector: Together with a Word of Advice to the Commons of England and Wales, for the Electing of a Parliament as a way of framing his own opinions. Channel's message includes a call for Cromwell to ask Charles II to resume his role as King of England and 'defender of the faith'. The royalist prophet Walter Gostelow seems to allude to Channel in the letter to Oliver Cromwell which prefaces his The Coming of God in Mercy, in Vengeance (1658) when he uses her initials to talk of a royalist pamphlet.
