= Mary Carey =

Mary Carey may refer to:

- Mary Boleyn (c. 1499/1500–1543), married name Mary Carey, sister to Queen Anne and mistress of Henry VIII of England and Francis I of France
- Mary Carey, Lady Carey (c. 1609–c. 1680), née Jackson, English poet and writer
- Mary Carey (baseball) (1925–1977), All-American Girls Professional Baseball League player
- Mary Carey (actress) (born 1980), American former adult film actress, Playboy model, radio host, film director, and politician
- Mary Virginia Carey (1925–1994), English/American writer

Mary Cary may refer to:

- Mary Cary (prophetess) (c. 1621–1663), English prophet and writer during the English Civil War
- Mary Cary Ambler (1732–1781), American diarist
- Mary Ann Shadd (1823–1893), married name Cary, American-Canadian pioneering educator, newspaper publisher, abolitionist, and suffragist
- Mary Flagler Cary (1901–1967), American philanthropist
- Mary Cary, bestselling 1910 novel by Kate Langley Bosher

== See also ==
- Mariah Carey (born 1969), American singer-songwriter, record producer, and actress
