= John Shawe =

English Puritan minister

John Shawe or Shaw (1608–1672) was an English Puritan minister, an influential preacher in the north of England during the Interregnum.

== Life ==
He was the only child of John Shawe (d. December 1634, aged 63) by his second wife, born at Sykehouse in the chapelry of Bradfield, parish of Ecclesfield, West Riding of Yorkshire, on 28 June 1608. His mother was Emot, daughter of Nicholas Stead of Onesacre in the same chapelry. He went to school at Darwen and Rotherham. In 1623 he was admitted pensioner at Christ's College, Cambridge, his tutor being William Chappell. Two sermons by Thomas Weld at a village near Cambridge made him a puritan before he had taken his degree. He graduated B.A. in 1627, then M.A. 1630.

Driven from Cambridge by the plague in 1629, he was ordained deacon and priest (28 Dec.) by Thomas Dove, bishop of Peterborough. His first charge was a lectureship in the chapelry of Brampton, Derbyshire. His diocesan was Thomas Morton, bishop of Coventry and Lichfield, thought him young for a preaching license, and interviewed him with a scholastic examination, but required no subscription and allowed him to preach anywhere. He remained at Brampton three years (1630–3), occasionally visiting London, where his preaching attracted some Devon merchants. Shawe was now married, and held the post of chaplain to Philip Herbert, 4th Earl of Pembroke; through his city connections he was transferred in 1633 to a lectureship to be maintained by for a term of three years at Chulmleigh, Devon. (This arrangement was seen by Shawe himself as parallel to the work of the Feoffees for Impropriations, but was not part of it; it was cut short some time after the Feoffees lost their case to William Laud.)

In 1636 Shaw retired to Sykehouse, of which he had become possessed on his father's death. At the instance of John Vaux, the lord mayor of York, he was soon appointed lecturer at Allhallows-on-the-Pavement, York. Having preached his first sermon there, he was summoned by the archbishop, Richard Neile, who regarded Vaux as his enemy, but moderated his tone on learning that Shawe was Pembroke's chaplain. On 17 April 1639 Shawe was instituted to the vicarage of Rotherham on Pembroke's presentation, and the earl took him to Berwick as his chaplain. At the pacification of Berwick (28 May) Shawe made the acquaintance of Alexander Henderson, and improved it when he acted (October 1640) as chaplain to the English commissioners for the Treaty of Ripon. He acted as chaplain at Doncaster to Henry Rich, 1st Earl of Holland in 1641, when, Holland was engaged in disbanding the army raised against the Scots.

Shawe's ministry at Rotherham was disturbed by the outbreak of the First English Civil War. On Sunday, 22 January 1643, Rotherham was attacked by an armed force, while Shawe was preaching, and he hid in the steeple. He fled to Kingston-upon-Hull, but, having preached there once, he was excluded by the governor Sir John Hotham as an extremist. Subsequently, he preached before Ferdinando Fairfax, 2nd Lord Fairfax of Cameron at Selby. Returning to Rotherham, he was proclaimed a traitor and fined a thousand marks. On the taking of the town (4 May 1643) his wife was imprisoned, but Shawe, after hiding in cellars for three weeks, escaped to Manchester. Here he preached every Friday without pay, He accepted from Sir William Brereton the rectory of Lymm, Cheshire, but continued to reside in Manchester.

On the approach of Prince Rupert (June 1644), Shawe fled to Yorkshire. He was chaplain to the standing committee established after the surrender of York (16 July) for the government of the northern counties, preached in York at the taking of the Solemn League and Covenant (20 September 1644), and was scribe to the assembly of ministers which met weekly in the chapter-house at York to assist Fairfax in the work of expelling scandalous ministers. All the records of this assembly were kept by Shawe, who burned them when national affairs changed. Fairfax gave him the rectory of Scrayingham, East Riding; he preached there only a short time, and accepted a call to Hull, lecturing first at the low church (St. Mary's), then at the high church (Holy Trinity), with a stipend from the corporation, and a house. He lectured on Wednesdays and Sundays, and preached to the garrison. His parishioners petitioned parliament about his gathering a particular church. In 1646 he was at Newcastle-on-Tyne, as chaplain of the parliamentary commissioners to Charles I. In 1651, through the interest of Sir William Strickland, he was appointed master of the Charterhouse at Hull.

During the Protectorate he preached frequently at Whitehall and Hampton Court. Oliver Cromwell admired his preaching, and gave him a salary. He once preached before Richard Cromwell at Whitehall. In the early 1650s he clashed at Hull with John Canne, who denounced him as corrupt in a pamphlet.

When the Restoration came, Shawe was sworn a royal chaplain (25 July 1660). By the end of the year complaints of his services from the officers and garrison of Hull reached Charles II through Gilbert Sheldon. Shawe was present at the coronation (23 April 1661). On 9 June Sir Edward Nicholas despatched a royal mandate (dated 8 June) inhibiting him from preaching at Holy Trinity, Hull. Shawe went up to London and was introduced to the king by Edward Montagu, 2nd Earl of Manchester. Charles declined to remove the inhibition, but allowed him to retain his mastership, and promised to provide for him as his chaplain, Shawe then saw Sheldon, who explained that he was looked upon as a clerical leader in the north, and as no great friend to episcopacy or the Book of Common Prayer. Shawe declared that he had never in his life said a word against either, but owned that 'if they had never come in, he would never have fetched them.' Returning to Hull, he preached every Sunday at the Charterhouse, and drew crowds, in spite of obstructions by the garrison, Finding the situation hopeless, the Uniformity Act 1662 being now passed (19 May 1662), he resigned the Charterhouse, closed his accounts with the corporation who owed him money, and moved on 20 June to Rotherham. Here, till the act came into force (24 August), he conducted services in the parish church alternately with the vicar, Luke Clayton (d. 1674),

Henceforth he preached only in private houses. His means were ample. He died on 19 April 1672, and was buried in Rotherham parish church.

== Works ==
He published, besides sermons, 'Mistris Shawe's Tomb-stone, or the Saint's Remains,' &c. [June] 1668, a memoir of his first wife. His autobiography, written for his son, was edited by John Broadley (from a transcript by Ralph Thoresby) as 'Memoirs of the Life of John Shawe,' &c., Hull, 1824, re-edited for the Surtees Society, 1875; and again re-edited by the Rev. J. R. Boyle, Hull, 1882.

== Family ==
He married, first, on 13 December 1632, Dorothy Heathcote (died 10 December 1657) of Cutthorpe Hall, Derbyshire, by whom he had six daughters, and a son who died in infancy; secondly, on 19 December 1659, Margaret, daughter of John Stillington of Kelfield, by whom he had one daughter, and a son John, born 9 February 1663, died unmarried December 1682.
