= Robert Overton =

Major General Robert Overton
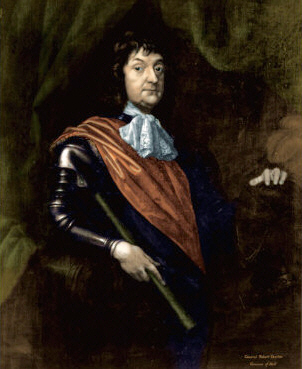
- Portrait of Overton (Unknown artist)

Governor/Deputy Governor of Hull
- In office March 1648 – 1654

Military Commander, West Scotland
- In office December 1652 – February 1653

Personal details
- Born: 1609 Easington, East Riding of Yorkshire
- Died: 1678 (aged 68–69) Seaton, Rutland
- Resting place: New Churchyard, London
- Spouse: Ann Gardiner (1632–1665 her death)
- Relations: Richard Overton (Leveller)
- Children: Twelve, including John (1635–1678), Benjamin (1647–1711), and Anne;
- Education: St John's College, Cambridge; Gray's Inn
- Occupation: Religious and political radical, author and soldier

Military service
- Rank: Major General
- Battles/wars: Wars of the Three Kingdoms; Siege of Hull (1642); Siege of Hull (1643); Marston Moor; Siege of Pontefract Castle; Siege of Sandal Castle; Dunbar; Inverkeithing

Major-General Robert Overton c. 1609 to 1678, was a member of the landed gentry from Yorkshire, who fought for Parliament during the Wars of the Three Kingdoms, and reached the rank of Major General in 1652. A committed republican and religious Independent, he opposed the establishment of The Protectorate, and was held in the Tower of London from 1655 to 1659.

Overton escaped punishment following the May 1660 Stuart Restoration, but was arrested for sedition in December. Apart from a few brief spells of freedom, he was not finally released until 1671, after which he lived with his daughter in Seaton, Rutland, where he died at the end of 1678.

A close friend of John Milton, Overton wrote various articles and pamphlets, as well as poetry. His religious beliefs helped him endure long periods of imprisonment, once noting “There are given to us exceeding great and precious promises; if in patience we possess our spirits, we shall inherit the promises".

== Personal details ==
Robert Overton was born c. 1609 in Easington, East Riding of Yorkshire, eldest son of John Overton (d.1653) and his wife Joanne (1581–1656). He had four brothers and sisters, Germaine (1608–1679), Thomas (b.1610), Griselda (1612–1671), and Anne.

In June 1632, Overton married Anne Gardiner (1616–1665), and they had twelve children, seven of whom were still living when he died in 1678. They included John (1635–1684), Benjamin (1647–1711), Anne, and three other daughters. The Easington estate was passed to John when Robert was imprisoned for the second time, to stop it being sequestered by the crown. Two leases to John dated 1 November 1661 and 7 November 1661, put the estate in lease to John for 99 years, and the ultimate benefit of Ebenezer (Benjamin) and Fairfax, the only other two sons alive at that time. That is why John is not mentioned in his father's will.

The south aisle of All Saints' Church in Easington contains a Lady Chapel. Above the altar is a monument dated 1651 which was placed there by Maj. Gen. Robert Overton in memory of his parents, "the deceased but never to be divided John Overton and his wife Joan".

== Career ==
As positions hardened during the period leading up to the First English Civil War in August 1642, Robert Overton supported the Parliamentarian cause, probably influenced by Sir William Constable, 1st Baronet, who later became a regicide. When the war began, he tried to join the army of Lord Ferdinando Fairfax, but no official positions were available. He was allowed to fight without any definite rank and distinguished himself in the defence of Hull and at the Battle of Marston Moor. In August 1645, the governor of Pontefract, Sir Thomas Fairfax, appointed Overton deputy governor of Pontefract. Shortly after this appointment Overton captured Sandal Castle. Overton was acting governor during the siege of Pontefract Castle; it was reported that he was inconsiderate to Lady Cutler and refused to let Sir Gervaise Cutler be buried in the church.

Having gained a commission in the New Model Army in July 1647, he was given command of the late Colonel Herbert's Regiment of Foot. During the political debates within the New Model Army he appeared as a member of the Army Council sitting on the committee for the duration of the Putney Debates. In March 1648, Fairfax appointed Overton deputy governor of Kingston upon Hull. There he became acquainted with notable puritan and poet Andrew Marvell, but was a very unpopular with the townsfolk. They were known to be sympathetic to the Royalist cause when in June 1648 the town Mayor and some of the town council petitioned for his removal. The sources differ as to his actions during Second English Civil War, but one historian concluded that he spent the war in Hull, while another that he fought with Oliver Cromwell in Wales and the North of England, capturing the Isle of Axholme; that he was also with Cromwell when Charles I was taken to the Isle of Wight.

Overton enthusiastically supported the trial of the King in late 1648 and early 1649, but wrote that he only wanted him deposed and not executed. He disagreed with other points of policy of the early Commonwealth government publishing his position in a pamphlet titled "The declaration of the officers of the garrison of Hull in order to the peace and settlement of the kingdom" and accompanying letter to Thomas Fairfax, in early January. The letter makes it clear that he supported actions like Pride's Purge if the "corrupt Commons" stopped the Army's reforms. Barbara Taft reflected in the last six pages of the declaration the case made in the Remonstrance by the New Model Army to Parliament, the rejection of which had triggered Pride's Purge:

a speedy end to the present parliament; a succession of free biennial parliaments with an equitable distribution of seats; future kings elected by the people's representatives and having no negative voice; a 'universal and mutual Agreement, … enacted and decreed, in perpetuum', that asserts that the power of parliament is 'inferior only to that of the people'|Declaration of the Officers of the Garrison of Hull

As divisions within the New Model Army widened during the Summer of 1649, fear spread that that disunity would be exploited by their enemies, Overton issued a letter that made it clear that he sided with the Rump Parliament and the Grandees against the Levellers. When the Third Civil War broke out in 1650 he accompanied Cromwell to Scotland and commanded a Foot Brigade at the Battle of Dunbar his regiment was also involved in the English Parliamentary victory at the Battle of Inverkeithing (20 July 1651) where Colonel Overton commanded the reserve. When New Model Army returned to England in pursuit of the invading Royalist Scottish army, Overton remained in Scotland as governor of Edinburgh. He helped complete the subjugation of Scotland and commanded an expedition to reduce the garrison forces on Orkney. On 14 May 1652, a grateful Parliament voted Scottish lands to him with an annual income of 400 pounds sterling per year. In December 1652, when George Monck's successor Richard Deane was recalled, the General appointed him as Military Commander over all English forces in the Western Highlands with the governorship of Aberdeen, the senior rank of Major-General.

On his father's death in 1653, he returned to England inheriting the family estates in Easington as eldest son and heir. At the same time he resumed duties as Governor of Hull. During 1650, he and his wife had become members of the "church": in retrospect he considered the execution of Charles I as a fulfilment of the fundamentals of Old Testament scripture so often cited in Ezekiel 21:26-27:

"Thus saith the Lord GOD; Remove the diadem, and take off the crown: this shall not be the same: exalt him that is low, and abase him that is high. I will overturn, overturn, overturn, it: and it shall be no more, until he come whose right it is; and I will give it him."Ezekiel 21:26-27

concerning the humble and the meek, exorcised by God in "overturning" the established order. Overton wrote: "the Lord...is forced to shake and shake and overturn and overturn; this is a shaking, overturning dispensation." Some sources promoted the belief he was a Fifth Monarchist, but his views seemed to have spanned several of the religious beliefs and political grouping of the day and it is difficult to label him as belonging to any one group.

He hailed Cromwell's dissolution of the Rump Parliament in June 1653, yet subsequently became disenchanted, suspicious of Cromwell as more dictator than Lord Protector. Although his letters to Cromwell remained cordial, during the early years of the Protectorate he seems to have become more inclined to distance himself from the Lord Protector, advising a diminution with the speed of reform. Cromwell informed him that he could keep his position in the army so long as he promised to relinquish his office when he could no longer support the policies of the Protectorate. In September 1654, he returned to his command in Scotland, a conveniently long distance from GHQ in London. There he planned a coup d'état; in December 1654, Overton was arrested and imprisoned in the Tower for his part in the self-styled "Overton Revolt". It was alleged that a verse in Overton's handwriting was found amongst his papers:

A Protector! What's that? Tis a stately thing
That confesseth itself the ape of a King;
A tragical Caesar acted by a crown,
Or a brass farthing stamped with a kind of crown;
A bauble that shines, a loud cry without wool,
Not Perillus nor Phalaris, but the bull;
The echo of Monarchy till it come,
The butt-end of a barrel in the shape of a drum;
A counterfeit piece that woodenly shows,
A golden effigies with a copper nose;
The fantastic shadow of a sovereign head,
The arms-royal reversed, and disloyal instead;
In fine, he is one we may Protector call,
From whom the King of Kings protect us all!"

He was accused of planning a military insurrection against the government and plotting to assassinate Monck. It is not clear how involved he was in the plot, but he was good friends with Monck at the time, so it was unlikely he was involved. But whatever his real position he was considered too lenient with his "disaffected officers" in sanctioning their meetings and there was evidence that he held meetings with John Wildman, an incorrigible Leveller plotter, prepared to use anyone to bring down the government. Later while in the Tower of London, he wrote to others informing them of Wildman's plans. At the time a fellow prisoner wrote of Overton, "He was a great independent, civil and decent, a scholar, but a little pedantic."In 1655 Cromwell was convinced enough of his guilt to have him removed from the governorship of Hull and to confiscate the lands granted to him by Parliament in Scotland handing them back to Earl of Leven the owner before they were sequestrated.

Overton remained incarcerated in the Tower until March 1658 when he was moved to Elizabeth Castle on the island of Jersey. Barbara Taft mentions that "It is not unlikely that respect for Overton's ability and fear of his appeal as an opposition leader played a major role in his imprisonment." After Cromwell's death and the re-installation of the Commonwealth, Grizelle, his sister, his wife Anne, her brother, and many Republicans, presented his case to Parliament, on 3 February 1659, along with letters from Overton's close friend John Milton. Overton and John Milton probably became acquainted from an early moment in their careers in St Giles, Cripplegate, where they removed and lived for a time. Milton considered Overton a scholar and celebrated him and his exploits in his Defensio Secunda by writing:

"...bound to me these many years past in friendship of more than brotherly closeness and affection, both by the similarity of our tastes and the sweetness of your manners."

Milton also included Overton in his list of "twelve apostles of revolutionary integrity."

After hearing his case on 16 March 1659, Parliament ordered Overton's release pronouncing his imprisonment illegal. Overton's return was called "his greatest political triumph; a huge crowd, bearing laurel branches, acclaimed him and diverted his coach from its planned path." In June 1659 he was restored to a command and further compensated for his losses. Charles II wrote him promising forgiveness for past disloyalty and rewarded him for services in effecting the restoration. Overton was appointed governor of Hull and again was unpopular, many referring to him as "Governor Overturn," because of his association with the Fifth Monarchists who used the phrase liberally. This perception was reinforced by the sermons of John Canne, a well known Fifth Monarchist preacher in Overton's regiment at Hull. On 12 October 1659 he was one of seven major-generals in whom Parliament vested the government of the army until January 1660.

By early 1660, Overton's position started to diverge from that of Monck, as he did not support the return of Charles II, yet he and his officers refused to aid Generals Lambert and Fleetwood. Seeking to mediate published an exhortation to them to maintain the Lord's cause, entitled "The Humble Healing Advice of R.O." The ambiguity implicit by his of conduct described in letters to troops stationed in Yorkshire caused Monck much embarrassment. As a result, Monck requested Lord Thomas Fairfax order him to take any order he gave. On 4 March 1660, a day after Lambert's arrest, Monck ordered Overton to surrender his command to Fairfax and come to London. Overton planned a stand, but he must have seen that defeat would have been inevitable. Hull's disaffection for him and some division among the garrison caused him to allow himself to be replaced by Thomas Fairfax's son, Charles Fairfax. The Garrison in Hull began the English Civil War as the first town to resist Charles I and was among the last to accept his son Charles II. After 1642 no monarch would set foot in Hull for over 200 years.

Overton was an independent and a republican. He was regarded, perhaps falsely, as one of the Fifth Monarchists, and at the first rumour of insurrection was arrested and sent to the Tower of London in December 1660, where Samuel Pepys went to see him writing in his diary that Overton had been found with a large quantity of arms. Pepys recorded that Overton had told him that the arms were brought to London to sell.

Overton was briefly at liberty in the Autumn of 1661. Realising that he might be re-arrested at any moment, he spent time arranging his financial and personal affairs. He issued a series of deeds to make provision for his mother, his wife and family and to avoid confiscation of his property by the Crown. Most of his properties were sold to his family, to his sons Ebenezer and Fairfax and his daughter Joanna, and close friends. The last documents were executed on 7 November 1661 and on 9 November 1661 he was sent to Chepstow Castle. He managed a short interval of freedom but was again arrested on 26 May 1663 on "suspicion of seditious practices and for refusing to sign the oaths or give security." As Andrew Marvell, the English Satirist, wrote in a letter to John Milton,

"Col. Overton [was] one of those steady Republicans whom Cromwell was unable to conciliate and was under the necessity of security."

In 1664 the government sent him to Jersey, the second time he had been imprisoned there and this time it was to be for seven years. During this time he was allowed out and about on the island which was not uncommon for high-ranking political prisoners. Overton spent the years of his incarceration in Mont Orgueil Castle trying to establish his freedom. In a 370-page manuscript of letters, meditations and poetry to his beloved wife's memory and about religious subjects was the manuscript "Gospell Observations & Religious Manifestations &c.", He remained a prisoner on Jersey until early December 1671 when he was released to his brother-in-law by a warrant signed by Charles II. He returned to England and lived his last years with or near his daughters and probably two sons in Rutland.

Overton's will is dated 23 June 1678, aged 69. The parish register records that he was buried on 2 July 1678 in the churchyard of All Hallows Church, Seaton, Rutland but Barbra Taft writes that he was buried in the New Churchyard, Moorfields, London.

== Sources ==
- Taft, Barbara (2004). "Overton, Robert (1608–1678)". Oxford Dictionary of National Biography (online ed.). Oxford University Press. doi:10.1093/ref:odnb/20795. (Subscription, Wikipedia Library access or UK public library membership required.)
- John Rees, 'Lieutenant-Colonel John Rede: West Country Leveller and Baptist pioneer', The Seventeenth Century 30.3 (2015): 317–337.
