= Mary Cary (prophetess) =

Pamphleteer during the English Civil War

Mary Cary Rand
- Mary Cary
- Born: c. 1621
- Died: 1653 (aged 31–32)
- Citizenship: Kingdom of England
- Occupations: Writer; Prophetess; Pamphleteer
- Writing career
- Pen name: M.C.
- Language: English
- Subject: Fifth Monarchists

Mary Cary Rand (or Rande; c. 1621 – 1653) was an English writer, prophetess and pamphleteer supporting the Fifth Monarchists during the English Civil War.

== Work ==
During the English Civil War, Cary lived in London. A Presbyterian, she became a Fifth Monarchist and started prophesying and writing about church reform, equality for women, and poverty. She was a follower of Thomas Brightman and Henry Archer. She believed the New Model Army was a sign of the arrival of the Two witnesses and that Charles I was the little horn found in Daniel 7. She believed Charles I's death to be the sign of the impending return of Christ. Her prophecies focused around Parliamentarian victory, believing it would result in the building of God's kingdom on earth in 1701. This would be summarized in her first pamphlet, The Resurrection of the Two Witnesses in 1648.

Her major works, The Little Horns Doom and Downfall and A New and Exact Mappe or Description of New Jerusalems Glory, were released in 1651. Hugh Peters and Christopher Feake wrote introductions to the books. The books were dedicated to Elizabeth Cromwell, Bridget Ireton and Margaret Rolle. In her many additional works, she expressed interest in Parliament providing more support to the poor, including ending tithing, and universities providing scholarships to fund impoverished preachers and scholars.

Her last work, published in 1653, was The Resurrection of the Witnesses and England's Fall. The work stated that Christianity would spread across Europe in the wake of England losing the Anglo-Dutch Wars.

Until 1651, she wrote as "M.C.", before which her gender was unknown to her readers.

Some of her work, especially The Little Horn's Doom and Downfall, is anagogical interpretation, a form of theological exegesis.

== Personal life ==
Little is known of Cary's personal life. She is believed to have started developing her theories and prophecies in the wake of studying the Bible starting at the age of 15. She was born Mary Cary around 1621 and died in 1653. She was married to a man with the surname "Rand" or "Rande."

== Works ==
- A Word in Season to the Kingdom of England (1647)
- The Resurrection of the Witness (1648)
- England's Fall from The Mystical Babylon—Rome (1648)
- The Little Horn's Doom and Downfall (1651)
- A New and More Exact Mappe or Description of New Jerusalem's Glory, When Jesus Christ and His Saints with Him Shall Reign on Earth a Thousand Years, and Possess all Kingdoms (1651)
- Twelve New Proposals to the Supreme Governours of the Three Nations now assembled at Westminster (1653).
- The Resurrection of the Witnesses and England's Fall (1653)
