= Thomas Harrison (soldier) =

English lawyer and military officer (1616–1660)

Major-General Thomas Harrison
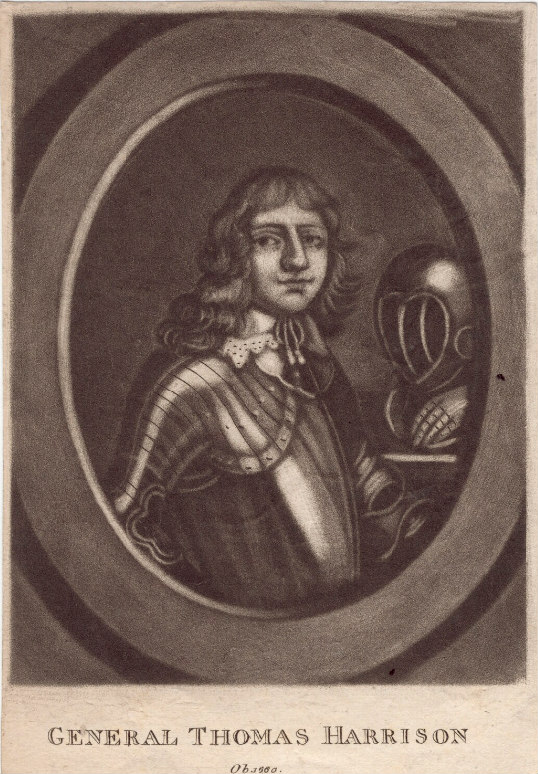

Nominated to Barebone's Parliament
- In office February 1653 – December 1653

Member of Parliament for Wendover
- In office May 1646 – April 1653

Personal details
- Born: 1616 Newcastle-under-Lyme
- Died: 13 October 1660 (aged 44) Tyburn
- Cause of death: Executed
- Spouse: Catherine Harrison (1646–his death)
- Children: 3 died as infants
- Occupation: Law clerk

Military service
- Allegiance: Parliamentarians
- Rank: Major general
- Battles/wars: Wars of the Three Kingdoms; Battle of Powick Bridge; Battle of Edgehill; Battle of Marston Moor; Battle of Naseby; Battle of Langport; Siege of Basing House; Siege of Oxford; Battle of Knutsford; Battle of Worcester

Major-General Thomas Harrison (1616 - 13 October 1660) was an English lawyer and military officer who fought for Parliamentarians and Commonwealth of England in the Wars of the Three Kingdoms. He was also a prominent member of the radical religious sect known as the Fifth Monarchists. One of the regicides who approved the execution of Charles I in January 1649, Harrison was a strong supporter of Oliver Cromwell before the two fell out when The Protectorate was established in 1653. Following the 1660 Stuart Restoration, he was arrested, found guilty of treason as a regicide, and sentenced to death. Harrison was hanged, drawn and quartered on 13 October 1660, facing his execution with a courage noted by various observers, including the diarist Samuel Pepys.

== Personal details ==
Thomas Harrison was baptised 16 July 1616, second of four children and only son of Richard Harrison, four times mayor of Newcastle-under-Lyme, and his wife Mary. In 1646, he married his cousin Catherine Harrison; they had three children, all of whom died as infants.

== Career ==
Harrison was probably educated at a local Grammar school before moving to London, where he became clerk to a lawyer based in Clifford's Inn. When the First English Civil War began in August 1642, the Earl of Essex was appointed commander of the Parliamentarian army, and Harrison enlisted in his personal troop of Lifeguards, which was recruited almost exclusively from the Inns of Court. Other members included Charles Fleetwood, Edmund Ludlow and Nathaniel Rich, all of whom played important roles in the political and religious conflicts that followed. This unit fought in two of the earliest battles of the war, Powick Bridge in September and Edgehill in October 1642.

In summer 1643, he transferred to the army of the Eastern Association as captain of a cavalry troop in the Earl of Manchester's regiment. He had reached the rank of lieutenant-colonel by the time it took part in the decisive Battle of Marston Moor in July 1644.

He fought in many of the major battles of the war and joined the New Model Army in 1645. By the end of the conflict he had risen to the rank of major-general and was a noted friend and supporter of Oliver Cromwell.

He was elected to the Long Parliament for Wendover in 1646. His regiment maintained strong Leveller sympathies, mutinying in 1647.

== Second English Civil War ==
When conflict resumed he was wounded at Appleby in July 1648. He had to return to London but was well enough to command the escort that brought the King to London in January 1649. Harrison sat as a commissioner (judge) at the trial and was the seventeenth of fifty-nine commissioners to sign the death warrant of King Charles I.

In 1650, Harrison was appointed to a military command in Wales where he was apparently extremely severe. He was promoted to the rank of Major-General in 1651 and commanded the army in England during Cromwell's Scottish expedition. He fought at the battle of Knutsford in August and at Worcester in September 1651.

By the early 1650s Harrison was associated with the radical Fifth Monarchists and became one of their key speakers. He still supported Cromwell and aided in the dissolution of the Rump Parliament in April 1653. He opposed the parliament on the basis that it was blocking more stringent religious reforms – he wanted a more "godly" parliament. Harrison was a radical member of the Nominated Assembly (Barebones Parliament) that replaced Parliament. When the assembly was dissolved, Harrison and others refused to leave and had to be forced out by soldiers. Harrison was dismissed from the Army in December.

Like many, he was outraged by the formation of the Protectorate and the elevation of Cromwell to Lord Protector. Under the Protectorate (1653–60) Harrison was imprisoned four times.

== Arrest and trial ==
Sign outside the Hung, Drawn and Quartered pub in Tower Hill, London

After Cromwell's death Harrison remained quietly in his home, supporting none of the contenders for power. Following the Stuart Restoration, Harrison declined to flee and was arrested in May 1660.

He was tried on 11 October 1660. Edmond Ludlow described the trial in his memoirs,

...(Harrison) not only pleaded not guilty, but justified the sentence passed upon the King (Charles I), and the authority of those who had commissioned him to act as one of his judges. He plainly told them, when witnesses were produced against him, that he came not thither with an intention to deny anything he had done, but rather to bring it to light, owning his name subscribed to the warrant for executing the King, to be written by himself; charging divers of those who sat on the Bench, as his judges, to have been formerly as active for the cause, in which he had engaged, as himself or any other person; affirming that he had not acted by any other motive than the principles of conscience and justice; for proof of which he said it was well known, he had chosen to be separated from his family, and to suffer a long imprisonment rather than to comply with those who had abused the power they had assumed to the oppression of the people. He insisted that having done nothing, in relation to the matter in question, otherwise than by the authority of the Long Parliament, he was not justly accountable to this or any other inferior Court; which being a point of law, he desired to have council assigned upon that head; but the Court over-ruled; and by interrupting him frequently, and not permitting him to go on in this defense, they clearly manifested a resolution of gratifying the resentments of the Court upon any terms. So that a hasty verdict was brought in against him, and the question being asked, if he had anything to say, why judgement should not pass, he only said, that since the Court had refused to hear what was fit for him to speak in his defense, he had no more to say; upon which Bridgeman pronounced the sentence. And that the inhumanity of these men may the better appear, I (Edmond Ludlow) must not omit, that the executioner in an ugly dress, with a halter in his hand, was placed near the Major-General, and continued there during the whole time of his trial, which action I doubt whether it was ever equaled by the most barbarous nations. But having learned to condemn such baseness, after the sentence had been pronounced against him, he (Major-General Harrison) said aloud as he was withdrawn from the Court, that he had no reason to be ashamed of the cause in which he had been engaged.

Harrison's sentence was "That you be led to the place from whence you came, and from thence be drawn upon a hurdle to the place of execution, and then you shall be hanged by the neck and, being alive, shall be cut down, and your privy members to be cut off, and your entrails be taken out of your body and, you living, the same to be burnt before your eyes, and your head to be cut off, your body to be divided into four-quarters, and head and quarters to be disposed of at the pleasure of the King's majesty. And the Lord have mercy on your soul."

== Execution ==
Major-General Harrison was the first of the regicides to be executed by being hanged, drawn and quartered on 13 October 1660. Harrison, after being hanged for several minutes and then cut open, was reported to have leaned across and hit his executioner—resulting in the swift removal of his head. His entrails were thrown onto a nearby fire. His head adorned the sledge that drew fellow regicide John Cook to his execution, before being displayed in Westminster Hall; his quarters were fastened to the city gates.

Samuel Pepys wrote an eyewitness account of the execution at Charing Cross, in which Major General Harrison was drily reported to be "looking as cheerful as any man could do in that condition". This account is also quoted on a plaque on the wall of the Hung, Drawn and Quartered public house near Pepys Street, where the diarist lived and worked in the Navy Office. In his final moments, as he was being led up the scaffold, the hangman asked for his forgiveness. Upon hearing his request, Thomas Harrison replied, "I do forgive thee with all my heart... Alas poor man, thou doith it ignorantly, the Lord grant that this sin may be not laid to thy charge." Thomas Harrison then gave all of the money that remained in his pockets to his executioner and was thereafter executed.

Edmond Ludlow also provided an account of the execution at Charing Cross:

The sentence which had been pronounced in consequence of the verdict was executed upon Major-General Harrison at the place where Charing Cross formerly stood, that the King might have the pleasure of the spectacle, and inure himself to blood." According to Ludlow, "On the fifteenth (15 October 1660), Mr. John Carew suffered there also, even their enemies confessing that more steadiness of mind, more contempt of death, and more magnanimity could not be expressed. To all who were present with them either in prison or at the place where the sentence was executed, they owned that having engaged in the cause of God and their country, they were not at all ashamed to suffer in the manner their enemies thought fit, openly avowing the inward satisfaction of their minds when they reflected upon the actions for which they had been condemned, not doubting the revival of the same cause; and that a time should come when men would have better thoughts of their persons and proceedings."

In his book The Better Angels of Our Nature, Steven Pinker wrote about the execution:

Even when they were not actively enjoying torture, people showed a chilling insouciance to it. Samuel Pepys, presumably one of the more refined men of his day, made the following entry in his diary for October 13, 1660: Out to Charing Cross, to see Major-general Harrison hanged, drawn, and quartered; which was done there, he looking as cheerful as any man could do in that condition. He was presently cut down, and his head and heart shown to the people, at which there was great shouts of joy. … From thence to my Lord's, and took Captain Cuttance and Mr. Sheply to the Sun Tavern, and did give them some oysters. Pepys's cold joke about Harrison's "looking as cheerful as any man could do in that condition" referred to his being partly strangled, disemboweled, castrated, and shown his organs being burned before being decapitated.

== Sources ==
- Abbott, Geoffrey (2005) [1994]. Execution, a Guide to the Ultimate Penalty. Summersdale Publishers. ISBN 978-1-84024-433-5.
- Gentles, Ian (2004). "Harrison, Thomas (bap. 1616, d. 1660)". Oxford Dictionary of National Biography (online ed.). Oxford University Press. doi:10.1093/ref:odnb/12448. (Subscription, Wikipedia Library access or UK public library membership required.)
- Graham, Aaron (2009). "Finance, Localism and Military Representation in the Army of the Earl of Essex (June-December 1642)". The Historical Journal. 52 (4): 879–898. doi:10.1017/S0018246X09990343. JSTOR 25643862. S2CID 154847523.
