= Earl of Manchester's Regiment =

Parliamentarian unit in the English Civil War

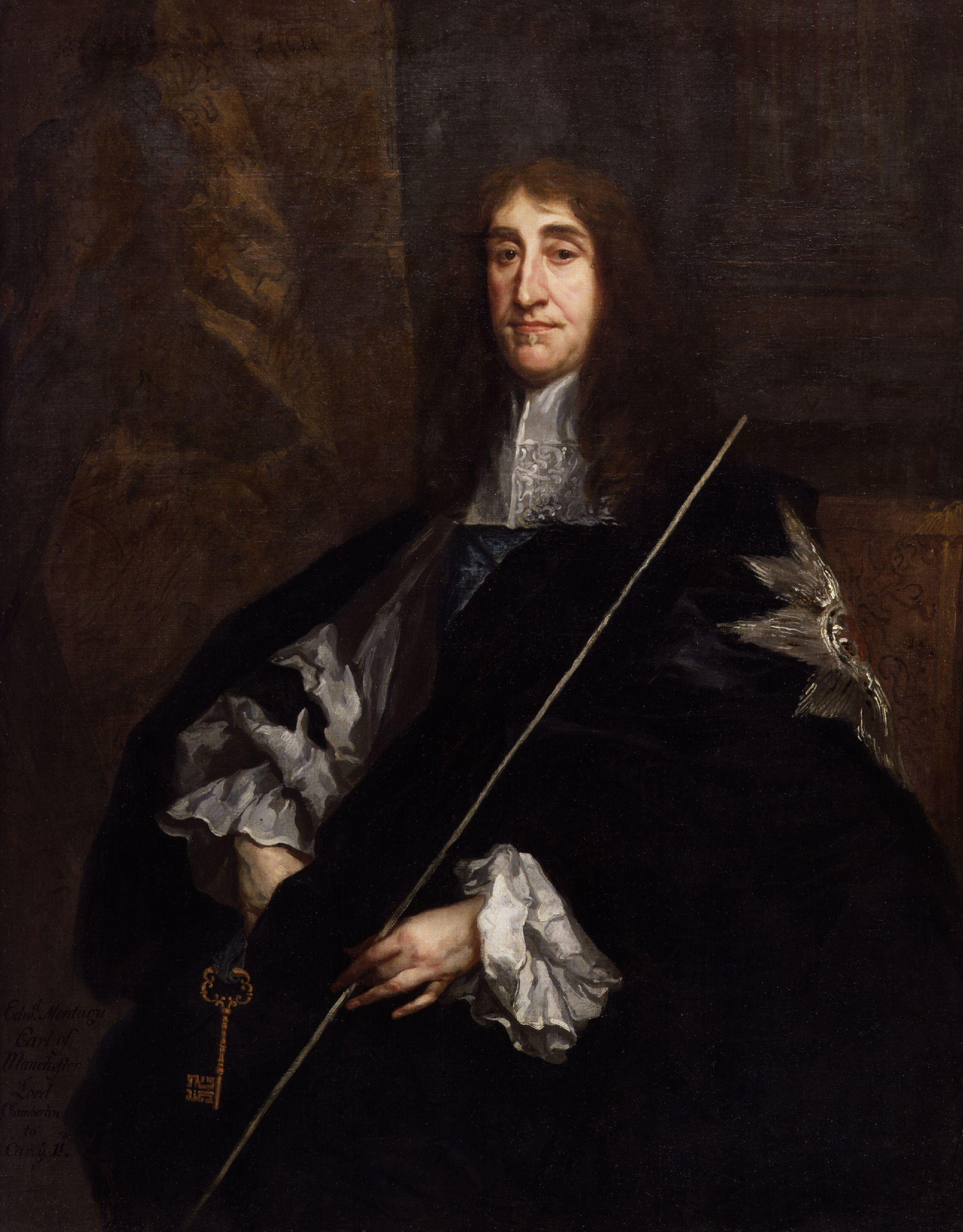
- The Earl of Manchester
- Active: 1642–1645
- Disbanded: 1645
- Country: Kingdom of England
- Allegiance: Parliamentarian
- Type: Regiment
- Part of: Eastern Association, later absorbed into the New Model Army
- Engagements: English Civil War; Battle of Marston Moor

Commanders
- Notable commanders: Edward Montagu, 2nd Earl of Manchester, Algernon Sidney

The Earl of Manchester's Regiment was a Parliamentarian infantry regiment formed during the English Civil War.

It was formed by Edward Montagu, 2nd Earl of Manchester, who at the beginning of the Long Parliament was a leader of the Parliamentarians in the House of Lords and whose failure to be impeached by the king in 1642 along with the Five Members was a key point in the outbreak of the Civil War. At the outbreak of the Civil War the regiment was formed and put in the army of Robert Devereux, 3rd Earl of Essex.

In the summer of 1643 due to internal disagreements in the parliamentary forces in east a local MP Oliver Cromwell asked parliament to appoint a commander with authority and in August 1643 Parliament made Manchester Major-General of the Eastern Association in the place of Lord William Grey. This brought him into close contact with Oliver Cromwell his Lieutenant General in the Eastern Association, who himself commanded a new regiment.

In 1644 Manchester was a senior commander at the Battle of Marston Moor but in the subsequent operations his lack of energy brought him into disagreement with Cromwell who brought the shortcomings of Manchester before Parliament in the autumn of 1644. In April 1645, anticipating the Self-denying Ordinance, Manchester resigned his command.

When the New Model Army was formed, the regiment was commanded by Nathaniel Rich after the previous colonel Algernon Sidney declined the appointment due to ill health. Rich had earlier been rejected by the Commons for a colonelcy.

The Earl of Manchester's Regiment of Foote is a modern day re-enactment society that is part of the Sealed Knot Civil War re-enactment group.
