= Fifth Monarchists =

English radical religious group, 1649–1660

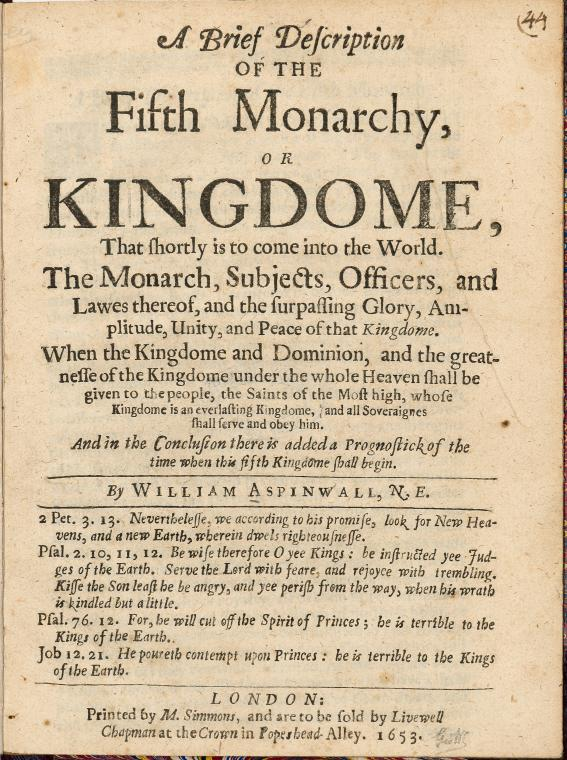
Title page of A Brief description of the Fifth Monarchy or Kingdome (1653) by William Aspinwall.

The Fifth Monarchists, or Fifth Monarchy Men, were a Protestant sect with millennialist views active between 1649 and 1660 in the Commonwealth of England. The group took its name from a prophecy that claimed the four kingdoms of Daniel would precede the fifth, which would see the establishment of the kingship and kingdom of God on Earth.

One of a number of Nonconformist sects that emerged during the Wars of the Three Kingdoms, its best-known adherent was Major-General Thomas Harrison, who was executed in October 1660 as a regicide. Oliver Cromwell was a sympathiser until 1653, when many Fifth Monarchists opposed his creation of the Protectorate.

Members believed the execution of Charles I in January 1649 marked the end of the Fourth Monarchy and viewed the Protectorate and 1660 Stuart Restoration as preventing the coming of the Fifth. Since some believed this justified military action, they were persecuted by both regimes and never became a mass movement. Many of their remaining leaders were executed after Thomas Venner's rising in January 1661, and the group dissolved.

Along with millenarianism and antinomianism, Fifth Monarchists shared many of their views with other Nonconformists. However, they were primarily united by shared political beliefs rather than being a religious group with a distinctive and coherent doctrine. The links this created between different factions gave them influence disproportionate to their numbers.

== Beliefs ==
The Fifth Monarchists took their inspiration from the four kingdoms of Daniel. This prophesied that the Fifth Monarchy, or Kingdom of God, would be preceded by the Babylonian, Persian, Greek and Roman kingdoms. Followers believed the execution of Charles I in January 1649 marked the end of the Fourth or Roman Monarchy. Several became regicides in the belief his death would usher in the Kingdom of the Saints, or rule by those who were "saved", such as the Fifth Monarchists. The role of these so-called "Saints" was to prepare the masses for the Second Coming, although exactly when this would happen was debated. Based on the Book of Revelation, some believed Christ would return in 1666, which corresponded with the biblical number of the beast, while it was also common to refer to a "Thousand Years".

Many supported "Antinomianism", a rejection of the legal system on the grounds that the "Saved" were not bound by the Ten Commandments, while they also believed it was their duty to resist any regime which hindered the coming of the Kingdom. Although the movement eventually split between those who opposed violence, the "suffering Saints", and the "insurrectionist Saints" like Thomas Venner who advocated taking up arms, these beliefs caused Oliver Cromwell and later contemporaries to see them as wild revolutionaries and enemies of the established order.

== Origins and the Commonwealth ==
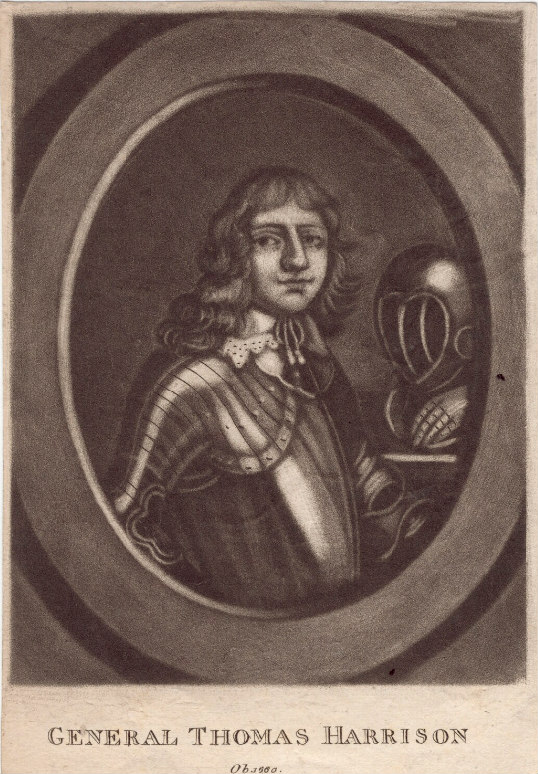
Major-General Thomas Harrison, Fifth Monarchist leader executed as a regicide in 1660

The outbreak of the Wars of the Three Kingdoms in 1639 led to an exponential increase in the dissemination of radical political and religious views, including Millennialist ideas. (Note: In part due to the lifting of strict censorship laws.) Although Millenarianism was common among Puritans and even shared by some Royalist members of the Church of England, Fifth Monarchists were unique in that the concept was central to their theology. However, one recent historian argues it is more accurate to see them as a political group, rather than a religious sect with a distinctive and coherent doctrine.

In general, Fifth Monarchists also opposed Religious tolerance for non-Protestants, and unlike groups such as the Diggers had no desire to end the existing social order or extend political rights, since they argued only the "Saved" were worthy of power. Exceptions included the Levellers sympathiser Christopher Feake, and Mary Cary, who supported gender equality and measures to alleviate poverty; prior to her death in 1654, she wrote under the name "MC", and many assumed she was a man.

The Fifth Monarchists began life as a faction of the religious Independents who dominated the post-1648 Rump Parliament, with close links to Anabaptists. Their emergence as a separate sect is usually dated to December 1651, when a group of preachers including Feake, John Rogers, and John Simpson met in London. Disillusioned by the apparent failure of Parliament to further the "Godly Revolution", they agreed a programme of action to support their objectives, including active resistance to the Commonwealth government.

Primarily recruited from the London artisan class, the Fifth Monarchists attracted attention disproportionate to their actual numbers because these included senior officers of the New Model Army. Among them were Major Generals Thomas Harrison and Robert Overton, along with Colonels Nathaniel Rich, John Jones Maesygarnedd and William Goffe, as well as senior administrators such as John Carew. Many others were initially sympathetic to their views, including Cromwell and Sir Henry Vane, and the highpoint of their political influence came in April 1653 when Cromwell dismissed the Rump Parliament, an action which led the Fifth Monarchists to hail him as a new Moses.

They also supported his declaration of war on the Dutch Republic. Despite it being waged against fellow Protestants, the Monarchists argued that it was their duty to spread the Kingdom of the Saints to every country, whether Protestant or Catholic. (Note: As stated in their 1654 manifesto; "In this present Age, the Lord JEHOVAH is setting up the fifth Kingdom, which shall not be left to other people, but shall break in pieces all the four kingdoms, and remain for ever and ever; and that (at this time) when as the fourth Monarchy is partly broken in these Nations, that Christ may be the only Potentate, the King of kings, and of all Nations."). Cromwell replaced the Rump with a nominated body popularly known as "Barebone's Parliament"; out of 149 MPs, 15 can be identified as Fifth Monarchists, including Praise-God Barebone, Carew and Harrison. The inaugural session began in July 1653 but the different factions quickly became entangled in bitter disputes over tithes, which the Monarchists wanted to abolish rather than reduce, and reform of the legal system, which they argued should be based solely on laws contained in the Bible. On 8 December, the moderate majority passed a motion urging Cromwell to dissolve Parliament, leading to the establishment of the Protectorate on 16th.

The result was open conflict between the regime and the Fifth Monarchists; Harrison, Overton and Rich were dismissed from the army, while Rogers and Feake attacked Cromwell for his Apostasy and preached revolt to their followers. This caused a split with elements of the movement like John Carew who held Anabaptist views, notably their opposition to the use of violence. Rogers and Feake were arrested, while the government placed other members under surveillance and thereafter alternated persecution with tolerance in an attempt to split the movement. This policy had some success, with Rogers, Goffe, John Jones Maesygarnedd and the Welsh preacher Morgan Llwyd becoming reconciled with the regime, leaving a minority of insurrectionists like Venner who was imprisoned in 1657 for planning a rising. By the time he was released in 1659, the Monarchists had lost much of their influence and were no longer a significant force.

== Restoration and after ==
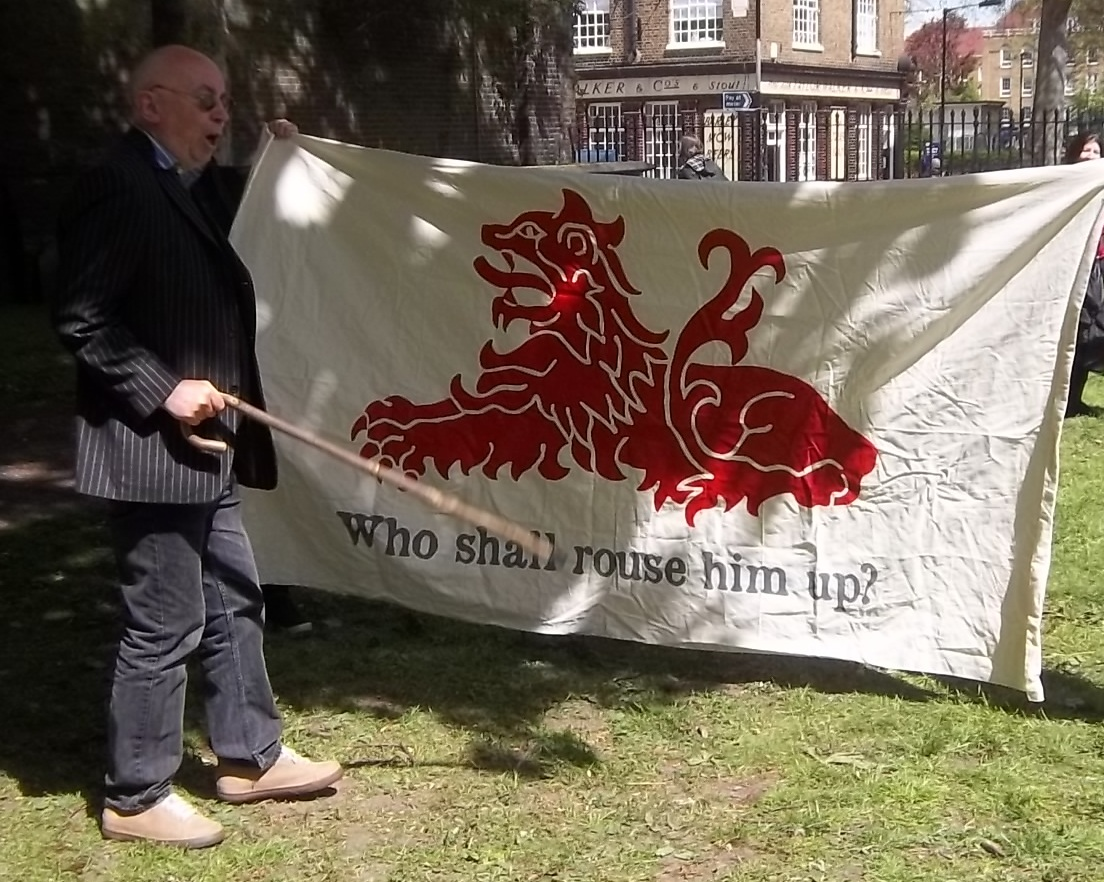
Ian Bone speaking at the installation of the Thomas Rainsborough memorial plaque (12 May 2013), championing Thomas Venner and the Fifth Monarchy Men. The banner is a replica of that used by the insurgents at the time.

Following the Stuart Restoration in May 1660, Harrison was the first person to be found guilty of regicide and then hanged, drawn and quartered on 13 October. One reason was his justification of violent action against "un-Godly rulers", which meant he was viewed as an ongoing threat to the re-established order. This seemed confirmed on 6 January 1661, when Venner tried to incite a popular uprising to capture London in the name of "King Jesus", with fifty followers based in Norton Folgate.

Most were killed or taken prisoner, with Venner and ten others executed for high treason on 19 and 21 January, while its failure led to the suppression of Non-conformist sects, culminating in the Act of Uniformity 1662. Although the Great Plague of London and the Great Fire of London briefly revived belief in the end of a world ruled by carnal human beings, Fifth Monarchy ceased to exist as a separate sect, although some doctrines were absorbed by Baptists and others who believed "God's Kingdom" could be achieved through spiritual means.

== Notable members and sympathisers ==
- Praise-God Barebone; gave his name to the 1653 Barebone's Parliament, arrested after the 1660 Restoration but later released and died in 1679;
- John Carew; executed as a regicide in 1661;
- Mary Cary (prophetess); died c. 1654;
- Christopher Feake; a Fifth Monarchist who shared the egalitarian political views of the Levellers, he was arrested in 1655 under the Protectorate. Released after Cromwell's death in 1658, he disappears from the historical record after 1660;
- Major General William Goffe; regicide, fled to New England in 1660, where he is thought to have died around 1679;
- Major-General Thomas Harrison; dismissed from the army in 1654 and imprisoned several times under the Protectorate, he was executed as a regicide in October 1660;
- Morgan Llwyd; leader of the Welsh Fifth Monarchists and Welsh language author, died 1659;
- John Jones Maesygarnedd; served in the Parliamentarian army in Wales during the First and Second English Civil Wars, continued to hold office under the Protectorate, executed as a regicide in October 1660;
- Major-General Robert Overton; arrested several times during the Protectorate, imprisoned on the island of Jersey from 1661 to 1668, died at home in London 1679;
- Major General William Packer; imprisoned briefly after the Restoration, died 1662;
- Vavasor Powell; Welsh preacher, imprisoned by both the Protectorate and the Stuart regime, died in prison 1670;
- Colonel Thomas Rainsborough; often cited as a Fifth Monarchist, he was the leading Leveller spokesman during the 1647 Putney Debates, shared Anabaptist sympathies and died in 1648
- Colonel Nathaniel Rich; dismissed from the army along with Harrison and Overton, he was imprisoned under the Protectorate in 1655, then released in 1656. Since he was not a regicide, he escaped punishment after the Restoration, but was arrested during the Venner Rising and held until 1665, after which he lived quietly at home in Essex;
- John Rogers; preacher, imprisoned under the Protectorate, went into exile in the Dutch Republic post 1660;
- John Simpson; London-based preacher
- Anna Trapnell; religious visionary from Poplar, London, who opposed The Protectorate, and was considered mad for her advocacy of gender equality. Arrested in 1654, released in 1656, and thereafter disappears from the historical record;

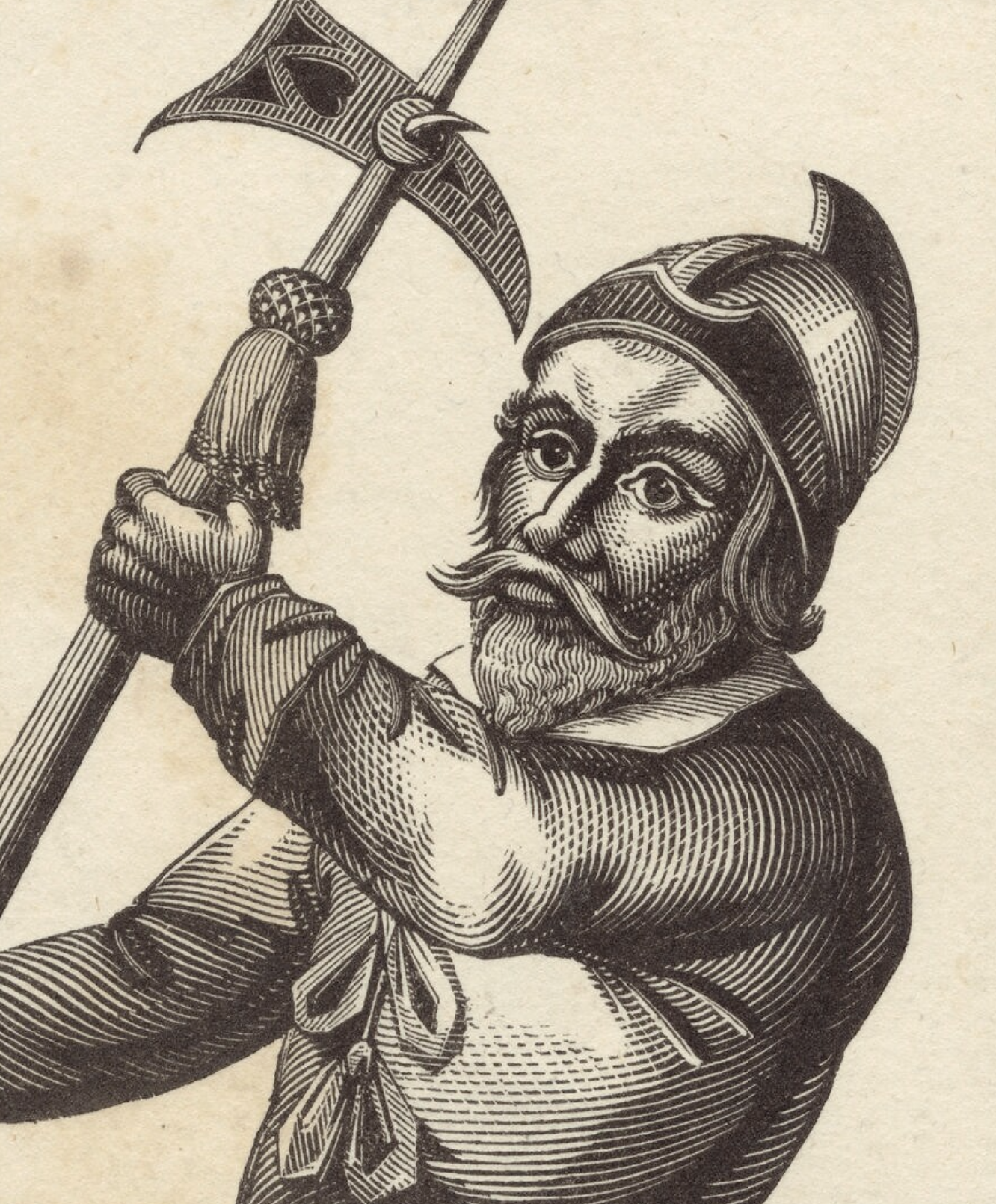
Thomas Venner, executed for treason in 1661

- Thomas Venner; leader of the "Fighting Saints", executed after an abortive rising in January 1661;
- Arthur Haselrig; one of the Five Members whose attempted arrest in January 1642 was a major step on the road to civil war in August, he shared many of their views, including opposition to The Protectorate. He sought to prevent the Stuart Restoration, and was confined in the Tower of London where he died in January 1661. In his will, Haselrig claimed to be a Fifth Monarchist.

== See also ==
- Fifth Empire, a Portuguese millennialist sect also inspired by the Four Kingdoms of Daniel

== Sources ==
- Birch, Ian (2018). "Baptists, Fifth Monarchists, and the Reign of King Jesus". Perichoresis. 16 (4): 19–34. doi:10.2478/perc-2018-0021. S2CID 165329694.
- Capp, Bernard (1971). Fifth Monarchy Men: A Study in Seventeenth Century English Millenarianism (2012 ed.). Faber & Faber. ISBN 0-571-09791-X.
- Haselrig, Sir Arthur (1661). Sir Arthur Haselrig's last will and testament with a briefe survey of his life and death. Henry Brome.
- Keay, Anna (2023). The Restless Republic. William Collins. ISBN 978-0008282059.
- Manganiello, Stephen C. (2004). The Concise Encyclopedia of the Revolutions and Wars of England, Scotland, and Ireland, 1639-1660. Scarecrow Press. ISBN 978-0-8108-5100-9.
- Plant, David. "The Fifth Monarchists". BCW Project.
- Sheppard, F. H. W., ed. (1957). Survey of London: Volume 27, Spitalfields and Mile End New Town. London. pp. 15–20.
- Solt, Leo (1961). "The Fifth Monarchy Men: Politics and the Millennium". Church History. 30 (3): 314–324. doi:10.2307/3161566. JSTOR 3161566. S2CID 154167322.
- Woolrych, Austin (1982). Commonwealth to Protectorate. Clarendon Press. ISBN 0-19-822659-4.
