= Christopher Feake =

English Independent minister (1612–1683)

Christopher Feake (1612–1683) was an English Independent minister and Fifth-monarchy man. He was imprisoned for maligning Oliver Cromwell in his preaching. He is a leading example of someone sharing both Leveller views and the millenarian approach of the Fifth Monarchists. His violence was exclusively verbal, but he wrote against the Quakers.

== Life ==
He began public life as an independent minister in London. His earlier history is unknown. About 1643 he was lecturing at All Hallows the Great, with Henry Jessey and Robert Bragg. Thomas Edwards reports that in 1645 he was a preacher in London without settled charge. At St. Peter's, Cornhill, St. Mary's Woolchurch, and elsewhere as he could, he discoursed in favour of close communion and gathered churches, and against tithes and the Westminster Assembly.

In January 1646 he obtained the sequestered vicarage of All Saints, Hertford. Here he did not observe the order of public worship prescribed by the Directory of Public Worship; he discarded psalm-singing and the use of the Lord's Prayer, and refrained from baptising infants. In his preaching he predicted the downfall of all governments, on the ground of their enmity to Christ; that of Holland was doomed for tolerating Arminianism. When articles were exhibited against Feake by a justice of the peace at the Hertford assizes, followers invaded the court, and the judge dismissed the case.

In 1649, on the sequestration of William Jenkyn, Feake received the vicarage of Christ Church, Newgate, and one of the lectureships at St. Anne's, Blackfriars. On 28 April 1650 he preached at Mercers' Chapel, before Thomas Foote who was Lord Mayor, a Fifth-monarchy sermon which was published. Soon after this he gathered or joined a Baptist church meeting at Blackfriars, and subsequently in Warwick Lane.

In October 1651 he was the leader of a radical group breaking away from Cromwell and the army leadership, who thought personal interests were getting the upper hand. The launch of the Fifth Monarchist political movement, led by Feake and John Simpson, occurred in December 1651. Feake's preaching became more and more virulent in its attacks on the existing government. In November 1653 he said that Barebone's Parliament was no improvement on the Rump Parliament. He then spoke of Cromwell (18 December 1653) as "the most dissembling and perjured villain in the world."

For this kind of language he was brought before the council of state, deprived of his preferment, and committed to Windsor Castle. He appears to have been liberated in 1655, but was soon brought again before the council, and having been examined by Cromwell, was sent back to Windsor. Cromwell did not put him on trial, on the grounds that the sentence would have been death. In the summer of 1656 he was still nominally a prisoner, living in London under a type of house arrest. He seems to have been set at full liberty on Cromwell's death, and in 1660 he disappears from view. At the time of his arrest (1653) he had a wife and eight children.

== Works ==
Feake's publications included:

- The Genealogy of Christianity, &c. 1650, (sermon on Acts xi. 26, mentioned above; it is dedicated to the Lord Mayor).
- 'Recommendatory Epistle,' prefixed to 'The Little Horns Doom,' &c. 1651, by Mary Carr, afterwards Rande, a millenarian.
- Advertisement to the Reader,' signed by Feake and others, prefixed to 'A Faithful Discovery,' &c. 1653, 4to; 2nd edit. 1655, 4to (a work against the Yorkshire quakers by John Pomroy, Joseph Kellet, and Paul Glissen).
- 'The New Nonconformist,' &c. 1654. 4to (written from Windsor Castle).
- 'The Oppressed Close Prisoner in Windsor Castle,' &c. 1655.
- Address 'to the Reader' prefixed to 'Mr. Tillinghast's Eight last Sermons.' &c. 1656; this also is written from his 'watchtower;' he mentions that it was his second imprisonment. John Tillinghast, who died early in 1655, was minister of a congregational church at Trunch, Norfolk, and a Fifth-monarchy man).
- Address 'to the Readers' on church government, prefixed to 'The Prophets Malachy and Isaiah prophesying to the Saints,' &c. 1656. (mentions his house arrest).
- 'The Time of the End,' &c. 1657, by John Canne, preface by Feake.
- 'A Beam of Light,' &c. 1659, (pamphlet dealing with recent political history).

Feake is mentioned in The Declaration of Prophetick Proposals, touching Mr. Feak, &c. 1653 [i.e. February 1654], by Arise Evans. A tract entitled Proh Tempora! Proh Mores! 1654, by 'J. N., a Mechanick,' refers to a publication called Mr. Christopher Feakes Exhortations, and mentions that although Feake 'derides psalmsinging' he 'makes new songs.' A publication entitled A Word for All: or the Rump's Funerall Sermon, held forth by Mr. Feak to a Conventicle of Fanatiques at Bedlam, &c. 1660, is a lampoon on Feake.
