= Anna Trapnel =

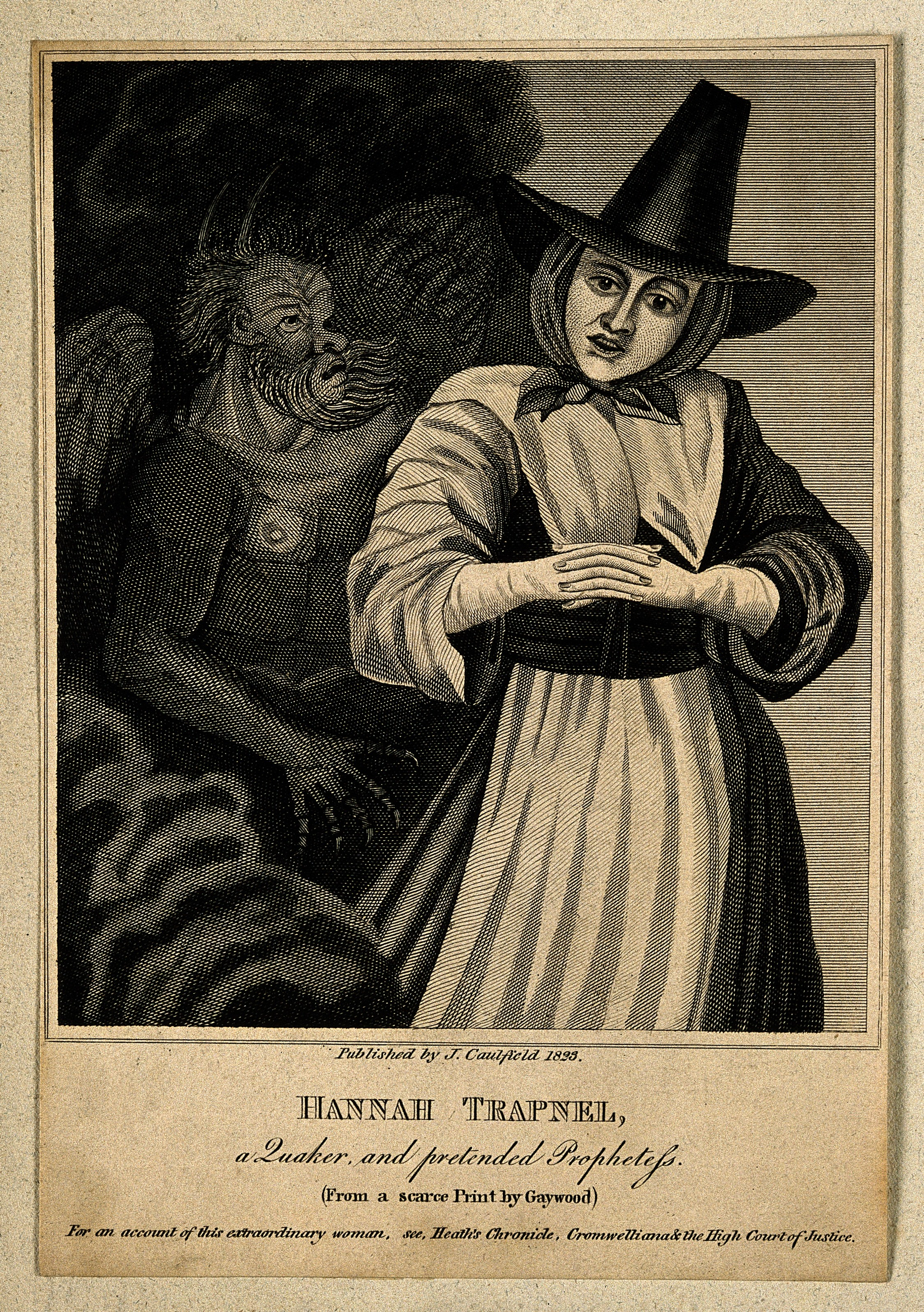
- Occupation: Prophet

Anna Trapnel (fl. 1642-1660) was a travelling Baptist prophet and Fifth Monarchist active in England in the 1650s.

== Early life ==
Trapnel was born in Poplar in the parish of Stepney to the east of the City of London to William Trapnel, a shipwright, and Anne.

Trapnel traveled over 270 miles from London to Cornwall.

After her mother’s death, she began to experience religious raptures and visions; she attended the Baptist church and was involved with Familism before joining the Fifth Monarchists in 1652.

In April 1654 she was arrested on charges of witchcraft, madness, whoredom, vagrancy, and seditious intent; she answered the judges’ questions with parables and bible verses and managed to avoid the death penalty.

Most of her publications began as transcriptions of her sayings which were written down by a friend during her times of spiritual rapture.

Many of her works foretold the defeat of all political rulers due to Jesus’ victorious return to earth.

== Works ==
- The Cry of a Stone, 1654
- Strange and Wonderful News from White-Hall: Or, The Mighty Visions Proceeding from Mistris Anna Trapnel, 1654
- Anna Trapnel's Report and Plea; or, a Narrative of Her Journey from London into Cornwall, 1654
- A Legacy for Saints; Being Several Experiences of the dealings of God with Anna Trapnel, 1654
- A lively voice for the king of saints and nations 1658

== External link ==
- Works by or about Anna Trapnel at the Internet Archive
