= Stuart Restoration =

1660 restoration of the monarchy in the British Isles

- 1660–1688
Interregnum	Georgian era
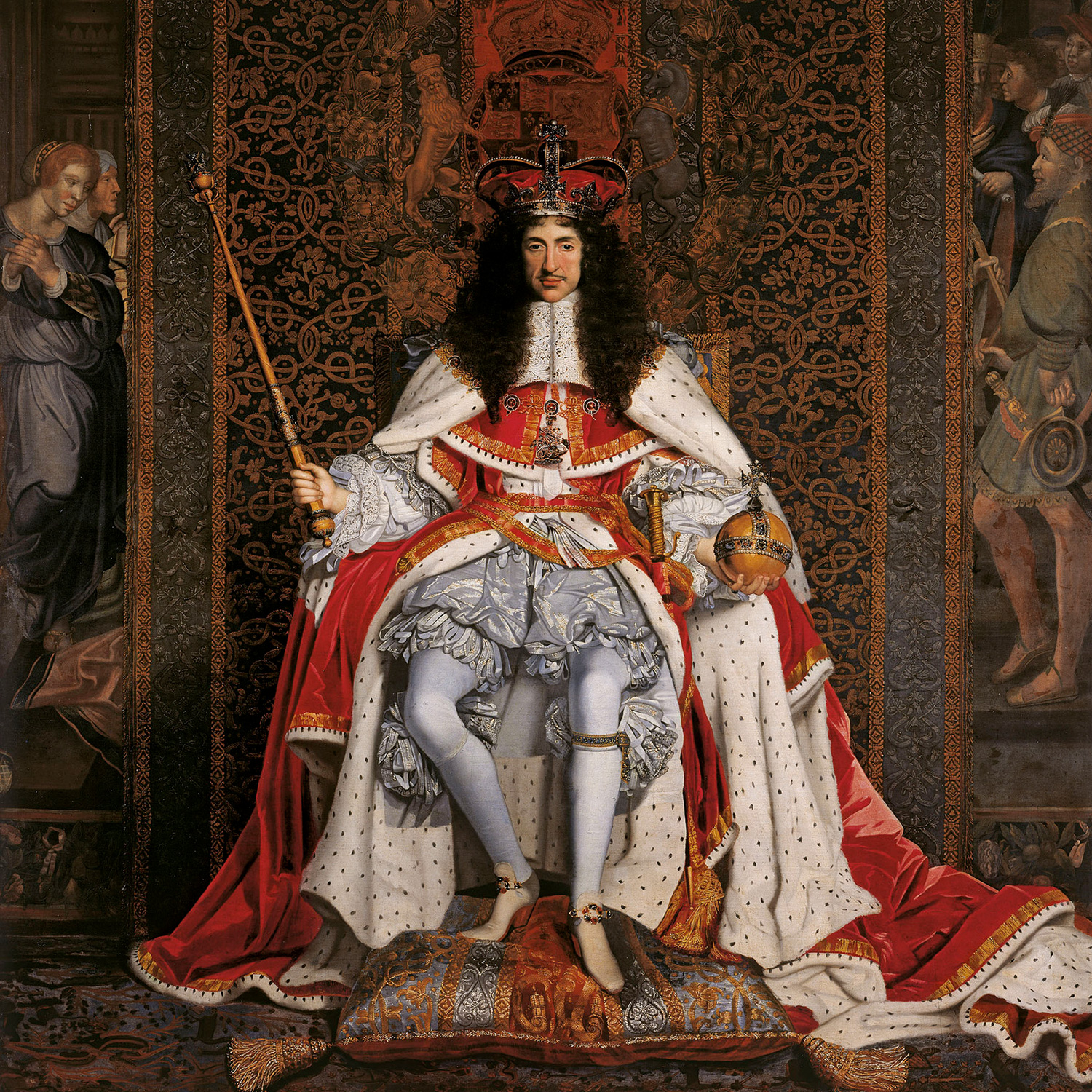
- King Charles II in coronation robes by John Michael Wright
- Monarchs: Charles II; James II; William III; Mary II; Anne
- Leader: Thomas Parker

The Stuart Restoration was the return in May 1660 of the Stuart monarchy to the kingdoms of England, Scotland, and Ireland, ending the Interregnum and the Commonwealth of England that had been established after the execution of Charles I in January 1649. The Commonwealth had been governed by the Lord Protector Oliver Cromwell and, briefly, his son Richard Cromwell, before political instability and the intervention of General George Monck led to the Declaration of Breda and the return of Charles II from exile. Charles landed at Dover on 25 May 1660 and entered London on 29 May, his thirtieth birthday. He was crowned at Westminster Abbey on 23 April 1661. The term "Restoration" is also used more broadly to describe the reign of Charles II (1660–1685), and sometimes that of his brother James II (1685–1688).

The Restoration had significant political and legal consequences. The Indemnity and Oblivion Act 1660 granted a general pardon to most former opponents of the Crown, but excluded those directly involved in the trial and execution of Charles I. Ten of these regicides were executed in October 1660 at sites including Charing Cross and Tyburn. The exhumed bodies of Oliver Cromwell, Henry Ireton, and John Bradshaw were subjected to posthumous execution in January 1661. A further nineteen regicides were imprisoned for life. The Cavalier Parliament, which first met in May 1661 and sat for over seventeen years, was strongly royalist and oversaw the re-establishment of the Church of England through the Clarendon Code, a series of measures including the Act of Uniformity 1662.

Culturally, the Restoration marked a reaction against the stricter moral and social climate associated with Puritanism during the Interregnum. Theatres, which had been closed under the Commonwealth, reopened, and Restoration comedy flourished. Women appeared on the public stage as professional performers for the first time in England. The court of Charles II became an important centre of artistic and literary life, contributing to the development of Restoration literature and distinctive styles in art and design, influenced in part by continental tastes, especially Dutch and French.

The Restoration period is commonly considered to have ended with the Glorious Revolution of 1688. In that year, the Dutch stadtholder William of Orange intervened in England with the support of Protestant political elites, leading to the flight of James II to France. A Convention Parliament declared that James had abdicated and offered the crown jointly to William III and Mary II. The subsequent Bill of Rights 1689 established limits on royal authority and barred Roman Catholics from the English throne.

== The Protectorate ==
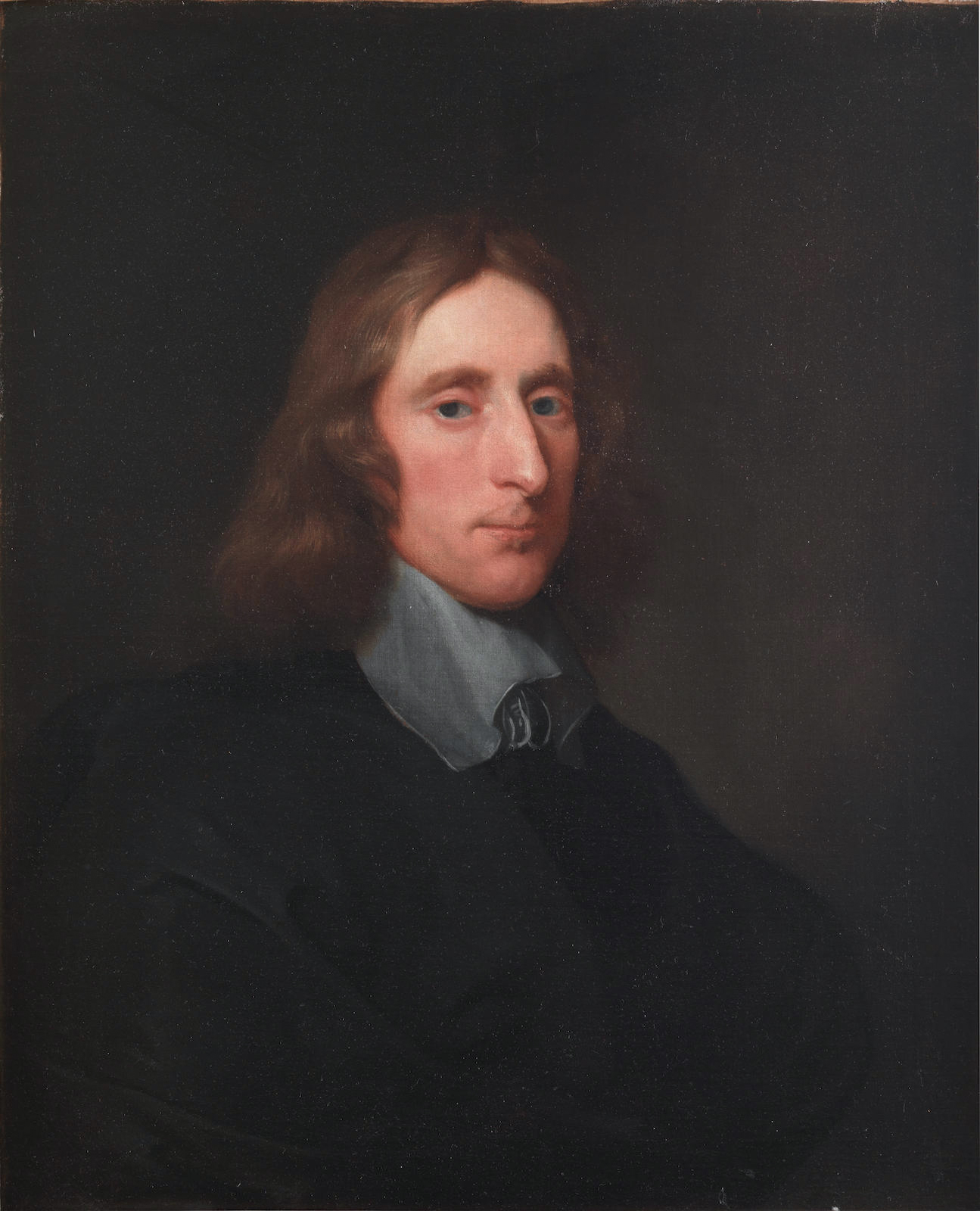
Richard Cromwell Lord Protectorate of Britain September 3, 1658 - May 25, 1659

After Richard Cromwell, Lord Protector from 1658 to 1659, ceded power to the Rump Parliament, Charles Fleetwood and John Lambert then dominated government for a year. On 20 October 1659, George Monck, the governor of Scotland under the Cromwells, marched south with his army from Scotland to oppose Fleetwood and Lambert. Lambert's army began to leave him, and he returned to London almost alone whilst Monck marched to London unopposed. The Presbyterian members, excluded in Pride's Purge of 1648, were recalled, and on 24 December the army restored the Long Parliament.

Fleetwood was deprived of his command and ordered to appear before Parliament to answer for his conduct. On 3 March 1660, Lambert was sent to the Tower of London, from which he escaped a month later. He tried to rekindle the civil war in favour of the Commonwealth by issuing a proclamation calling on all supporters of the "Good Old Cause" to rally on the battlefield of Edgehill, but he was recaptured by Colonel Richard Ingoldsby, a participant in the regicide of Charles I who hoped to win a pardon by handing Lambert over to the new regime. Lambert was incarcerated and died in custody in 1684; Ingoldsby was pardoned.

== Restoration of Charles II ==
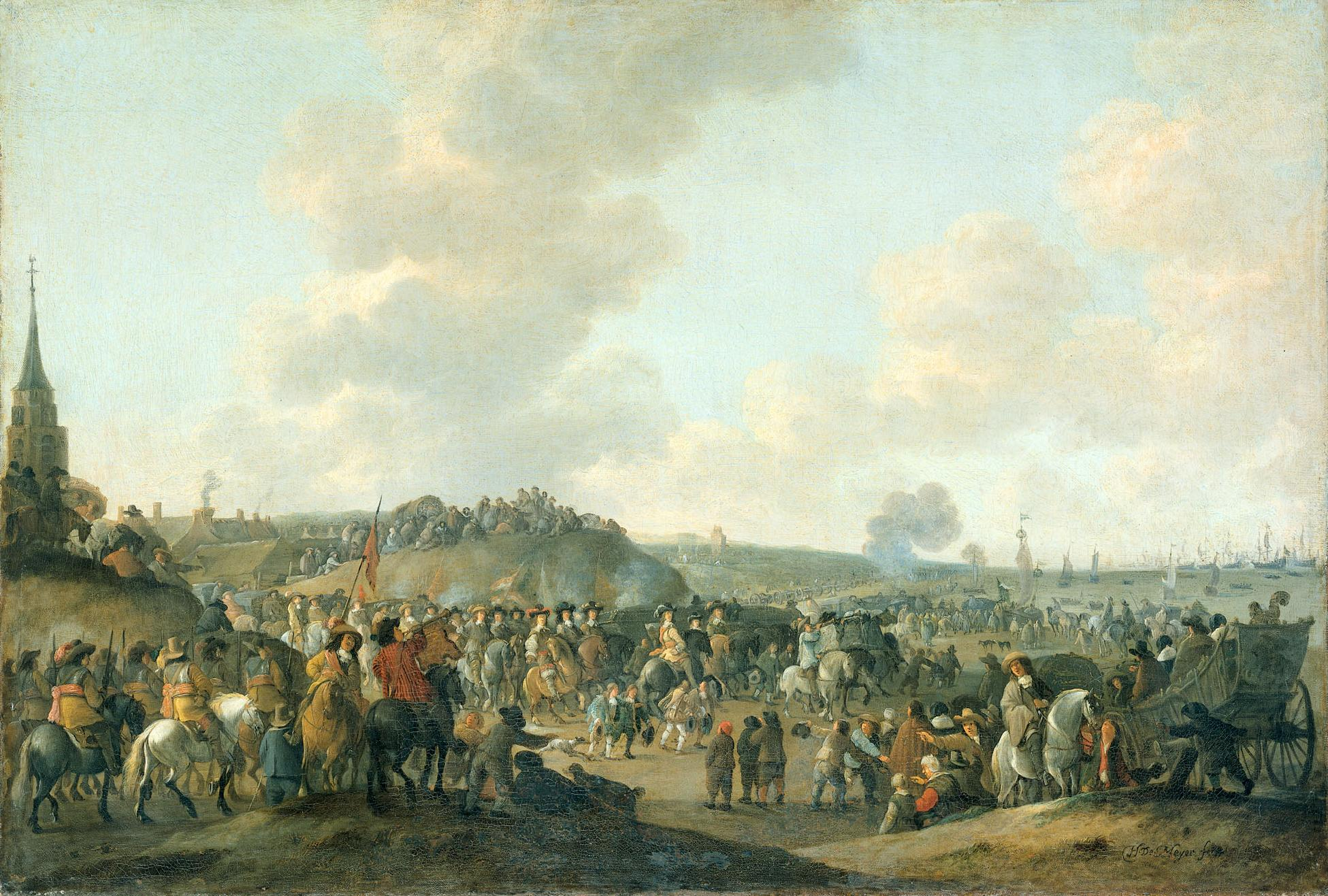
The departure of Charles II from Scheveningen (1660)

On 4 April 1660, Charles II issued the Declaration of Breda, in which he made several promises in relation to the reclamation of the crown of England. While he did this, Monck organised the Convention Parliament, which met for the first time on 25 April. On 8 May, it proclaimed that King Charles II had been the lawful monarch since the execution of Charles I on 30 January 1649. Historian Timothy J. G. Harris would later argue that "Constitutionally, it was as if the last nineteen years had never happened."

Charles returned from exile, leaving The Hague on 23 May and landing at Dover on 25 May. He entered London on 29 May 1660, his 30th birthday. To celebrate his return to his Parliament, 29 May was made a public holiday, popularly known as Oak Apple Day. He was crowned at Westminster Abbey on 23 April 1661.

Some contemporaries described the Restoration as "a divinely ordained miracle". The sudden and unexpected deliverance from political chaos was interpreted as a restoration of the natural and divine order. Many pamphlets arguing for the restoration of the Monarchy would be printed arguing on the grounds of tradition and calling back to the long history of monarchy in England and how it was fundamental to the fabric of English society. The Cavalier Parliament convened for the first time on 8 May 1661, and it would endure for over 17 years, finally being dissolved on 24 January 1679. Like its predecessor, it was overwhelmingly Royalist. It is also known as the Pensionary Parliament for the many pensions it granted to adherents of the King.

Upon returning to the throne Charles immediately set out on restoring Militias under Lord Lieutenants under the advice of his newly restored Privy council. Having to rely on the Kings prerogative powers to tax meant Charles could raise Militias but had the risk of his subjects refusing work with the Militia and let Parliament undercut the Kings efforts. This weak control of the military and fear of absolutism would lead Parliament two years before a Militia bill would be passed

The leading political figure at the beginning of the Restoration was Edward Hyde, 1st Earl of Clarendon. It was the "skill and wisdom of Clarendon" which had "made the Restoration unconditional".

Many Royalist exiles returned and were rewarded. Prince Rupert of the Rhine returned to the service of England, became a member of the privy council, and was provided with an annuity. George Goring, 1st Earl of Norwich, returned to be the Captain of the King's guard and received a pension. Marmaduke Langdale returned and was made "Baron Langdale". William Cavendish, Marquess of Newcastle, returned and was able to regain the greater part of his estates. He was invested in 1666 with the Order of the Garter (which had been bestowed upon him in 1650), and was advanced to a dukedom on 16 March 1665.

== England and Wales ==
=== Commonwealth regicides and rebels ===
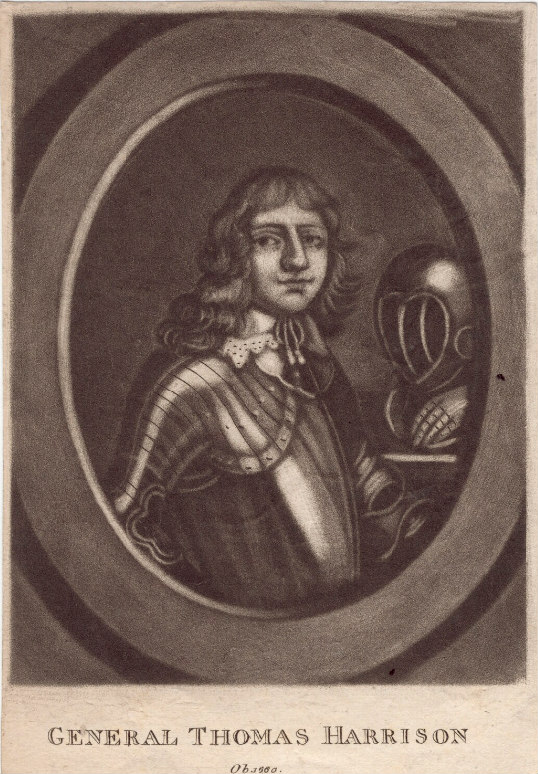
Thomas Harrison, the first person found guilty of regicide during the Restoration

The Indemnity and Oblivion Act, which became law on 29 August 1660, pardoned all past treason against the crown, but specifically excluded those involved in the trial and execution of Charles I. Thirty-one of the 59 commissioners (judges) who had signed the death warrant in 1649 were living. The regicides were hunted down; some escaped but most were found and put on trial. Three escaped to the American colonies. New Haven, Connecticut, secretly harboured Edward Whalley, William Goffe and John Dixwell, and after American independence named streets after them to honour them as forefathers of the American Revolution.

In the ensuing trials, twelve were condemned to death. The Fifth Monarchist Thomas Harrison, the first person found guilty of regicide, who had been the seventeenth of the 59 commissioners to sign the death warrant, was the first regicide to be hanged, drawn and quartered because he was considered by the new government still to represent a real threat to the re-established order. In October 1660, at Charing Cross or Tyburn, London, ten were publicly hanged, drawn and quartered: Thomas Harrison, John Jones, Adrian Scrope, John Carew, Thomas Scot, and Gregory Clement, who had signed the king's death warrant; the preacher Hugh Peters; Francis Hacker and Daniel Axtell, who commanded the guards at the king's trial and execution; and John Cooke, the solicitor who directed the prosecution. The 10 judges who were on the panel but did not sign the death warrant were also convicted.

Oliver Cromwell, Henry Ireton, Judge Thomas Pride, and Judge John Bradshaw were posthumously attainted for high treason. Because Parliament is a court, a bill of attainder is a legislative act declaring a person guilty of treason or felony, in contrast to the regular judicial process of trial and conviction. In January 1661, the corpses of Cromwell, Ireton and Bradshaw were exhumed and hanged in chains at Tyburn.

In 1661 John Okey, one of the regicides who signed the death warrant of Charles I, was brought back from Holland along with Miles Corbet, friend and lawyer to Cromwell, and John Barkstead, former constable of the Tower of London. They were all imprisoned in the Tower. From there they were taken to Tyburn and hanged, drawn and quartered on 19 April 1662. A further 19 regicides were imprisoned for life.

John Lambert was not in London for the trial of Charles I. At the Restoration, he was found guilty of high treason and remained in custody in Guernsey for the rest of his life. Henry Vane the Younger served on the Council of State during the Interregnum even though he refused to take the oath which expressed approbation (approval) of the King's execution. At the Restoration, after much debate in Parliament, he was exempted from the Indemnity and Oblivion Act. In 1662 he was tried for high treason, found guilty and beheaded on Tower Hill on 14 June 1662.

With the dissolution of the Oxford Parliament on the 28 of March 1681 and the failure to remove James from the line of succession leaders of the opposition to Charles rule would flee to Holland with these men founding the Whig party. The more radical members of the Whigs would work with republicans to plot to assassinate Charles and James in the Rye House Plot. The plot ultimately failed with the outbreak of a major fire in Newmarket causing Charles and James to return to London early. The plot was discovered on 23 of June 1683 and the government would crack down heavily on the Whig party including MP William Russell and former Lord Algernon Sideny.

Though regicide was widely condemned and many Regicides were executed or imprisoned after 1660, the revolutionary idea of conditional monarchy endured. In political writings and the debates of the period, the notion that a king should rule in accordance with the will of the people or law became increasingly widespread. Even Edward Hyde, Earl of Clarendon and Charles II's chief advisor, acknowledged the need for a balanced constitutional arrangement in his efforts to secure a lasting postwar settlement.

=== Regrant of certain Commonwealth titles ===
The Instrument of Government, The Protectorate's written constitutions, gave to the Lord Protector the King's power to grant titles of honour. Over 30 new knighthoods were granted under the Protectorate. These knighthoods passed into oblivion upon the Restoration of Charles II, but many were regranted by the restored King.

Of the eleven Protectorate baronetcies, two had been previously granted by Charles I during the Civil War, but under Commonwealth legislation they were not recognised under the Protectorate (hence the Lord Protector's regranting of them). When that legislation passed into oblivion these two baronets were entitled to use the baronetcies granted by Charles I, and Charles II regranted four more. Only one now continues: Richard Thomas Willy, 14th baronet, is the direct successor of Griffith Williams. Of the remaining Protectorate baronets one, William Ellis, was granted a knighthood by Charles II.

Edmund Dunch was created Baron Burnell of East Wittenham in April 1658, but this barony was not regranted. The male line failed in 1719 with the death of his grandson, also Edmund Dunch, so no one can lay claim to the title.

The one hereditary viscountcy Cromwell created for certain, (Note: Cromwell had intended to make Bulstrode Whitelocke a viscount, but it is not clear if he did so before he died.) (making Charles Howard Viscount Howard of Morpeth and Baron Gilsland) continues to this day. In April 1661, Howard was created Earl of Carlisle, Viscount Howard of Morpeth, and Baron Dacre of Gillesland. The present Earl is a direct descendant of this Cromwellian creation and Restoration recreation.

=== Venner rebellion (1661) ===
On 6 January 1661, about 50 Fifth Monarchists, headed by a wine-cooper named Thomas Venner, tried to gain possession of London in the name of "King Jesus". Most were either killed or taken prisoner; on 19 and 21 January 1661, Venner and 10 others were hanged, drawn and quartered for high treason.

=== Church of England settlement ===
The Church of England was restored as the national Church in England, backed by the Clarendon Code and the Act of Uniformity 1662. People reportedly "pranced around May poles as a way of taunting the Presbyterians and Independents" and "burned copies of the Solemn League and Covenant".

== Ireland ==
"The commonwealth parliamentary union was, after 1660, treated as null and void". As in England the republic was deemed constitutionally never to have occurred. The Convention Parliament was dissolved by Charles II in January 1661, and he summoned his first parliament in Ireland in May 1661. In 1662, 29 May was made a public holiday known to this day as Oak Apple Day.

Coote, Broghill and Maurice Eustace were initially the main political figures in the Restoration. George Monck, Duke of Albemarle was given the position of Lord Lieutenant of Ireland but he did not assume office. In 1662 James Butler, 1st Duke of Ormond returned as the Lord Lieutenant of Ireland and became the predominant political figure of the Restoration period.

== Scotland ==
Charles was proclaimed King again on 14 May 1660. He was not crowned, having been previously crowned at Scone in 1651. The Restoration "presented an occasion of universal celebration and rejoicing throughout Scotland".

Charles II summoned his parliament on 1 January 1661, which began to undo all that been forced on his father Charles I of Scotland. The Rescissory Act 1661 made all legislation back to 1633 'void and null'.

== English colonies ==
=== Caribbean ===
Barbados, as a haven for refugees fleeing the English republic, had held for Charles II under Lord Willoughby until defeated by George Ayscue. When news reached Barbados of the King's restoration, Thomas Modyford declared Barbados for the King in July 1660. The planters, however, were not eager for the return of the former governor Lord Willoughby, fearing disputes over titles, but the King ordered he be restored.

Jamaica had been a conquest of Oliver Cromwell's and Charles II's claim to the island was therefore questionable. However, Charles II chose not to restore Jamaica to Spain and in 1661 it became a British colony and the planters would claim that they held rights as Englishmen by the King's assumption of the dominion of Jamaica. The first governor was Lord Windsor. He was replaced in 1664 by Thomas Modyford who had been ousted from Barbados.

=== North America ===
==== New England ====
New England, with its Puritan settlement, had supported the Commonwealth and the Protectorate. Acceptance of the Restoration was reluctant in some quarters as it highlighted the failure of Puritan reform. Rhode Island declared in October 1660 and Massachusetts lastly in August 1661. The Colony of New Haven provided refuge for Regicides such as Edward Whalley, William Goffe and John Dixwell and would be subsequently merged into Connecticut in 1662, perhaps in punishment. John Winthrop, a former governor of Connecticut, and one of whose sons had been a captain in Monck's army, went to England at the Restoration and in 1662 obtained a royal charter for Connecticut with New Haven annexed to it.

King Charles would attempt to assert control over the New England Colonies by sending over the Royal Commission of 1664. Part of their goals were to provide a Court of Appeal against the excesses of the Puritan Massachusetts government. Later, he would sever the northern county of Massachusetts to create the royally controlled Province of New Hampshire. Political backlash helped spark Gove's Rebellion.

==== Maryland and Virginia ====
Maryland had resisted the republic until finally occupied by New England Puritans/Parliamentary forces after the Battle of the Severn in 1655. In 1660 the Governor Josias Fendall tried to turn Maryland into a Commonwealth of its own in what is known as Fendall's Rebellion but with the fall of the republic in England he was left without support and was replaced by Philip Calvert upon the Restoration.

Virginia was the most loyal of King Charles II's dominions. It had, according to the eighteenth-century historian Robert Beverley Jr., been "the last of all the King's Dominions that submitted to the Usurpation". Virginia had provided sanctuary for Cavaliers fleeing the English republic. In 1650, Virginia was one of the Royalist colonies that became the subject of Parliament's An Act for prohibiting Trade with the Barbadoes, Virginia, Bermuda and Antego. William Berkeley, who had previously been governor up until 1652, was elected governor in 1660 by the House of Burgesses and he promptly declared for the King. The Anglican Church was restored as the established church.

==== Carolina ====
In 1663 the Province of Carolina was formed as a reward given to some supporters of the Restoration. The province was named after the King's father, Charles I. The town of Charleston was established in 1669 by a party of settlers from Bermuda (some being Bermudians aboard Bermudian vessels, others having passed through Bermuda from as far as England) under the same William Sayle who had led the Eleutheran Adventurers to the Bahamas. In 1670, Sayle became the first Colonial Governor of the Province of Carolina.

==== Bermuda ====
The Somers Isles, alias Bermuda (originally named Virgineola), was originally part of Virginia, and was administered by the Somers Isles Company, a spin-off of the Virginia Company, until 1684. The already existing contest between the mostly Parliamentarian Adventurers (shareholders) of the company in England and the Bermudians, who had their own House of Assembly (and many of whom were becoming landowners as they were sold the land they had previously farmed as tenants as the profitability of the tobacco farmed exclusively for the company fell), placed the Bermudians on the side of the Crown despite the large number of Puritans in the colony.

Bermudians were attempting to shift their economy from tobacco to a maritime one and were being thwarted by the company, which relied on revenue from tobacco cultivation. Bermuda was the first colony to recognise Charles II as King in 1649. It controlled its own "army" (of militia) and deposed the Company appointed Governor, electing a replacement. Its Independent Puritans were forced to emigrate, settling the Bahamas under prominent Bermudian settler, sometime Governor of Bermuda, and Parliamentary loyalist William Sayle as the Eleutheran Adventurers. Although eventually reaching a compromise with the Commonwealth, the Bermudians dispute with the company continued and was finally taken before the restored Crown, which was keen for an opportunity to re-assert its authority over the wealthy businessmen who controlled the Somers Isles Company.

The islanders' protest to the Crown initially concerned the mis-treatment of Perient Trott and his heirs (including Nicholas Trott), but expanded to include the company's wider mismanagement of the colony. This led to a lengthy court case in which the Crown championed Bermudians against the company, and resulted in the company's Royal Charter being revoked in 1684. From that point onwards the Crown assumed responsibility for appointing the Colony's governors (it first re-appointed the last company governor). Freed of the company's restraints, the emerging local merchant class came to dominate and shape Bermuda's progress, as Bermudians abandoned agriculture en masse and turned to seafaring.

== Culture ==
The Restoration and Charles' coronation mark a reversal of the stringent Puritan morality, "as though the pendulum [of England's morality] swung from repression to licence more or less overnight". Theatres reopened after having been closed during the protectorship, Puritanism lost its momentum, and bawdy comedy became a recognisable genre. In addition, women were allowed to perform on the commercial stage as professional actresses for the first time. In Scotland, the bishops returned as the Episcopacy was reinstated. To celebrate the occasion and cement their diplomatic relations, the Dutch Republic presented Charles with the Dutch Gift, a fine collection of old master paintings, classical sculptures, furniture, and a yacht.

=== Literature ===
Restoration literature includes the roughly homogenous styles of literature that centre on a celebration of or reaction to the restored court of King Charles II. It is a literature that includes extremes, for it encompasses both Paradise Lost and the John Wilmot, 2nd Earl of Rochester's Sodom, the high-spirited sexual comedy of The Country Wife and the moral wisdom of The Pilgrim's Progress. It saw Locke's Treatises of Government, the founding of the Royal Society, the experiments and holy meditations of Robert Boyle, the hysterical attacks on theatres from Jeremy Collier, and the pioneering of literary criticism from John Dryden and John Dennis. The period witnessed news become a commodity, the essay develop into a periodical art form, and the beginnings of textual criticism.

=== Style ===
The return of the king and his court from exile led to the replacement of the Puritan severity of the Cromwellian style with a taste for magnificence and opulence and to the introduction of Dutch and French artistic influences. These are evident in furniture in the use of floral marquetry, walnut instead of oak, twisted turned supports and legs, exotic veneers, cane seats and backs on chairs, sumptuous tapestry and velvet upholstery and ornate carved and gilded scrolling bases for cabinets Similar shifts appear in prose style.

=== Comedy ===
Comedy, especially bawdy comedy, flourished, and a favourite setting was the bed-chamber. Indeed, sexually explicit language was encouraged by the king personally and by the rakish style of his court. Historian George Norman Clark argues:

The best-known fact about the Restoration drama is that it is immoral. The dramatists did not criticize the accepted morality about gambling, drink, love, and pleasure generally, or try, like the dramatists of our own time, to work out their own view of character and conduct. What they did was, according to their respective inclinations, to mock at all restraints. Some were gross, others delicately improper....The dramatists did not merely say anything they liked: they also intended to glory in it and to shock those who did not like it.

The socially diverse audiences included both aristocrats, their servants and hangers-on, and a substantial middle-class segment. These playgoers were attracted to the comedies by up-to-the-minute topical writing, by crowded and bustling plots, by the introduction of the first professional actresses, and by the rise of the first celebrity actors. This period saw the first professional female playwright, Aphra Behn.

=== Spectacular ===
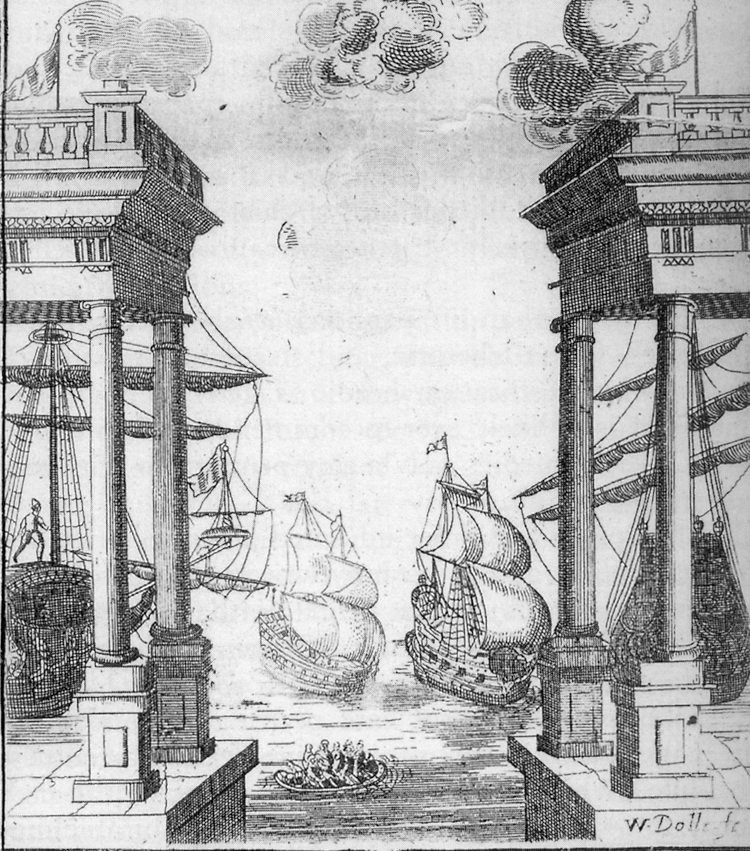
This naval battle was one of the sets for Elkanah Settle's Empress of Morocco (1673) at the theatre in Dorset Garden.

The Restoration spectacular, or elaborately staged machine play, hit the London public stage in the late 17th-century Restoration period, enthralling audiences with action, music, dance, moveable scenery, baroque illusionistic painting, gorgeous costumes, and special effects such as trapdoor tricks, "flying" actors, and fireworks. These shows have always had a bad reputation as a vulgar and commercial threat to the witty, "legitimate" Restoration drama; however, they drew Londoners in unprecedented numbers and left them dazzled and delighted.

Basically home-grown and with roots in the early 17th-century court masque, though never ashamed of borrowing ideas and stage technology from French opera, the spectaculars are sometimes called "English opera". However, the variety of them is so untidy that most theatre historians despair of defining them as a genre at all. Only a handful of works of this period are usually accorded the term "opera", as the musical dimension of most of them is subordinate to the visual. It was spectacle and scenery that drew in the crowds, as shown by many comments in the diary of the theatre-lover Samuel Pepys.

The growing cost of scenic productions exposed the two competing theatre companies to considerable financial risk. The poor commercial performance of John Dryden's Albion and Albanius would leave a company in serious debt, while successful productions, like Thomas Shadwell's Psyche or Dryden's King Arthur would substantially improve a company's finances.

== End of the Restoration ==
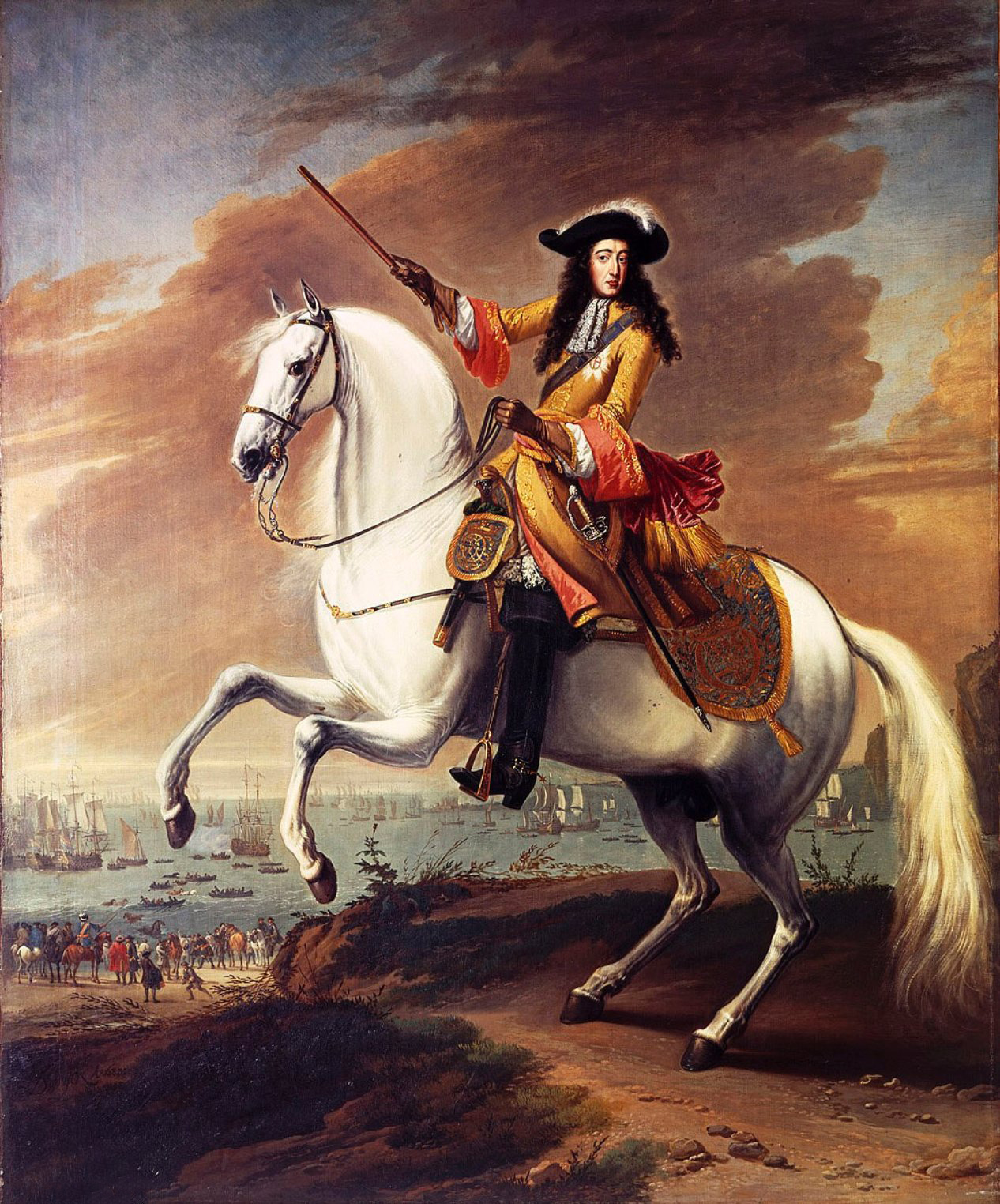
Equestrian portrait of William III by Jan Wyck, commemorating the start of the Glorious Revolution in 1688

The Restoration was ended by the Glorious Revolution, which overthrew King James II of England, propelled by a union of English Parliamentarians with the Dutch stadtholder William III of Orange-Nassau (William of Orange). William's successful invasion of England with a Dutch fleet and army led to his accession to the English throne as William III of England jointly with his wife Mary II of England, James's daughter.

In April 1688, James reissued the Declaration of Indulgence and ordered all Anglican clergymen to read it to their congregations. When seven bishops, including the Archbishop of Canterbury, submitted a petition requesting the reconsideration of the King's religious policies, they were arrested and tried for seditious libel. On 30 June 1688, a group of seven Protestant nobles invited William to come to England with an army. By September it became clear that William would invade England. When William arrived on 5 November 1688, James lost his nerve, declined to attack the invading Dutch and tried to flee to France. He was captured in Kent. Later, he was released and placed under Dutch protective guard. Having no desire to make James a martyr, William let him escape on 23 December. James was received in France by his cousin and ally, Louis XIV, who offered him a palace and a pension.

William convened a Convention Parliament to decide how to handle the situation. While the Parliament refused to depose James, they declared that James, having fled to France had effectively abdicated the throne, and that the throne was vacant. To fill this vacancy, Parliament declared Mary to be Queen and William to be King, to rule jointly. The English Parliament passed the Bill of Rights 1689 that denounced James for abusing his power.

The abuses charged to James included the suspension of the Test Acts after having sworn as king to uphold the supremacy of the Church of England, the prosecution of the Seven Bishops for merely petitioning the crown, the establishment of a standing army, and the imposition of cruel punishments. The bill also declared that henceforth no Roman Catholic was permitted to ascend the English throne, nor could any English monarch marry a Roman Catholic.
