= Thomas Venner =

English cooper and rebel

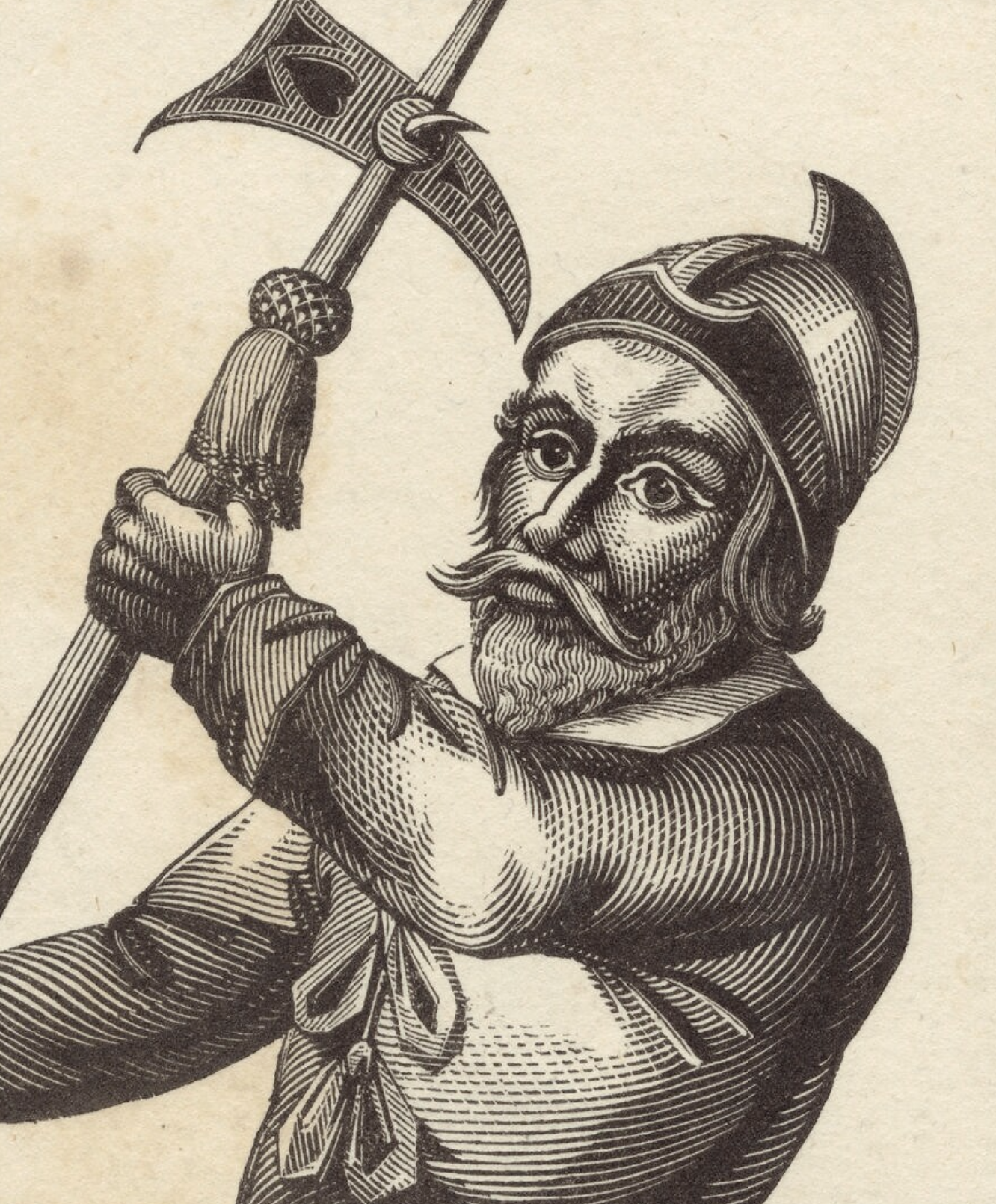
Late 18th-century portrait of Venner

Thomas Venner (died 19 January 1661 (Note: According to the then prevailing Old Style calendar, the turn of the year occurred on Lady Day, 25 March. As such, Venner died in 1660 according to contemporary accounts, but in 1661 as described by modern historians who take the start of the year to be 1 January.)) was an English cooper and rebel who became the last leader of the Fifth Monarchists, who tried unsuccessfully to overthrow Oliver Cromwell in 1657, and subsequently led a coup in London against the newly restored government of Charles II. This event, known as "Venner's Rising", lasted four days beginning on 6 January 1661 before English authorities defeated and captured the rebels, whose leadership were executed on 19 January.

== Biography ==
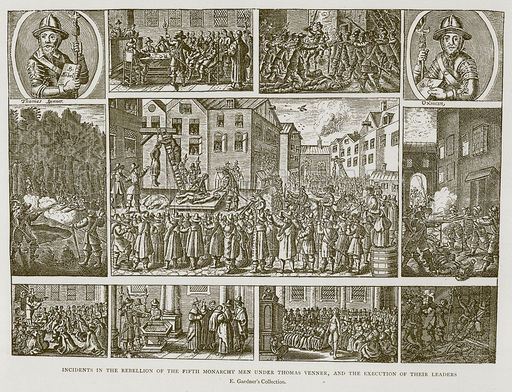
Incidents in the Rebellion of the Fifth Monarchy Men under Thomas Venner, and the Execution of their Leaders, 17th-century illustration

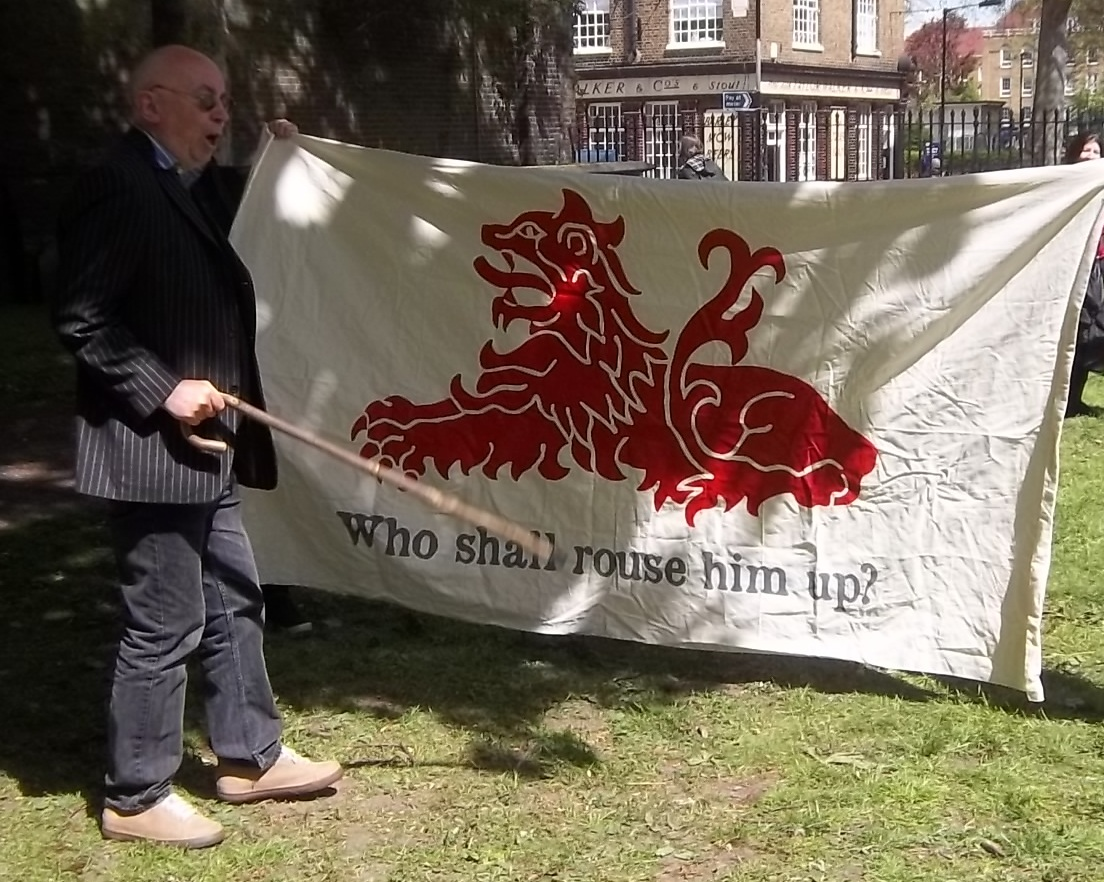
Ian Bone speaking at the installation of the Thomas Rainsborough memorial plaque (12 May 2013), championing Thomas Venner and the Fifth Monarchy Men. The banner is a replica of that used by the insurgents at the time.

Venner had moved to New England in 1637 and stayed for 22 years before returning to plot against Cromwell. He assumed leadership of the Fifth Monarchists after the execution of General Thomas Harrison at Charing Cross on 19 October 1660. Venner led a congregation, which included New Model Army veterans, that met in a rented room above a tavern in Swan's Alley off Coleman Street.

On 6 January 1661 he led a number of his men – Samuel Pepys said they later turned out to be only 50, although it had been thought they were 500 at first – to a bookseller called Mr. Johnson at St Paul's Cathedral to demand the cathedral keys. On being refused they broke in and accosted passers-by asking who they were for. One answered "King Charles" and they shot him through the heart. Several musketeers sent to dislodge them were beaten back and a detachment from the London Trained Bands under the Lord Mayor, Major General Sir Richard Browne, attacked them and they retreated to Ken Wood near Highgate.

On 9 January they attacked again at Wood Street and Threadneedle Street forcing the King's Life Guard of Foot (a force of 1200 men commanded by John Russell) to retreat. They then attempted to storm the Comptor Prison to liberate the inmates in order to join them but were repulsed by fierce fighting. Venner is said to have killed three men with a halberd in Threadneedle Street.

A force of General Monck's men under Colonel Cox pursued them to their last stands in the Helmet Tavern on Threadneedle Street and the Blue Anchor on Coleman Street. Royalist troops broke through the clay roof tiles with musket butts and fired upon the wounded defenders, breaking in through the ceiling. Venner was captured after being wounded nineteen times. Others were shot out of hand.

He was put on trial at the Old Bailey and hanged, drawn and quartered on 19 January 1661. According to Tobias Smollett, Venner and his followers "affirmed to the last that if they had been deceived, the Lord himself was their deceiver".

== Family ==
Venner's son, also Thomas (born 1641), a fellow-rebel, led the Monmouth cavalry in 1688.

His grand-daughter Elizabeth married a linen draper's son, John Potter, later Bishop of Oxford and Archbishop of Canterbury.
