= John Hewson (regicide) =

English shoemaker (died 1662)

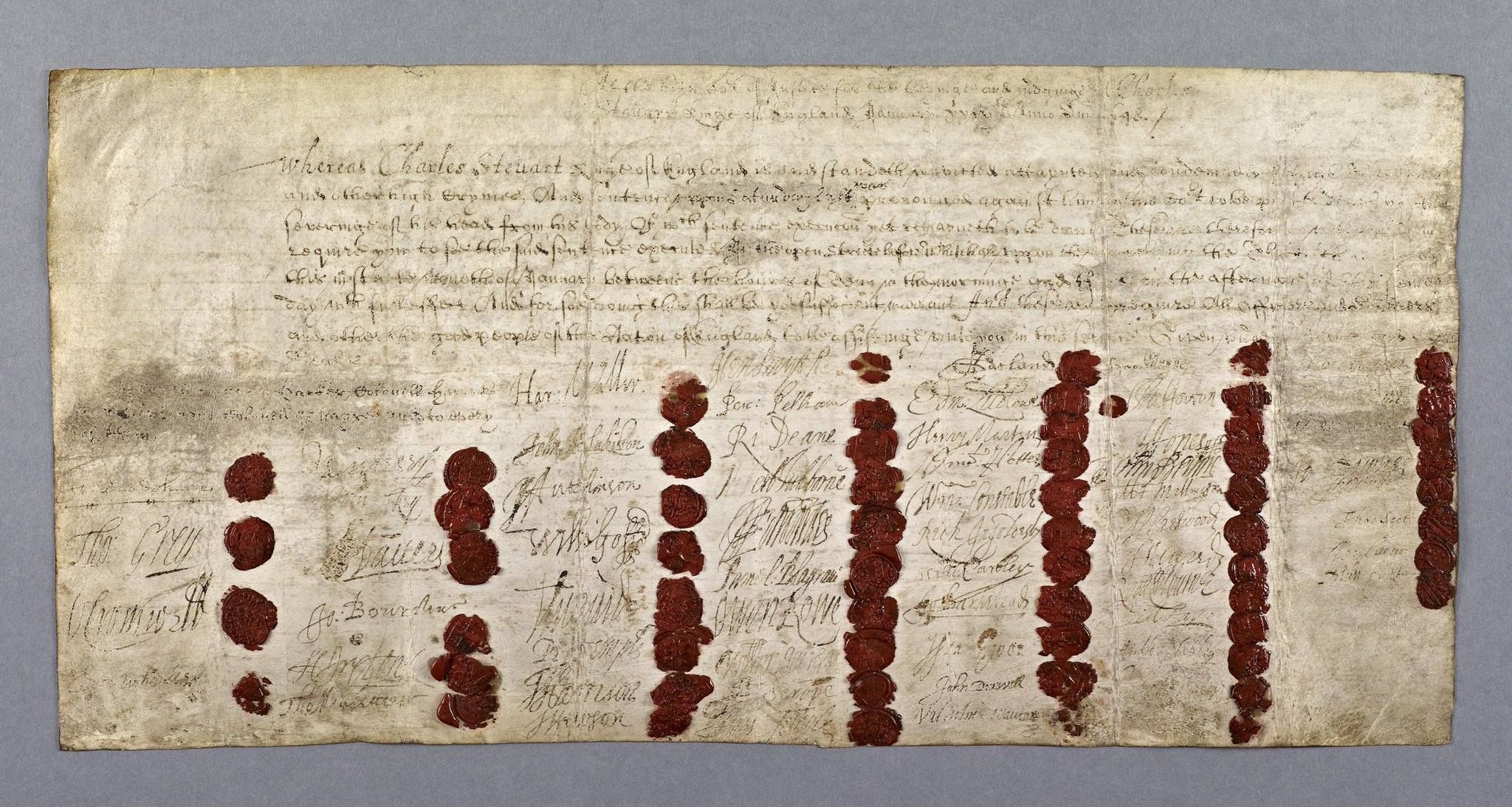
- Death warrant of Charles I; Hewson's signature is bottom of the third column from the left

Committee of Safety
- In office October 1659 – December 1659

Member of Parliament for Guildford
- In office September 1656 – January 1658

Member of Parliament for County Dublin
- In office September 1654 – January 1655

Nominated to Barebones Parliament as MP for Ireland
- In office July 1653 – December 1653

Governor of Dublin, Ireland
- In office September 1649 – October 1656

Personal details
- Born: Unknown (Note: Probably before 1604, since Hewson was working as an independent shoemaker in 1628, which required him to be at least 24 years old) London, England
- Died: 1662 Amsterdam, possibly Rouen
- Spouse(s): Twice married, unknown
- Children: Possibly three sons
- Occupation: Shoemaker, soldier, politician and religious radical

Military service
- Allegiance: Parliamentarian
- Years of service: 1642–1659
- Rank: Colonel
- Battles/wars: Wars of the Three Kingdoms; Turnham Green; Marston Moor; Second Newbury; Battle of Naseby; Langport; Bridgwater; Bristol 1645; Basing House; Siege of Exeter; Siege of Oxford; Maidstone; Drogheda; Relief of Arklow; Kilkenny

Colonel John Hewson, also spelt Hughson (died 1662), was a shoemaker from London and religious Independent who fought for Parliament and the Commonwealth in the Wars of the Three Kingdoms, reaching the rank of colonel. Considered one of Oliver Cromwell's most reliable supporters within the New Model Army, his unit played a prominent part in Pride's Purge of December 1648. Hewson signed the death warrant for the Execution of Charles I in January 1649, for which he reportedly sourced the headsman, while soldiers from his regiment provided security.

During the 1649 to 1660 Interregnum, he served as Governor of Dublin and MP for County Dublin until 1656. He then returned to England and was MP for Guildford before being elevated to Cromwell's Other House in 1658. As one of the surviving Regicides of Charles I, he was exempted from the Indemnity and Oblivion Act after the 1660 Stuart Restoration. He went into exile in the Dutch Republic, and is thought to have died in Amsterdam in 1662.

== Personal details ==
Very little is known of Hewson's life prior to 1642, other than that he worked as a shoemaker in Westminster during the late 1620s and 1630s. (Note: This is generally agreed by historians, despite claims by a 19th century descendant that he came from a "good family" of landed gentry in Tenterden, Kent) In February 1628, he is recorded as having sold eight pairs of shoes to the Massachusetts Bay Company; this suggests he was born prior to 1604, since doing so required him to be a freeman of the Worshipful Company of Cordwainers, and at least 24 years old.

Hewson himself later testified he had lived as a "child of wrath" (Note: A Biblical term then commonly used to mean "evil doers") in a "wicked and profane family" in London, before being converted through the influence of a godly preacher. He was later accused of being an Anabaptist, a sect viewed as radical revolutionaries, and in consequence persecuted by Catholics and mainstream Protestants alike.

Hewson was married twice; his first wife died in Dublin in January 1652, and he quickly remarried. The names of his partners, and whether either marriage produced children, are unknown, although one source claims he had three unrecorded "Anabaptist" sons. (Note: Births were normally registered when the child was baptised, but since Anabaptists believed in adult baptism, these records would not have existed)

== First English Civil War ==
Prior to the outbreak of the First English Civil War in August 1642, Hewson probably served in the Westminster Trained Bands, (Note: A part-time militia, membership was compulsory for householders like Hewson) which fought at Turnham Green. He subsequently joined the Parliamentarian field army, (Note: The Trained Bands were technically only required to defend London, while members of the field army could serve anywhere) and is thought to be the "John Huson" listed in November 1642 as a captain in the Earl of Essex Regiment. At some point in 1643, he transferred to the army of the Eastern Association, commanded by the Earl of Manchester, and in March 1644 was appointed Lieutenant colonel of a new infantry regiment raised by John Pickering. This unit fought at Marston Moor in July, then Second Newbury in October.

Hewson during the First and Second English Civil Wars; key locations

Pickering's Regiment was incorporated into the New Model Army in April 1645 as one of its twelve authorised infantry formations, with Hewson as Lieutenant Colonel. Like Hewson, Pickering was a religious Independent with strong Anabaptist sympathies, while other officers included Major John Jubbes, a Leveller who resigned his commission in 1647, and Daniel Axtell, a Baptist and future regicide. Their appointments had to be approved by Parliament, whose moderate Presbyterian majority viewed the growth of religious and political radicalism in the army with considerable unease. The House of Lords originally replaced Pickering and all of his company commanders, including Hewson, with officers from another regiment, before pressure from the House of Commons led them to approve the original list by one vote.

Seen as particularly close to Oliver Cromwell, in June 1645 Pickering's was described as one of the 'chiefest praying and preaching regiments in the army'. Hewson fought at Naseby in June 1645, then took part in the offensive against Royalist strongholds in South West England, including Sherborne Castle, Lacock Abbey, Bridgwater, Bristol and Basing House. While besieging Exeter in November, Pickering died at Ottery St Mary and was replaced by Hewson as colonel, with Axtell as his deputy. The regiment then joined the forces besieging the Royalist wartime capital of Oxford, whose surrender in June 1646 brought the First Civil War to an end. While stationed in the area, Hewson confirmed his reputation as a religious radical by illegally preaching in a local church, having first denounced its minister as an agent of the Antichrist.

== Second English Civil War and Cromwellian Conquest of Ireland ==
Despite victory in the First Civil War, the period that followed saw increasing conflict between the moderate majority in Parliament, and more radical elements within the New Model Army. By early 1647, its soldiers were owed more than £300,000 in wages, an enormous sum for the period, while Parliament was struggling with a shattered economy, an outbreak of the bubonic plague, and the refusal of Charles I to agree a peace settlement. Hewson acted as one of the army's representatives in negotiations with Parliament over their arrears, and in November 1647 Sir Thomas Fairfax ordered his regiment into London to seize money for paying the troops.

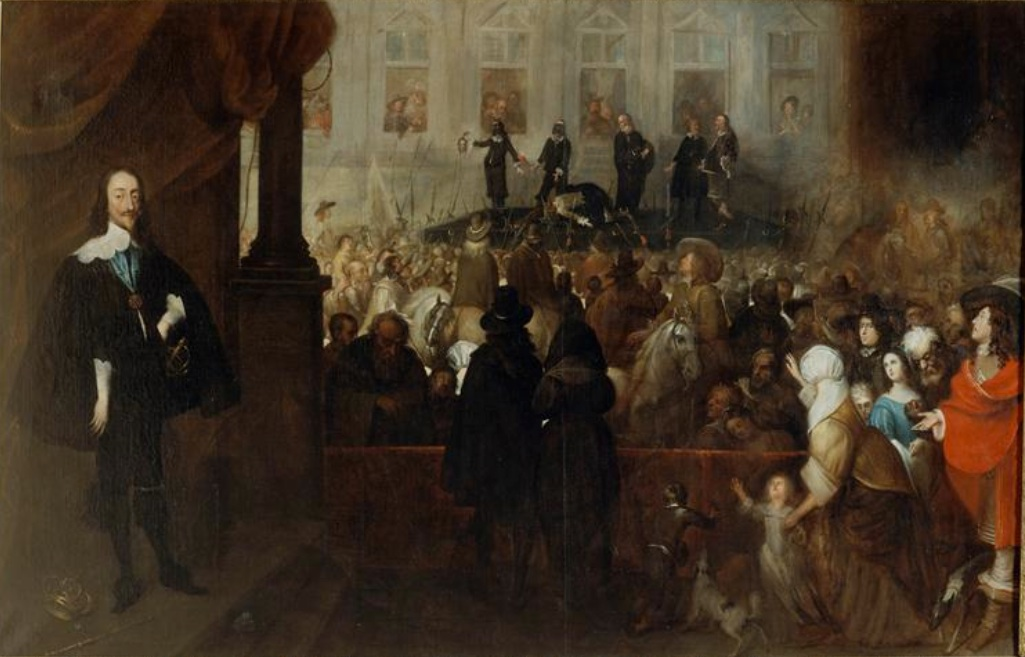
The Execution of Charles I, January 1649; soldiers from Hewson's regiment provided the security detail, while Hewson also allegedly supplied the executioner

When the Second English Civil War began in April 1648, Hewson helped suppress the rebellion in Kent, including the storming of Maidstone, where he was commended for his bravery. The renewed fighting convinced Cromwell and others that Charles must be removed, and Hewson played a prominent part in bringing this about. His regiment supported Pride's Purge of December 1648, where MPs who opposed putting the king on trial were forcibly excluded or arrested. In January 1649, he served on the court that approved the Execution of Charles I, signed the death warrant and reportedly sourced the headsman, while soldiers from his regiment under Daniel Axtell provided security during the trial and execution.

Despite his religious radicalism, Hewson was an authoritarian in matters of army discipline. When 300 men from his regiment refused in May 1649 to serve in the proposed Cromwellian Conquest of Ireland, they were swiftly dismissed, after which Hewson helped Cromwell crush the Banbury mutiny. In late August, he arrived in Ireland as part of Cromwell's expeditionary force and was present at the Siege of Drogheda, where he allegedly set fire to a church containing nearly 100 Irish and English Royalist refugees. Shortly afterwards, Hewson replaced Michael Jones as Governor of Dublin, then participated in the relief of Arklow and the Siege of Kilkenny in March 1650, where he lost an eye.

== The Interregnum and death ==
After the capture of Clonmel in May 1650, Cromwell returned to England, leaving Henry Ireton in charge of reducing the remaining pockets of organised Irish resistance. Hewson continued as Governor of Dublin, and joined the Gathered church founded there by John Rogers, a leading Fifth Monarchist preacher, putting him at odds with the majority of the Dublin Castle administration, who were either Presbyterians or members of the mainstream Protestant Church of Ireland. Recalled to London for consultations in 1652, he was nominated MP for Ireland in the 1653 Barebones Parliament; unlike many of his army colleagues, he supported its dissolution, and backed Cromwell's appointment as Lord Protector, albeit allegedly with great reluctance.

Returning to Ireland, Hewson was elected MP for County Dublin in the First Protectorate Parliament of 1654, but later fell out with Henry Cromwell, the new Lord Lieutenant of Ireland. Ordered back to England in 1656, he represented Guildford in the Second Protectorate Parliament, in which role he opposed Parliamentary moves to offer Cromwell the crown. In 1658, he was created Lord Hewson and took his place in Cromwell's Other House, a body equivalent to the House of Lords abolished in 1649. The Puritan Earl of Warwick reportedly refused to attend the House in protest at the elevation of a man with Hewson's low social origins.

Cromwell died in September 1658 and was succeeded as Lord Protector by his eldest son Richard. He proved incapable of controlling the competing factions within the New Model and Parliament, and resigned in May 1659, bringing the Protectorate to an end. The Rump Parliament dismissed in 1653 was reseated, and Hewson was appointed commander of the infantry in Ireland, but was back in London in October as a member of the Committee of Safety, set up by the army to assert its authority over Parliament. In December, the Council ordered Hewson to suppress demonstrations in London demanding a free Parliament, during which several people were killed. This destroyed their authority, and Hewson was cashiered, although he escaped further punishment.

By April 1660, the Stuart Restoration was imminent which meant regicides like Hewson were liable to arrest and execution; he escaped to Amsterdam in May, where he is thought to have died in 1662. However, this is not known for certain, while other sources claim he died in Rouen in 1663.

== Sources ==
- Anonymous (1906). "Colonel John Hewson, the Cromwellian". The Journal of the Royal Society of Antiquaries of Ireland. 36 (4): 429–432. JSTOR 25507569.
- Childs, Jesse (2022). The Siege of Loyalty House: A new history of the English Civil War. Bodley House. ISBN 978-1847923721.
- Durston, Christopher (2004). "Hewson, John, appointed Lord Hewson under the Protectorate(fl. 1630–1660)". Oxford Dictionary of National Biography (online ed.). Oxford University Press. doi:10.1093/ref:odnb/13157. (Subscription, Wikipedia Library access or UK public library membership required.)
- Firth, Charles (1891). "Hewson, John" . Dictionary of National Biography. Vol. 26. pp. 311–312.
- Gardiner, Samuel Rawson (1905). History of the Great Civil War, Volume IV. Longmans, Green & Co.
- Gentles, Ian (1992). The New Model Army in England, Ireland and Scotland, 1645-1653. Blackwell. ISBN 978-0631158691.
- Noble, Mark (1798). Lives of the English Regicides, Volume 1. G. G. J. and J. Robinson.
- Roberts, Stephen, K. "The Cromwell Association Online Directory of Parliamentarian Army Officers". British History Online; Surnames beginning "A".
- Roberts, Keith (2004). "Pickering, John (bap. 1615, d. 1645)". Oxford Dictionary of National Biography (online ed.). Oxford University Press. doi:10.1093/ref:odnb/22210. (Subscription, Wikipedia Library access or UK public library membership required.)
- Royle, Trevor (2004). Civil War: The Wars of the Three Kingdoms 1638–1660 (2006 ed.). Abacus. ISBN 978-0-349-11564-1.
- Wanklyn, Malcolm (2014). "Choosing Officers for the New Model Army, February to April 1645". Journal of the Society for Army Historical Research. 92 (370): 109–125. JSTOR 44232556.
- Wallis, Patrick (2019). Apprenticeship in England in Apprenticeship in Early Modern Europe. CUP. ISBN 978-1108690188.
- Wheeler, James Scott (1999). Cromwell in Ireland. Gill & Macmillan Ltd. ISBN 978-0-7171-2884-6.
