= Daniel Axtell =

Parliamentarian soldier, religious radical, and regicide

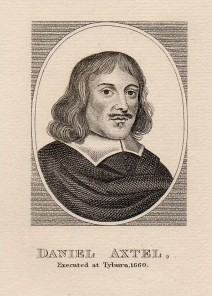
- Colonel Daniel Axtell

Member of Parliament for Counties of Carlow, Wexford, Kilkenny, and Queen's
- In office September 1654 – January 1655

Governor of Kilkenny
- In office March 1650 – November 1656

Personal details
- Born: 26 May 1622 (baptised) Great Berkhamsted, Hertfordshire
- Died: 19 October 1660 (aged 38) Tyburn, London
- Spouse(s): Dorothy, Elizabeth
- Children: William; Daniel (1640–1683)
- Occupation: Religious radical, regicide, and Parliamentarian soldier

Military service
- Rank: Colonel
- Battles/wars: Wars of the Three Kingdoms; Marston Moor; Second Newbury; Defence of Abingdon; Battle of Naseby; Bridgwater; Bristol 1645; Basing House; Siege of Exeter; Battle of Maidstone; Siege of Drogheda; Siege of Kilkenny; Battle of Meelick Island

Colonel Daniel Axtell, baptised 26 May 1622, executed 19 October 1660, was a religious radical from Hertfordshire, who served with the Parliamentarian army during the Wars of the Three Kingdoms. He was in charge of security during the trial of Charles I in January 1649, and as a result was excluded from the Act of Indemnity and Oblivion after the 1660 Stuart Restoration. As a regicide, he was executed for treason on 19 October 1660.

== Personal details ==
Daniel Axtell was baptized on 26 May 1622 in the Church of St Peter, Great Berkhamsted, Hertfordshire, probably the son of William Axtell (1587–1638), and his first wife Dorothy (1591–1628). He had a brother Thomas Axtell (1619-1646) who was an early immigrant in Sudbury, Massachusetts Bay Colony.

Sometime before 1640, he married Elizabeth and they had two sons; William and Daniel (1640–1683).

== Career ==
When his father died in May 1638, Daniel Axtell was apprenticed to the Worshipful Company of Grocers in London, where he became part of a community of Baptists, led by William Kiffin, many of whose members were other apprentices. This puts him at the centre of the religious and political conflict that dominated London before the outbreak of the First English Civil War in August 1642.

He participated as a lieutenant colonel in Pride's Purge of the Long Parliament (December 1648), arguably the only military coup d'état in English history, and commanded the Parliamentary Guard at the trial of King Charles I at Westminster Hall in 1649.

=== Axtell in Ireland ===
Axtell was a figure of some prominence in the Cromwellian conquest of Ireland. He played a role part in the storming of Drogheda and the massacre that ensued. After the town's walls and the internal earthworks had been successfully stormed, Arthur Aston, the Royalist governor of Drogheda, and others retreated to a citadel on Windmill Mount, which was heavily fortified and could not easily be taken by assault.

Colonel Axtell, with some twelve of his men, went up to the top of the mount, and demanded of the governor the surrender of it, who was very stubborn, speaking very big words, but at length was persuaded to go into the windmill at the top of the mount, and as many more of the chiefest of them as it could contain, where they were disarmed, and afterwards all slain.

— Letter in Perfect Diurnal, 1–8 October 1649.

It was on direct orders from Oliver Cromwell that the quarter that had been given to the defenders on Mill Mount by Axtell was overturned, and the unarmed prisoners were killed.

Granny Grannagh castle beside the River Nore is an imposing ruin. "In the civil wars" writes Grosse "it was strongly garrisoned for the King and commanded by Captain Butler, Colonel Axtell, the famous regicide who was governor of Kilkenny, dispatched a party to reduce it, but they returned without accomplishing their orders; upon which Axtell himself marched out with two cannon and summoned the castle to surrender on pain of military execution. Without any hope of relief it is no wonder the garrison submitted".

On 25 October 1650 Axtell led the Parliamentarian army to victory at the battle of Meelick Island (a Crannog on the Shannon, on which the Connaught Irish army was camped) after launching a sudden attack on the Irish army under cover of darkness. After fierce hand-to-hand fighting the Parliamentarians were victorious, killing several hundred of the Irish soldiers and capturing their weapons and equipment. After the conflict, however, it was alleged that many of the Irish had been killed after the promise of quarter. Axtell was court-martialled for this by Henry Ireton and sent back to England. It is possible that Axtell was a scapegoat; Cromwell had committed similar atrocities a year earlier at Drogheda and at Wexford, in the sense that no quarter had been offered. It is possible that the leaders of the Parliamentarian forces in Ireland (if not the Parliamentarian leadership in Britain) felt that the 'shock' tactics initially adopted in Ireland were counter-productive. For example, Ireton's request for lenient surrender terms to be made known by Parliament were refused. Axtell's actions may have run counter to a less ruthless strategy putatively adopted by Ireton in the field.

=== The Restoration and Execution ===
After the fall of the Protectorate in May 1659, Axtell returned briefly to Ireland as a colonel under the command of Edmund Ludlow but was sent back to England to support John Lambert against Booth's Uprising in August 1659. Axtell was among the veterans of the Good Old Cause who attempted to oppose the Restoration in April 1660. He escaped from the fight at Daventry, during which Lambert was captured by Colonel Richard Ingoldsby, but was himself arrested shortly afterwards.

He was arraigned for treason for his actions during the King's trial. His defence at his trial as a regicide, that he was only obeying orders at the trial of the King, was refuted by several witnesses who testified that Axtell had behaved discourteously towards the King, encouraging his men to jeer at or shout down the King when he tried to speak in his own defence. The court held: "[Axtell] justified all that he did was as a soldier, by the command of his superior officer, whom he must obey or die. It was... no excuse, for his superior was a traitor..., and where the command is traitorous, there the obedience to that command is also traitorous."

On 19 October 1660 Axtell was executed by being hanged, drawn and quartered at Tyburn and his head set up on Westminster Hall. His commanding officer Colonel Francis Hacker had also been condemned as a Regicide and had been executed. Axtell went to his execution unrepentant, declaring "If I had a thousand lives, I could lay them all down for the [Good Old] Cause". During Cromwell's Protectorate, he appropriated Berkhamsted Place' after his execution, the surveyor of Hertfordshire recommended that a new tenant and army officers were needed at Berkhamsted Place "to govern the people much seduced of late by new doctrine preacht unto them by Axtell and his colleagues."

In 1678 Axtell's son, also named Daniel Axtell, fled to Carolina after his house in Stoke Newington was searched for seditious libels. He died in 1687.
