= John Pickering (soldier) =

English member of the landed gentry

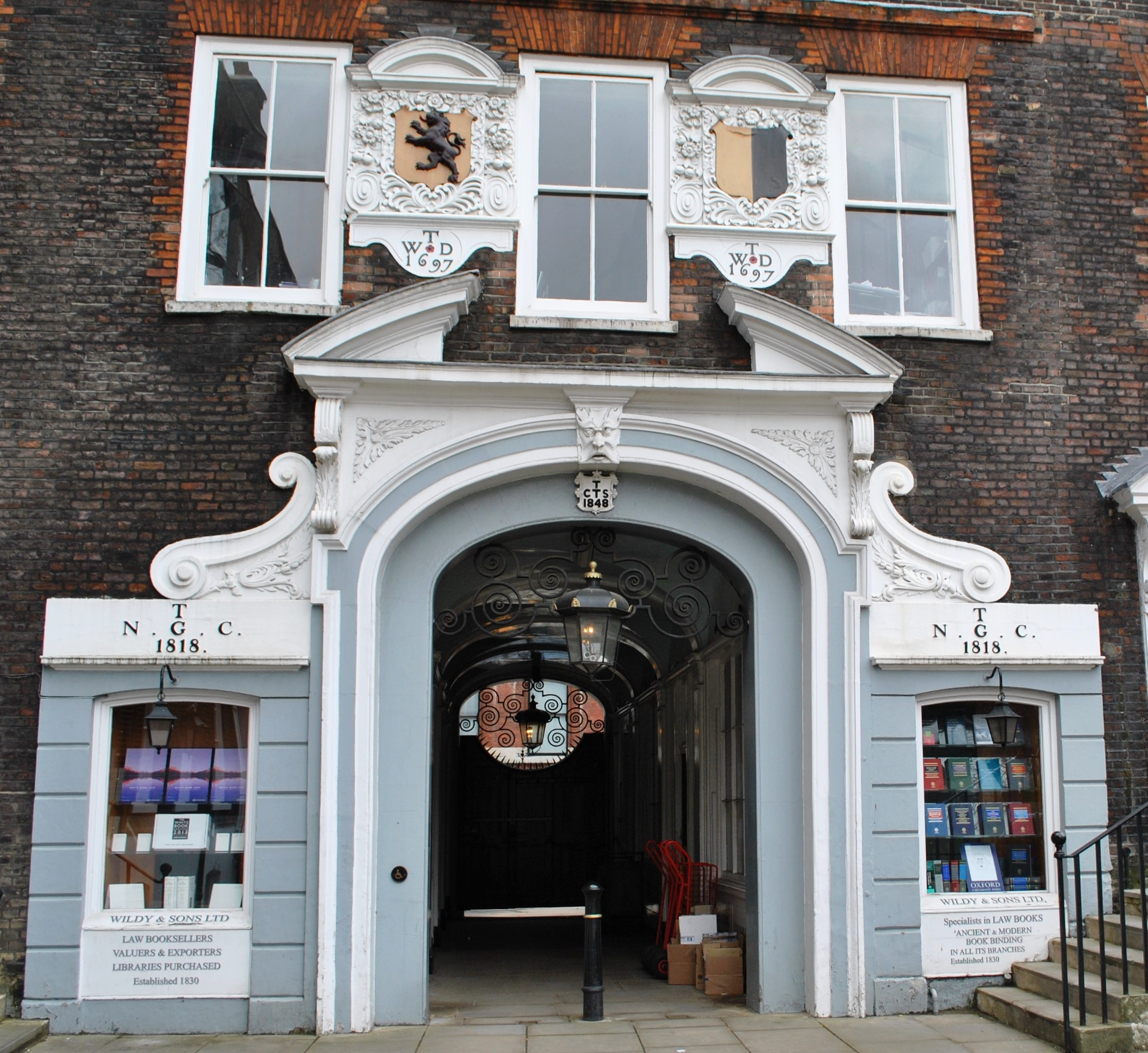
- Lincoln's Inn, where Pickering trained as a lawyer

Commissary-General, Army of the Eastern Association
- In office August 1643 – February 1644

Personal details
- Born: Titchmarsh, Northamptonshire, England
- Died: 24 November 1645 Ottery St Mary, England
- Cause of death: Typhus
- Resting place: Lyme Regis castle
- Education: St Catharine's College, Cambridge; Gray's Inn
- Occupation: Lawyer, soldier, and religious radical

Military service
- Allegiance: Parliamentarian
- Years of service: 1642 to 1645
- Rank: Colonel
- Battles/wars: Wars of the Three Kingdoms; Capture of Hillesden House; Marston Moor; Second Newbury; Defence of Abingdon; Battle of Naseby; Sherborne Castle; Lacock Abbey; Bridgwater; Bristol 1645; Basing House; Siege of Exeter

Colonel John Pickering (baptised 3 December 1615 – 24 November 1645) was a member of the landed gentry from Northamptonshire who served with the Parliamentarian army in the First English Civil War. Like his elder brother Sir Gilbert Pickering, a close ally of Oliver Cromwell, he was a religious Independent, known for his devout faith and radical views. Appointed colonel of an infantry regiment in the New Model Army, he died of fever at Ottery St Mary on 24 November 1645.

== Personal details ==
John Pickering, baptised 3 December 1615, was born in Titchmarsh, Northamptonshire, second son of Sir John Pickering (1585–1628), and Susannah Dryden (d.1661). The Pickering family were known to be devout Puritans, and Sir John was arrested in January 1627 for refusing to pay "loans" imposed by Charles I. Although released from prison a few months later due to illness, he died in January 1628.

Pickering's elder brother, Sir Gilbert (1611–1668), was MP for Northamptonshire from 1640 to 1659. Considered to be Oliver Cromwell's closest civilian ally, he sat on the English Council of State under The Protectorate, and was appointed Lord Chamberlain in 1655. Pickering also had a younger brother, Edward (1617–1698), and a sister Mary (1615–?); he never married, and does not appear to have had children.

== Career ==
Pickering attended Oundle School before entering St Catharine's College, Cambridge, then known for its Puritan teachings. He graduated in 1631, and in October 1634 began legal studies at Gray's Inn; prior to the outbreak of the First English Civil War in August 1642, he was employed by Parliament as diplomatic liaison with their Covenanter allies in Scotland, a role he continued into 1643.

In August 1643, he was appointed head of the Commissariat for the Army of the Eastern Association, before transferring to a troop of dragoons. In March 1644, he was wounded in an assault on Hillesden House led by Cromwell, and was rewarded by being made colonel of a new infantry regiment, which fought under the Earl of Manchester at Marston Moor in July, then Second Newbury in October. In the recriminations that followed alleged failures of command in both battles, Pickering was one of the witnesses on whom Cromwell relied in the attack that led to Manchester's removal under the Self-denying Ordinance.

In April 1645, Sir Thomas Fairfax nominated Pickering as colonel of one of twelve infantry regiments in the recently formed New Model Army, although the appointment was initially opposed by the House of Lords. Like other officers proposed by Cromwell and his associates, Pickering was a religious Independent, whose radicalism worried the moderate Presbyterians who dominated Parliament. They were particularly concerned by those like Pickering and his brother Sir Gilbert suspected of being Anabaptists, a sect viewed by many as subversive, and persecuted by both Catholics and mainstream Protestants as a result. The Lords replaced Pickering and all of his company commanders with officers from another regiment, before pressure from the House of Commons led them to approve the original list by one vote.

Pickering's war; key locations mentioned in text

While based at Abingdon-on-Thames over the winter of 1644 to 1645, the regiment suffered severe losses from disease and casualties incurred repulsing a Royalist attack in January 1645. Their numbers had to be made up by recruits from a unit previously led by the Presbyterian Colonel Thomas Ayloffe, and soon after Pickering formally assumed command, many of them mutinied. The alleged cause was objections to his preaching, although lack of pay may have been a contributory factor, and Parliament responded with an Ordinance that restricted preaching to authorised chaplains only.

Despite this inauspicious beginning, the unit was seen as particularly close to Cromwell, and was described as one of the 'chiefest praying and preaching regiments in the army'. Apart from Pickering, his officers included the Leveller John Jubbes, as well as John Hewson and Daniel Axtell, Anabaptist sympathisers who became Regicides of Charles I in January 1649. The regiment fought at Naseby, then took part in the 1645 autumn offensive against Royalist strongholds in South West England, including the capture of Sherborne Castle, Lacock Abbey, Bridgwater, Bristol and Basing House. Pickering fell ill during the siege of Exeter, probably with typhus, and died at Ottery St Mary on 24 November 1645. At the request of his brother Gilbert, he was buried in Lyme Regis castle, with John Hewson taking over as colonel.

== Legacy ==
"John Pickering's Regiment of Foote" forms part of the modern Sealed Knot society, an Historical reenactment group dedicated to the English Civil War.

== Sources ==
- Childs, Jesse (2022). The Siege of Loyalty House: A new history of the English Civil War. Bodley House. ISBN 978-1847923721.
- Durston, Christopher (2004). "Hewson, John, appointed Lord Hewson under the Protectorate(fl. 1630–1660)". Oxford Dictionary of National Biography (online ed.). Oxford University Press. doi:10.1093/ref:odnb/13157. (Subscription, Wikipedia Library access or UK public library membership required.)
- Firth, Charles; Raitt, R.S (1911). Acts and Ordinances of the Interregnum, 1642-1660. HMSO.
- Gentles, Ian (1992). The New Model Army in England, Ireland and Scotland, 1645-1653. Blackwell. ISBN 978-0631158691.
- Hamilton, W.D, ed. (1890). Calendar of State Papers Domestic: Charles I, 1644-1645, Volume 503, November to December 1644. HMSO.
- Jones, William R (2010). A History of St Catharine's College, Cambridge. CUP. ISBN 978-1108008969.
- Moseley, Virginia; Sgroi, Rosemary (2010). PICKERING, Sir John (1585-1628), of Titchmarsh, Northants in The History of Parliament: the House of Commons 1604–1629. CUP. ISBN 978-1107002258.
- Roberts, Keith (2004). "Pickering, John (bap. 1615, d. 1645)". Oxford Dictionary of National Biography (online ed.). Oxford University Press. doi:10.1093/ref:odnb/22210. (Subscription, Wikipedia Library access or UK public library membership required.)
- Vennings, Keith (2004). "Pickering, Sir Gilbert, first baronet, appointed Lord Pickering under the Protectorate (1611-1668)". Oxford Dictionary of National Biography (online ed.). Oxford University Press. doi:10.1093/ref:odnb/22207. (Subscription, Wikipedia Library access or UK public library membership required.)
- Wanklyn, Malcolm (2014). "Choosing Officers for the New Model Army, February to April 1645". Journal of the Society for Army Historical Research. 92 (370): 109–125. JSTOR 44232556.
- Worden, Blair (2012). God's Instruments: Political Conduct in the England of Oliver Cromwell. OUP. ISBN 978-0199570492.
