= Good Old Cause =

English Civil War term

The Good Old Cause was the name given, retrospectively, by the soldiers of the New Model Army, to the complex of reasons that motivated their fight on behalf of the Parliament of England.

Their struggle was against King Charles I and the Royalists during the English Civil War; they continued to support the English Commonwealth between 1649 and 1660. Oliver Cromwell wrote, in a letter to Sir William Spring in 1643, of the archetypal plain, russet-coated captain who embodies the ideal of republican soldiery (many of those who supported the Good Old Cause were also Independents who advocated local congregational control of religious and church matters).

== 1659–1660 ==
Those who disagreed with expedient political compromises made during the period of the Protectorate, went back to the Army's own declarations during the wars: to republican pamphlets like those produced by John Lilburne, Marchamont Nedham and John Milton. With their discontent, they imagined that there had been a moment of revolutionary purity when all these writers had agreed on something intrinsically republican and good, this entity – shifting depending upon the writer – was often labelled the "Good Old Cause".

After the death of Oliver Cromwell the phrase came into use gradually, passing to and fro in documents and speeches. By April 1659 and for months afterwards it was frequently heard in general discourse and every second or third pamphlet in the booksellers' shops had "The Good Old Cause" on its title-page or running through its text.

The phrase was open to interpretation, but in 1659 to its exponents it meant the pure Republican constitution which had been founded on the Regicide and which lasted until Cromwell's dissolution of the Rump Parliament on 20 April 1653. It proclaimed that Cromwell's interim dictatorship and Protectorate had been an interruption of the natural course of things, dexterously leaving it an open question whether that interruption had been necessary or justifiable, but calling on all men, now that Cromwell was dead and his effectiveness gone with him, to regard his rule as exceptional and extraordinary, and to revert to the old Commonwealth.

In April 1660 General John Lambert tried to raise an army against the restoration of The Crown in favour of the Commonwealth by issuing a proclamation calling on all supporters of the "Good Old Cause" to rally on the battlefield of Edgehill, but he was arrested before arriving at the old battlefield and gathering enough forces to threaten General George Monck, the power behind the restoration movement. In October the same year Daniel Axtell, the officer who had commanded the guard during the Trial of Charles I, went to his execution unrepentant declaring that "If I had a thousand lives, I could lay them all down for the [Good Old] Cause". (Note: When asked what he meant by the Cause, Axtell replied "I mean that Cause which we were encouraged to, and engaged in under the parliament, which was for common right and freedom, and against the Surplice and Common-Prayer Book: and I tell you, that Surplice and Common-Prayer Book shall not stand long in England, for it is - not of God" (Howell & Cobbett 1816, p. 1259)) Similarly, Algernon Sidney, before his execution for allegedly being involved in the Rye House Plot in 1683, thanked God for allowing him to die "for that [Good] Old Cause in which I was from my youth engaged".

== Later influence ==
The revolution did not perish in 1660, but lived on in the words and deeds of the host of soldiers and sailors, officers and men, sectaries and republicans who found the Restoration regime wanting ... No amount of penal legislation could eradicate dissent from the restored church, nor did the return of the Cromwellian officers and men to their traditional occupations quench their thirst for a government more responsive to their needs and aspirations. Some in fact, frankly expressed their willingness to take up arms again... for the Good Old Cause, but they never rebelled together.

— Richard Greaves.

The "Good Old Cause" became, in the hands of radicals in the 18th and 19th centuries, one of the main supports to agitation within England by linking their cause to the cause of the English Civil War radicals. This memory was sustained by the publication of various tracts about the civil war across the 18th Century — Edmund Ludlow's Memoirs in 1701 by John Toland for instance that sought to radicalise the memory of the English Civil War.

Work on the republican imagination includes Jonathan Scott on Algernon Sydney and seventeenth-century republicanism, Nigel Smith on the radical John Streater, and Blair Worden on the memory of the Civil Wars.

== See also ==
- Green Ribbon Club
- Norman Yoke
- Republicanism in the United Kingdom
