= Edmund Verney (soldier) =

English soldier

Sir Edmund Verney (1616 – 11 September 1649) was an English soldier who fought on the Royalist side during the English Civil War.

== Education ==
Verney was born in 1616, was third son of Sir Edmund Verney and his wife, Margaret (died 1641), daughter of Sir Thomas Denton of Hillesden. Edmund was educated at a private school at Gloucester, at Winchester College (1634), and then at Magdalen Hall, Oxford, where he matriculated on 22 January 1636, learnt little and got into debt and into disgrace with his tutor, Henry Wilkinson. Thence he was removed to the care of Mr. Crowther, rector of Newton Blossomville, formerly his elder brother Ralph's Oxford tutor, who found him "devoid of the first grounds of logicke or other University learning", but "willing and capable".

== Military service ==
Verney entered the army as a volunteer in 1639, joined his father in the army of King Charles I on the Scottish border, and from that time proved himself a first-rate soldier, enduring hardships cheerfully, and winning the confidence of his men. With the first money he earned he paid off his Oxford creditors, and, when the First Bishops' War with Scotland was over, joined the army of the states in Flanders in Sir Thomas Culpepper's company. In winter quarters at Utrecht he studied Latin, French, and history seven or eight hours a day at the university, and did much to repair the time wasted at Oxford. He had many disappointments about promotion, though Elizabeth, Queen of Bohemia (sister of Charles I) did her best to help him. In 1640 he served again in the English army against the Scots in the Second Bishops' War.

Verney sided with the king in the civil war, and suffered heavily for his loyalty; his pay as well as that of his men was constantly in arrears; the grief of his father's death at the Battle of Edgehill was embittered by the sorrow and indignation he felt that his eldest brother, Ralph, should support the Parliamentary cause; his portion invested in the aulnage was practically forfeited, and he suffered most of all from the mistakes he witnessed daily in the conduct of his own leaders.

In 1642 Verney served with James, Duke of Ormonde in Ireland, during the Irish Confederate Wars in the savage fighting against unarmed and untrained peasants. "Nobler spirit never was", wrote S.R. Gardiner in his History of England, "than that of Edmund Verney, a younger son of Charles's knight-marshal, yet even his temper was lowered by the element in which he worked". "The enemy runs from us wheresoever we meet them", he writes, "but if we chance to overtake them, we give no quarter, but put all to the sword". He sent the same report after the taking of Trim; he saw much fighting, and was wounded at the Battle of Rathconnell. He was knighted in 1644, and made lieutenant-governor of Chester; he served during the two sieges, and was highly valued by Lord Byron and other commanders. After the surrender of Chester, Sir Edmund rejoined Ormonde, to whom he was devotedly attached; and their portraits were painted in Paris by Justus van Egmont in 1648. (Note: In 1899, his portrait (a head) in oils, by Egmont, was at Claydon House.) They returned to Ireland to take part in the last fierce struggle against Cromwell. Sir Edmund had previously been reconciled with his brother.

== Death ==
Ormonde committed the command of his own regiment to his friend, when he sent the flower of his army with Sir Arthur Aston to reinforce the defenders of Drogheda. Sir Edmund wrote thence (9 September 1649) earnestly begging Ormonde to fall on the enemy's camp to make a diversion. He survived the horrors of the assault and Cromwell's massacre of the inhabitants, but the few who had escaped were "sought out and killed in cold blood". Among these was Verney, who was enticed, even from the presence of Cromwell, by a certain Roper, who then "ran him thro' with a tuck".

== In fiction ==
Verney has a love affair (unconsummated) with Mary Powell, before she becomes the first wife of the poet John Milton, in the historical novel by Robert Graves, Wife to Mr. Milton. It is unclear whether Graves had any factual evidence on which to base this part of his story.
