= Siege of Reading =

Eleven-day blockade of Reading, Berkshire 1643

Coordinates: 51.4572°N 0.9665°W

- Part of First English Civil War
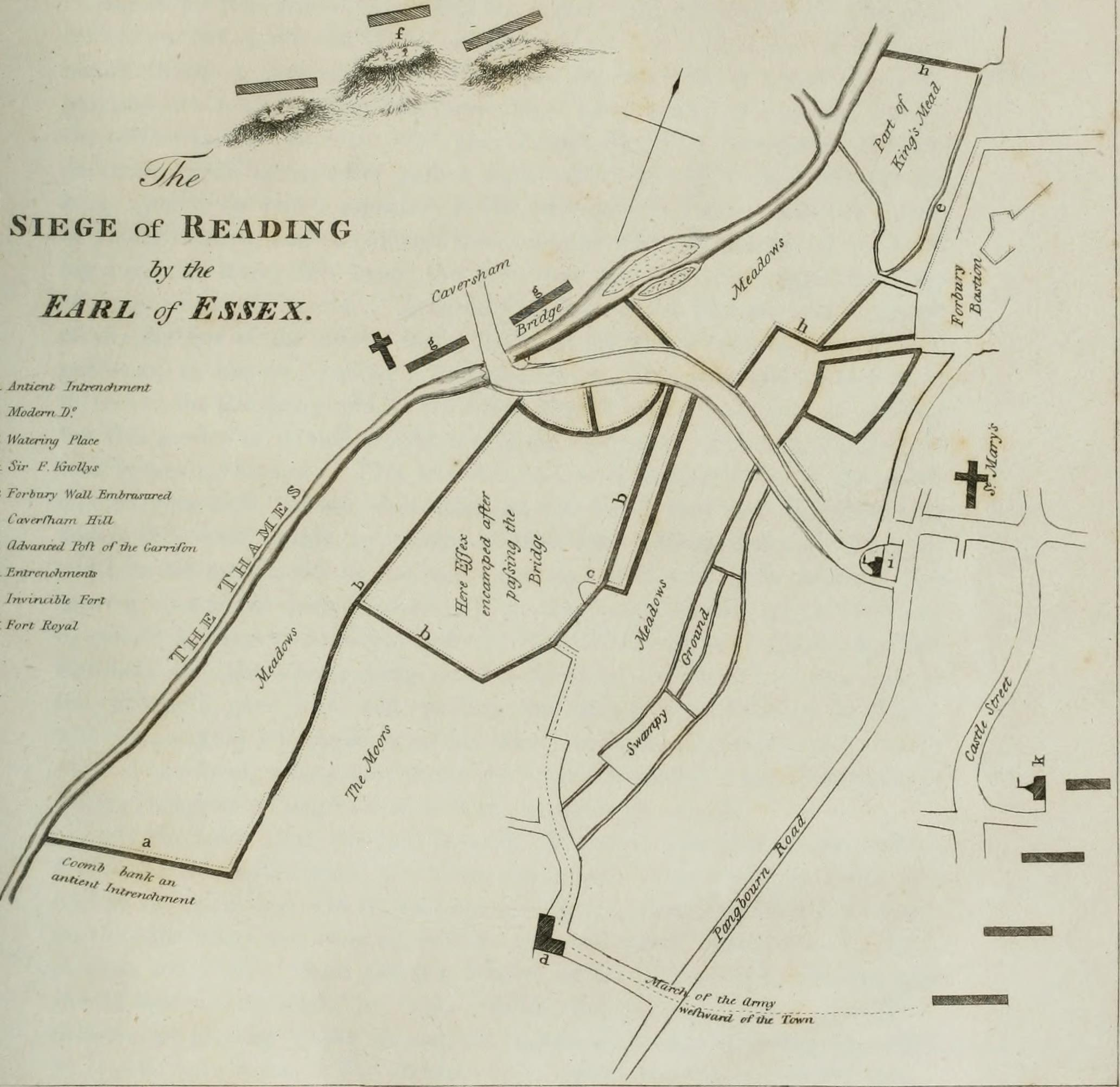
- Map of the siege published in 1816
Date	14–25 April 1643
Location	Reading, Berkshire
Result	Parliamentarian victory

Belligerents
Royalists	Parliamentarians

Commanders and leaders
Sir Arthur Aston; Richard Feilding	Earl of Essex

Strength
c. 3,300	c. 19,000

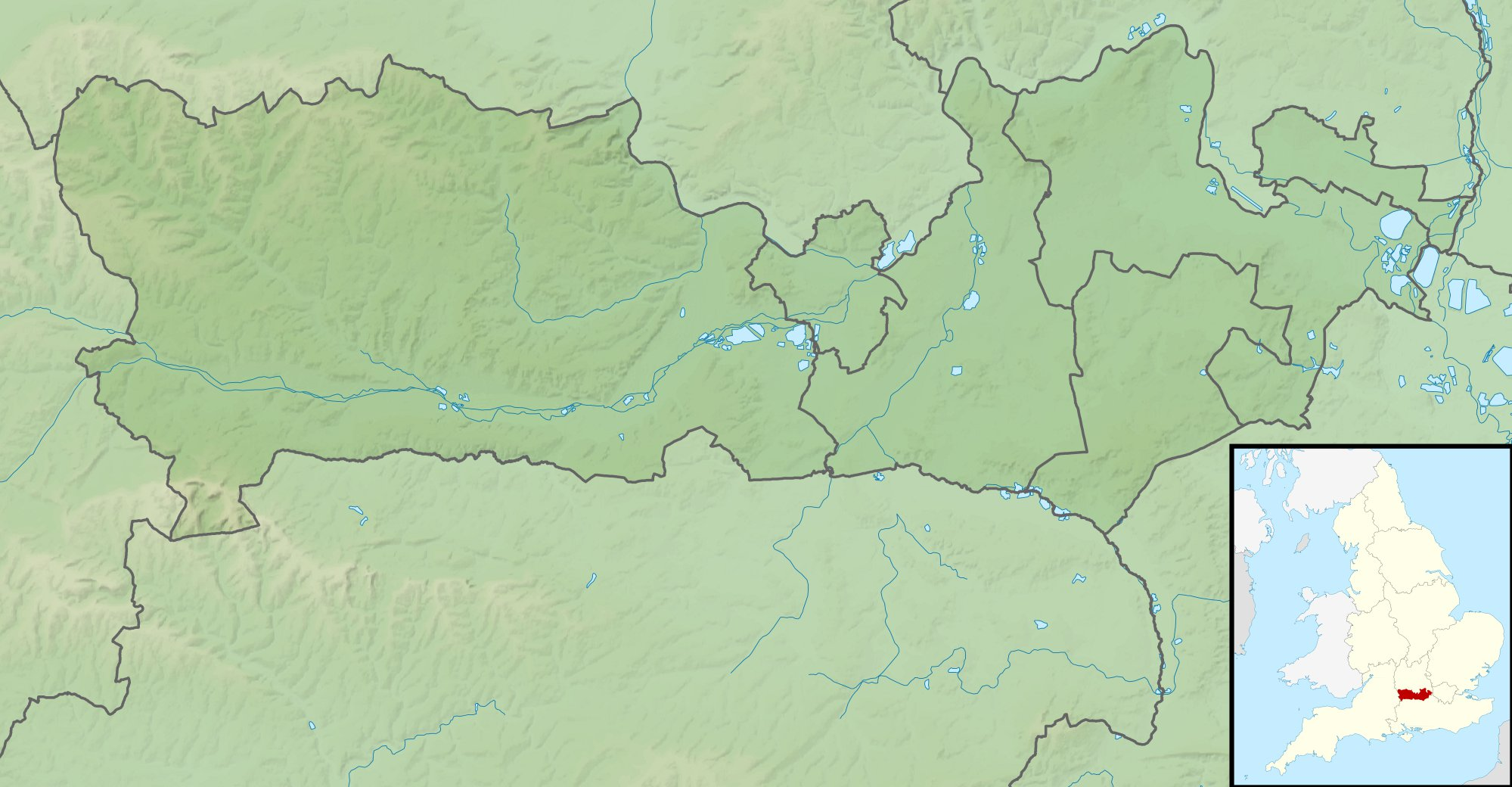
Berkshire and Reading

The siege of Reading was an eleven-day blockade of Reading, Berkshire during the First English Civil War. Reading had been garrisoned by 3,000 Royalist troops under Sir Arthur Aston in November 1642. On 14 April 1643, Robert Devereux, 3rd Earl of Essex led a Parliamentarian army of 19,000 troops to lay siege to the town, and began bombarding it two days later.

During the siege, Aston was wounded and command of the garrison passed to Richard Feilding. On 25 April, Feilding requested a truce in order to negotiate the town's surrender. Despite a Royalist relief force commanded by Charles I of England and Prince Rupert of the Rhine arriving the following day, Feilding held to the truce, and Essex's army was able to repel the relief army. The surrender terms were agreed on 26 April, and the next day the Royalists left the town for Oxford.

== Background ==
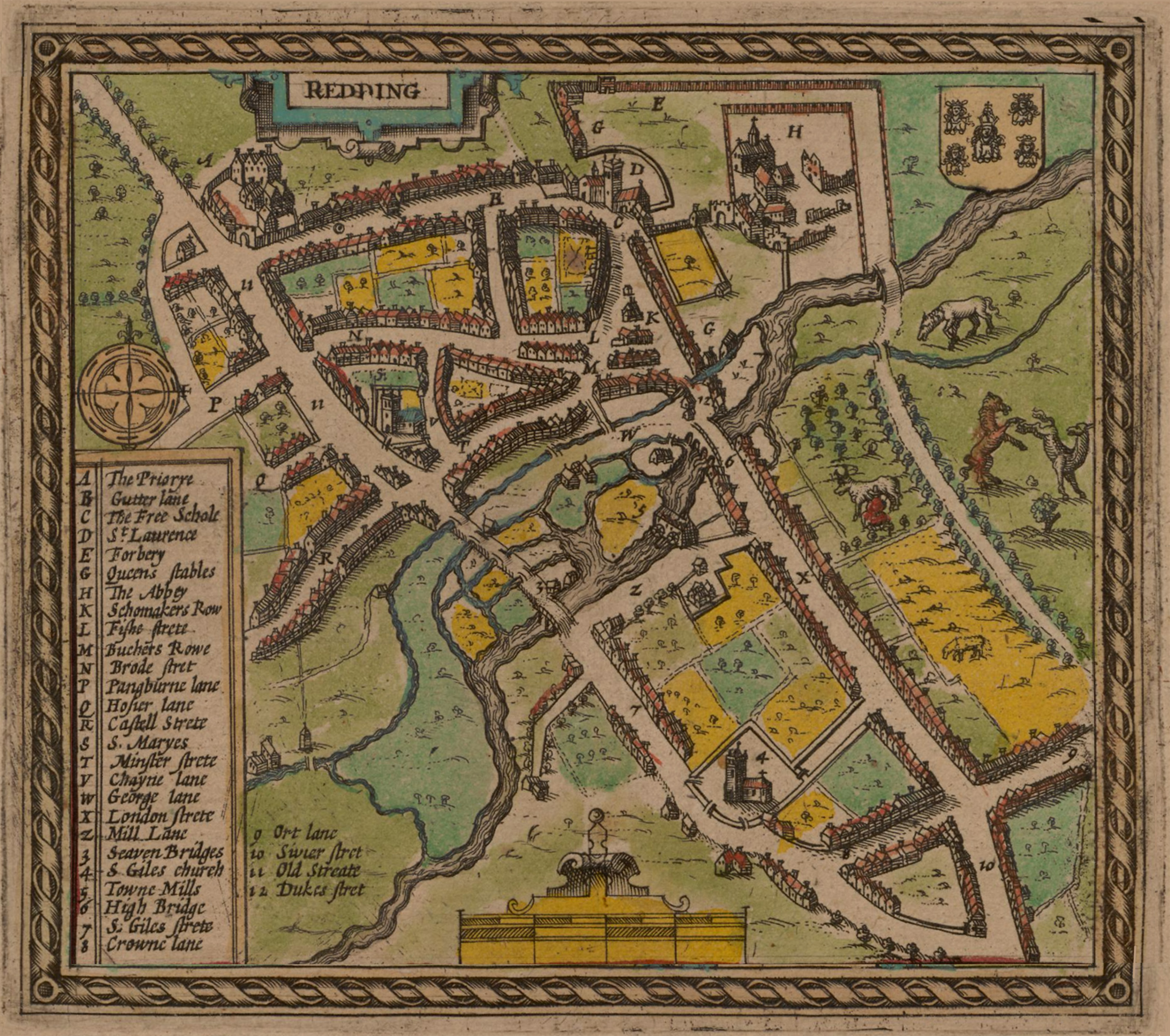
A map of Reading from 1611

In August 1642, King Charles I raised his royal standard in Nottingham and declared the Earl of Essex, and by extension Parliament, to be traitors, marking the start of the First English Civil War. That action had been the culmination of religious, fiscal and legislative tensions going back over fifty years.

In October 1642, King Charles returned to Oxford from the indecisive Battle of Edgehill. He then proceeded cautiously towards London, going via Reading. After being repelled from London, he retired back through Reading, where he left a Royalist garrison of 2,000 soldiers under Sir Arthur Aston, who was appointed as governor. Aston was unimpressed with the soldiers available to him, writing to Prince Rupert that he "could never have a greater affliction light on me than to be put in command of them".

Reading, located on the main route between London and Oxford, was strategically significant both due to its location as a 'frontier' between these two military strongholds, and the fact that it was located at a crossing point of the River Thames. Prior to the war, the town had minimal defences, and Aston realised that to have any chance of holding the town, these needed to be improved. Over the winter months, Aston oversaw the creation of a defensive line; a ditch with a raised earthen rampart linking a series of bastions. This form of fortification was known as a "continuous bastioned enceinte", and was common for Royalist defences during the Civil War. The ramparts were topped with stone from Reading Abbey, where they destroyed the church's nave specifically for the purpose. For the construction of the defences, Aston forced civilians from the town to work alongside his soldiers, and was described by Basil Morgan, his biographer in the Oxford Dictionary of National Biography, as "bullying his soldiers and the citizenry alike". Aston maintained strict discipline over his troops, and had several hanged for not meeting his standards.

Aside from the forced labour, the Royalist garrison presented other difficulties for the town: at the time Reading had a population of around 5,000, upon which space had to be found to house the 2,000 Royalist soldiers. Furthermore, the building of the fortifications and the army's expenses were charged to the town. Amongst these expenses were Aston's salary, which was so large that he loaned money back to the town with interest. In Stuart Hylton's 2017 A–Z of Reading: Places–People–History, he claims that: "In any list of unpopular figures in Reading's history, Sir Arthur Aston... must surely feature near the top."

== Prelude ==
In January 1643, the Parliamentarians learnt that Reading was poorly defended, so John Hampden and John Urry led a small force across the Chiltern Hills to scout the town. They only managed to get as far as the River Kennet, which they were unable to cross as it was so swollen.

Over the winter, there were growing calls for peace, particularly on the Parliamentary side, and a compromise was presented to King Charles at Oxford in February 1643. Although the proposals were far less demanding than previously made by parliament, the King was unconvinced and responded with demands of his own for the return of his income and military assets. Further discussion ensued, in which the King demanded more and more, and in early April parliament withdrew from the negotiation process.

== Siege ==
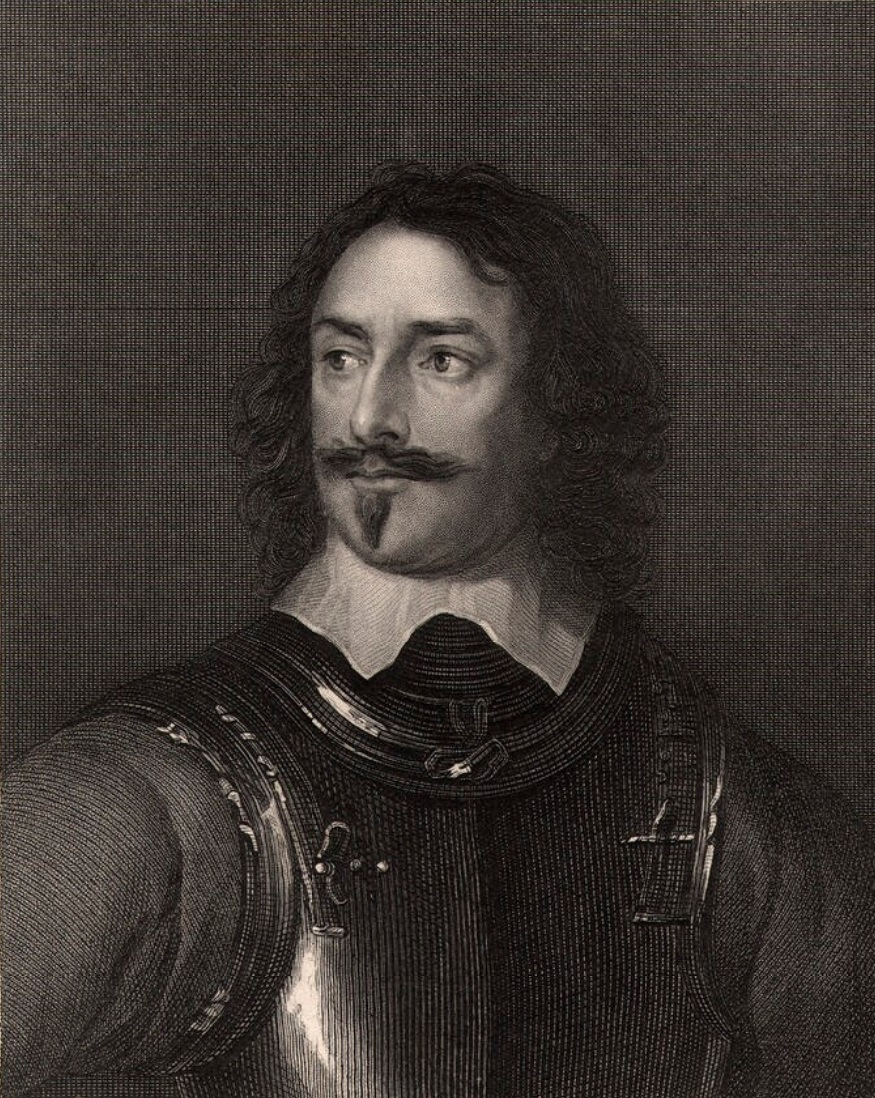
The Parliamentarian army that besieged Reading was led by the Earl of Essex.

The Earl of Essex, commander-in-chief of the Parliamentarian army, marched an army of over 19,000 men (16,000 foot soldiers, 3,000 cavalry plus artillery) from Windsor, and arrived at Reading on 14 April. Essex bluffed the Reading garrison, making as though to continue onto Oxford, before he established his army to the south and west of the town, where the defensive works were the weakest, and captured Caversham Bridge, cutting Reading off from the main Royalist forces in Oxford. The Parliamentarians held a council of war, in which Essex sought advice on whether to attempt to storm the town, or to be more cautious and lay siege to it. While the cavalry officers favoured an aggressive approach, the infantry commanders preferred the more cautious path. Essex agreed to be cautious, aware that he could not afford to lose many men, as he would need them for his planned subsequent attack on Oxford. Essex demanded that the town surrender, and in response, Aston said that he would rather "starve and die" than give up Reading. Accordingly, the Parliamentarians blockaded Reading, and Essex established his headquarters in Southcote.

By 16 April, the Parliamentarians had set up their artillery, and began to bombard the town. Two days later, around 700 Royalist musketeers commanded by Lieutenant General Wilmot managed to reinforce Reading via Sonning, to the east of the town. The blockade was subsequently tightened, surrounding the town on all sides. During the bombardment, falling debris struck Aston and apparently rendered him unable to speak. The Royalist historian, Edward Hyde, 1st Earl of Clarendon suggested that the affliction might not have been genuine, but rather a way of maintaining his reputation in a lost cause. Command of the garrison passed to Aston's second-in-command, Colonel Richard Feilding, on the basis that he was the most senior of Aston's colonels.

On the morning of 25 April, Feilding displayed a white flag from the town walls, and established a truce in which to negotiate the town's surrender. The same day, a relief force commanded by King Charles and Prince Rupert attacked the Parliamentarian army at Caversham Bridge, but Feilding held to the truce, and the garrison did not join the battle. Feilding was pressured by some of his officers to break the truce and aid the relief force, but he refused, saying that it would be dishonourable, and that he would refuse, even "if the king himself should come and knock at the gate, and command him to do it." Essex's army was able to repel the attack, and the relief force retreated. Feilding negotiated generous terms of surrender; he and his men were granted safe passage to Oxford with flying colours. On 27 April the Royalist soldiers marched from the town to Oxford; despite the promise of safe passage, some of the Royalist soldiers were robbed and disarmed, though Essex had tried to prevent such action by promising his men a reward. According to Morgan, Aston regained his ability to speak during the journey.

== Aftermath ==
On 29 April, two days after leaving Reading, Feilding was court-martialled; charged with "several foul suspicious passages". At this early stage of the war, siege warfare in Britain was largely ineffective; methods that had been developed and refined in the European wars were applied without the skill and experience required. This led to additional suspicion being placed on commanders who surrendered while under siege. Feilding's trial lasted for two days, after which he was found guilty and sentenced to death. He was reprieved twice on the scaffold before the intervention of Prince Rupert led the King to pardon him. Despite his pardon, Feilding was still stripped of his regiment and position, and thereafter had to fight as a volunteer.

The capture of Reading meant the Parliamentarians could challenge Oxford directly, but Essex and William Waller were unable to coordinate their forces for an attack. Reading was held by the Parliamentarians until October, when they evacuated the town and it was retaken by the Royalists, but they in turn evacuated in the face of a Parliamentarian army the following May, and the town remained in the hands of Parliament for the remainder of the war.
