= The Story of Marie Powell: Wife to Mr. Milton =

1943 historical novel

First edition (publ. Cassell)

The Story of Marie Powell: Wife to Mr. Milton is a 1943 historical novel by Robert Graves. It is based on the life of the young wife of poet John Milton. Graves tells it from her viewpoint and paints an unflattering portrait of Milton.

In addition to Milton and Marie, real historical characters included in the story include Edmund Verney, who is depicted as Marie's true love.

== Reception ==
Summarising the novel for the Carcanet edition, Simon Brittan wrote that:

"Graves regards [Milton] as one of the heinous monsters in the English poetic pantheon. Certainly his Mrs Milton is ill-used by a distended genius. Milton's first wife was sixteen when they married. Milton was after her dowry and when it did not follow he proved a domineering prig, unresponsive to her sensuousness or her down-to-earth wit. It was a spiritual misalliance, too: her Catholicism sorted ill with his beliefs. The dramatic political and military events of the English civil war touch her life at every point, and we witness the execution of Charles I close up. The depiction of everyday life at the time and the merciless portrait of the young Milton, are spell-binding."

Geoffrey Wall concluded that Graves's Wife to Mr. Milton is "a relentlessly effective satire on masculine self-regard." Matthew Adams has recently written, "Ignoring the question of whether Milton had justly or unjustly been defamed, E.M. Forster pronounced Wife to Mr Milton a thumping good read yet remained concerned that Graves's portrait had depicted only half of the man, [... ]' It has been noted that the English poet W.H. Auden liked to quote from Graves's Wife to Mr. Milton: "They tune the strings a little sharper at Cambridge."

On a harsher note, James Macleod Sandison has reprimanded Graves's account of Milton: "Before leaving the anti-Miltonists, I feel compelled to deplore Robert Graves' Wife to Mr. Milton: it is an unfortunate book which might do much to deepen the erroneous impression of Milton as a surly and narrow-minded puritan."

In Graves's defence, Ian McCormick has argued that "The satiric reduction is a necessary one, for it appears to be part of a larger uneasiness in the text concerning the self-aggrandizement of the reasoning subject that might result in the straitjacket of the purely systematic or, at worst, the totalitarian ideologies of the modern period." This novel therefore shares a characteristic that McCormick has also identified in Graves's Antigua, Penny, Puce: "Ultimately, Graves aetheticises history, politics and gender. There is a sportive element at work in his fiction which resists a permanent anchor."

The novel was republished in 2003 as part of the 'Millennium Graves' edition. More recently, Penguin Classics published another edition of Graves' Wife to Mr Milton in 2012.
