= Arthur Aston (army officer) =

English Army officer

Sir Arthur Aston
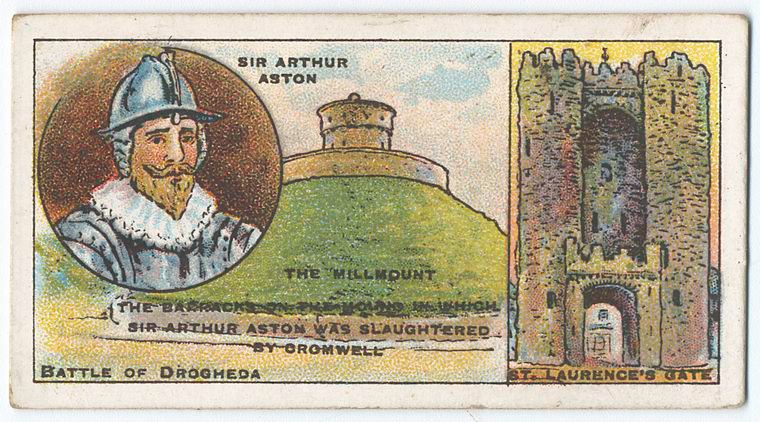
- A 19th century cigarette card of Arthur Aston
- Born: 1590
- Died: 1649 (aged 58–59)
- Military career
- Conflicts: Cromwellian conquest of Ireland; Siege of Drogheda (executed)

Sir Arthur Aston (1590–1649) was a soldier, most noted for his support for King Charles I in the English Civil War, and in folklore for the gruesome manner of his death in Ireland. He was from a prominent Roman Catholic family originating in Cheshire. He was killed during the Siege of Drogheda in September 1649 during the Cromwellian Conquest of Ireland.

== Early career in central Europe ==
Aston was the son of another Sir Arthur Aston, of Fulham, Middlesex, and the grandson of Sir Thomas Aston of Aston in Bucklow Hundred, Cheshire.

Aston's father was a professional soldier who had served in Russia in the 1610s, and, being a Catholic, had caught the attention and trust of the Polish king Sigismund III. Arthur Aston senior agreed to raise 2,000 British mercenaries for the Polish crown for the Turkish war of 1621. Though most of these mercenaries bound for Poland were turned back by Protestant Denmark in the Denmark Straits, Captain Arthur Aston Junior successfully landed about 300 British and Irish men of his father's levies in Poland in 1621. These troops later formed a guard for the King of Poland. Arthur Aston Senior died in 1624. Aston advanced to the rank of Major by 1627, and saw considerable service during the Polish-Swedish wars. He was captured by Swedish troops near Danzig in 1627.

After the Truce of Altmark of 1629, Aston left Poland for the service of Sweden and was commissioned by Gustavus Adolphus of Sweden to raise an English regiment in 1631. His unit was shipped from Britain in 1632, but fought in the secondary theatres of Germany, never attaining the fame of Scots units such as Mackay's Regiment. Its strength had fallen so much, mostly due to sickness, that by 1634 Aston was recruiting Germans to fill the ranks.

== Career in the English Civil War ==
By 1640, Aston had returned to Britain, and he commanded a regiment for King Charles during the Second Bishops' War. There was uneasiness in many quarters about his religion, and he was forced to resign his command, although he received a knighthood for his services.

In 1642, when the First English Civil War broke out, Charles initially refused to employ him on account of his Catholic faith, but Prince Rupert of the Rhine persuaded him to do so. To counter anti-Catholic propaganda, Edward Hyde claimed that Aston was the only officer in the King's army who was a Papist, "if he were one", although at least six other officers of the rank of Colonel or above were also known to be Catholics. Aston was employed as Colonel General of Dragoons, and served in this capacity during the Edgehill campaign.

When Charles made Oxford his wartime capital, Aston was made commander of an outpost at Reading, where he became unpopular through his authoritarian methods. He was wounded when Reading was besieged (struck on the head by a falling tile), and was captured by the Parliamentarians under the Earl of Essex. He was released by prisoner exchange and became Sergeant-Major General of Horse to Prince Rupert. He fought at the Storming of Bristol and the First Battle of Newbury.

Aston became governor of Oxford in late 1643 and again made himself unpopular, until he lost a leg as a result of a fall from a horse at Horspath in September 1644 and was relieved as governor. He received a large pension from the King, but did not hold any appointments during the rest of the First English Civil War.

In 1648, Aston joined the Earl of Ormonde, who had recently been made Commander-in-Chief of the Irish Confederates and other Royalist forces in Ireland. (The above is incorrect. Aston was in Ireland, with Ormonde, in January 1647, when he petitioned the House of Lords for a pass to return to England, or to go beyond 'these Dominions'. The Lords refused a pass to return to England, but issued one to go beyond 'these Dominions'. In truth, Aston should not have been in Ireland in 1649.) Ref: House of Lords Journal January 1647.

He was made governor of the vital port of Drogheda. Drogheda was a Protestant town in The Pale and had previously supported Parliament through two sieges by Irish Confederates.

In 1649, Oliver Cromwell laid siege to Drogheda. The siege ended on 11 September, when Cromwell's forces stormed the town. Cromwell's troops were ordered to show no quarter to any man bearing arms; in Cromwell's words, in the heat of the action, "I forbade them to spare any that were in arms in the town...", and many of the defenders were killed by the victorious Parliamentarian soldiers. Aston and other English Royalists retreated to the defensible Millmount Fort. They eventually agreed to surrender after a parley on the bridge, but were massacred after they laid down their arms. It is widely believed that the Parliamentarian soldiers killed Aston by bashing his brains out with his own wooden leg, which they believed concealed gold coins.

Aston was said to have been made a Doctor of Physics in 1644, and had a daughter, Elizabeth Thomson alias Aston

== Sources ==
- Reilly, Tom (1999). Cromwell, An Honourable Enemy (London: Phoenix Press); ISBN 1-84212-080-8
- Barrès-Baker, Malcolm (2004). The Siege of Reading: The Failure of the Earl of Essex's 1643 Spring Offensive (Ottawa, EbooksLib); ISBN 1-55449-999-2
