= Siege of Kilkenny =

Siege during the Cromwellian conquest of Ireland

Coordinates: 52.6477°N 7.2561°W

- Part of the Cromwellian Conquest of Ireland
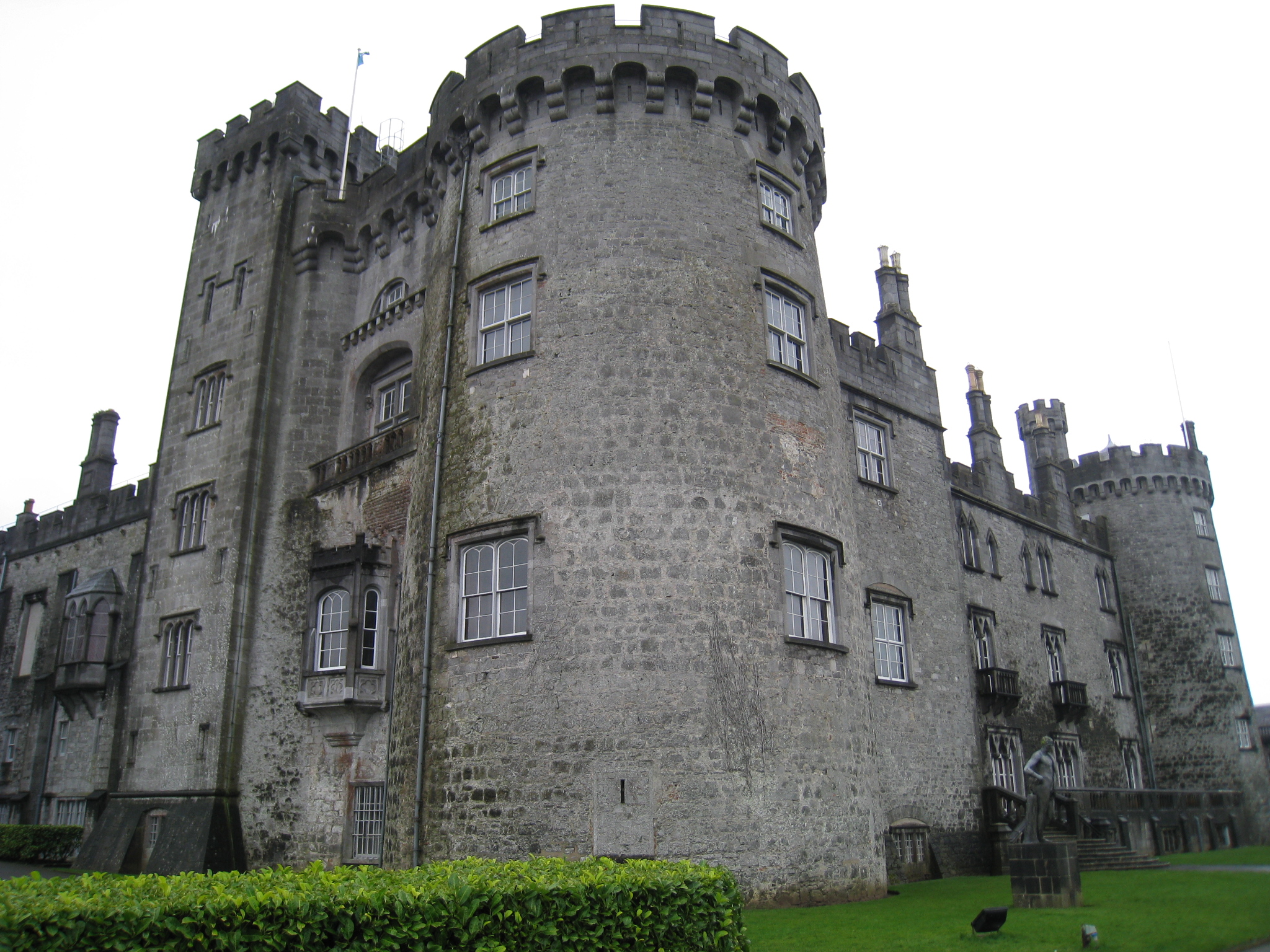
- Kilkenny Castle
Date	22–28 March 1650
Location	Kilkenny, Kingdom of Ireland
Result	Parliamentarian victory

Belligerents
(Commonwealth of England) Parliamentarians	Royalists; Confederates

Commanders and leaders
Oliver Cromwell	Walter Butler

Strength
4,000 Soldiers	300 Soldiers and Civilian Militia

Casualties and losses
Up to 200 killed or wounded	Up to 100 killed, wounded or captured

Ireland and Kilkenny

The siege of Kilkenny took place from 22 to 28 March 1650, during the Cromwellian conquest of Ireland. Previously the capital of Confederate Ireland, the garrison surrendered to Commonwealth forces under Oliver Cromwell.

== Background ==
In August 1649, Commonwealth forces under Oliver Cromwell landed near Dublin to reclaim control from an alliance between Royalists and Irish Confederates. After arriving in Ireland, Cromwell's forces struck hard and fast north of Dublin capturing Drogheda, Belfast, and Carrickfergus. Concurrently, Cromwell attacked and captured the southeastern port cities of Wexford and New Ross before the onset of winter.

On 29 January 1650, taking advantage of a mild winter, Cromwell reinitiated his campaign in southern Ireland with the overall objective of capturing both the Confederate capital of Kilkenny and the fortified stronghold Clonmel. Cromwell began first by dividing his army into multiple columns to attack and capture the outlying Royalist garrisons in the provinces of Munster and Leinster. In the first phase of his campaign, many garrisons were abandoned by the Royalists as Cromwell's columns approached; other Royalists garrisons surrendered without a fight after accepting terms by Cromwell. A number of other garrisons surrendered after short periods of siege and attack. By early March, Cromwell's forces had begun to encircle Kilkenny.

== Kilkenny ==
Kilkenny was a fortified town which was divided into three self-contained walled districts: High Town was next to the Kilkenny Castle and bounded on the east by the River Nore; Irish Town was also bounded on the east by the River Nore and stood adjacent to the northern wall of High Town; St. John's was on the eastern bank of the River Nore and connected to High Town by St. John's Bridge. High Town has a number of streets that still stand today such as; High Street, Walkin Street, James Street and St. Kieran Street.

== Prior to the siege ==
Prior to initiating a siege of Kilkenny, Cromwell had hoped to capture the city by means of a plot. An Irish officer serving as a part of the defence force for Kilkenny, Captain Tickle, had been bribed to betray the city by opening one of the gates to the Parliamentarians. When Cromwell's forces arrived at the appointed time and place to enter the city, however, the Parliamentarians found the intended entry point securely closed and defended. Correspondence proving Tickle's treachery had been discovered, resulting in his being hanged.

Shortly thereafter, as Cromwell prepared to besiege the city, the leader of the Royalist alliance, the Duke of Ormond and the Confederate Commissioners fled Kilkenny to the safety of King John's Castle 90 kilometers to the west in Limerick. The Earl of Castlehaven was given command of the modest Royalist force in southern Leinster province and Sir Walter Butler was placed in command of the Royalist forces in Kilkenny.

In the role as commander of the Kilkenny garrison, Butler was on his own as Lord Castlehaven was in no position to offer any assistance or relief. Adding to Butler's difficulties, the normal complement of able bodied soldiers in the garrison had been reduced from a force of 1,000 infantry and 200 horse to approximately 300 men over the winter of 1649-1650 by the plague. Given so few men, Butler was forced to utilize all his Royalist soldiers to protect and defend High Town and Kilkenny Castle, leaving the defense of Irish Town and St. Johns to a civilian militia.

== The siege of Kilkenny ==
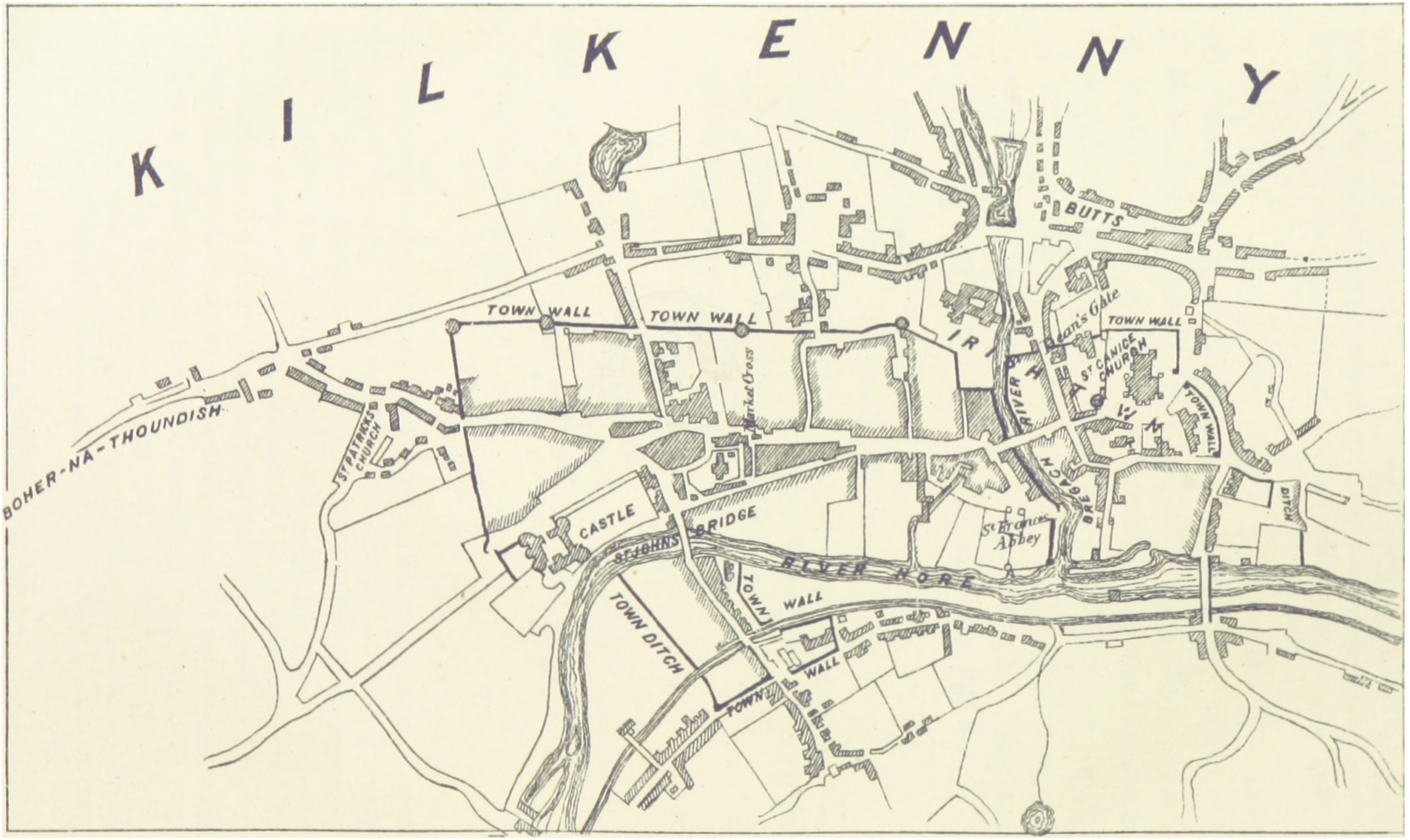
A map of Kilkenny at the time of the siege

On 22 March, Cromwell's forces arrived at Kilkenny. Cromwell immediately offered terms of surrender to the garrison and townspeople. Butler rejected Cromwell's offer the next day causing the Parliamentarians to invest the city and begin the siege and attack in earnest. Cromwell's first act was to send a cavalry regiment in an attempt to storm the gate of Irish Town. The citizen's militia defending Irish Town, however, held strong and Cromwell's forces were repulsed. As the fighting in Irish Town occurred, Cromwell also moved to expand and secure his siege perimeter to include the grounds of St. Patrick's Church to the southwest of the High Town wall. This was successfully accomplished and provided the Parliamentarians with an excellent site for their artillery.

Oliver Cromwell

On 24 March, Cromwell put his artillery in position, but initiated no attacks. On the morning of 25 March, Cromwell started his bombardment of the southern wall of High Town. By Noon, the High Town wall was breached and Cromwell ordered his men to attack. Cromwell's forces stormed the wall and made it inside High Town but were beaten back convincingly by musket fire from defensive works positioned inside. The histories with regard to the fighting at the High Wall on 25 March are unclear. Some sources claim that Cromwell withdrew after one attempt. Other sources claim that two unsuccessful attempts were made by the Parliamentarians and an order for a third attempt was disobeyed by the soldiers. Regardless, Cromwell's forces ultimately withdrew beaten and ended the attack for the day.

Later that day, however, Cromwell sent a second force to attack Dean's Gate on the west side of Irish Town. In contrast to the previous attack on Irish Town, this attack was conducted by means of a combined infantry and cavalry force and proved successful. Quite quickly, in fact, the civilian militia was overcome and the Parliamentarians entered and secured the district. At that point, Cromwell renewed his offer for terms of surrender and allowed Butler time to consider.

While waiting for Butler's response, Cromwell sent a detachment across River Nore to attack St. Johns. The Parliamentarians easily fought their way into this section of the city with the defenders eventually breaking and fleeing across the St. John's Bridge into High Town. The Parliamentarians pursued the defenders and attempted to enter High Town through the gate house but were turned back.

At that point, Butler and the Royalists were in a very difficult position. Cromwell's artillery at St. Patrick's Church remained positioned to batter the southern wall of High Town. Cromwell's forces held St. Johns and were preparing to re-attack the bridge gate house and High Town wall at the river. And finally, Cromwell's forces held the high ground of Irish Town and were setting up an additional battery of artillery at that site to bombard the northeastern walls of High Town.

By the morning of 27 March, Cromwell's artillery fire from Irish Town had opened a second breach in the High Town wall near the Franciscan Abbey. Butler was now faced with protecting and defending three potential points of entry into High Town. Then to make matters even worse at that time, Parliamentarian General Ireton arrived with a column of 1,500 men to reinforce Cromwell's forces if needed.

Seeing no way to successfully defend Kilkenny's High Town and castle against such an onslaught, Butler accepted Cromwell's terms of surrender admitting to himself there was nothing he could do. In doing so, Butler was actually following the orders that he had been given by Lord Castlehaven, those orders being that absent relief, he was not to risk a massacre but to accept a timely surrender with conditions as fair as he might negotiate.

== Aftermath ==
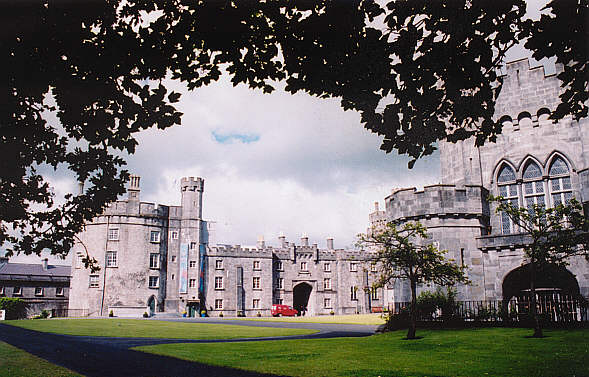
Kilkenny Castle

On 28 March 1650, the city of Kilkenny and the castle were handed over to Cromwell along with all the associated arms, ammunition, and public stores. The citizens of the city were free to leave or alternatively would be protected against violence from the soldiers if they chose to remain. The Royalist and Irish Confederate officers and soldiers were given safe conduct to march away from the city with their colours flying, taking along with them their bags, baggage, horses, and arms.

When the garrison marched out of town they were complimented by Cromwell for their gallantry in battle. Cromwell went on to tell them that his casualties were higher in Kilkenny than the losses he suffered at Drogheda. The number of casualties on either side is not readily available but it is estimated to be fairly low with the greatest number of casualties occurring during the fighting which took place at the breach of the southern wall of High Town.

After Kilkenny, Cromwell would go on to take the Irish Confederate stronghold of Clonmel on 18 May where his army took heavy casualties, before returning to England (see Siege of Clonmel). The Parliamentarian army commanded by Ireton would fight for approximately two more years before ending the last of the combined Irish and Royalist organized resistance at Galway in May of 1652, though Irish forces continued a guerilla campaign for some time after.

== General references ==
- Little, Patrick (2009). Oliver Cromwell: New Perspectives. Basingstoke: Palgrave Macmillan. ISBN 9780230574212. OCLC 244695409.
