= Richard L. Greaves =

American historian

Richard Lee Greaves (September 11, 1938 – June 17, 2004) was an American historian of seventeenth century British history who was also Robert O. Lawton Distinguished Professor of History at Florida State University.

== Early life ==
He was born in Glendale, California and was educated at Bethel College, where he graduated in 1960, and Berkeley Baptist Divinity School, where he obtained an MA in 1962. He was awarded a PhD in 1964 from the University of London, where his supervisor was Geoffrey Nuttall.

== Academic career ==
He held posts at Florida Memorial College, William Woods College, and Eastern Washington State College, before his appointment in 1972 as Michigan State University's associate professor of humanities. In 1985 Greaves was appointed to Florida State University's Courtesy Professorship of Religion and then to their Robert O. Lawton Distinguished Professorship of History in 1989. From 1993 until 2002 he was chairman of the department of history at Florida State.

In 1981 he was elected fellow of the Royal Historical Society and in 1987 to the American Philosophical Society. In 1991 he was appointed president of the American Society of Church History and he also served as president of the International John Bunyan Society (1992–1995).

His 1969 work The Puritan Revolution and Educational Thought was awarded the Walter D. Love Prize of the Conference on British Studies and his Society and Religion in Elizabethan England (1981) was shortlisted for the Robert Livingston Schuyler Prize of the American Historical Association. Greaves was awarded the Albert C. Outler Prize in Ecumenical Church History from the American Society of Church History for his 1997 work, God's Other Children: Protestant Nonconformists and the Emergence of Denominational Churches in Ireland, 1660–1700.

Greaves wrote extensively on John Bunyan and he edited volumes 2, 8, 9 and 11 of Oxford University Press' The Miscellaneous Works of John Bunyan. He also wrote a trilogy on the British radical underground in Restoration Britain: Deliver Us from Evil (1986), Enemies under His Feet (1990) and Secrets of the Kingdom (1992). He also edited the three-volume work Biographical Dictionary of British Radicals in the Seventeenth Century between 1982 and 1984, for which he wrote more than 180 of its entries.

At the time of his death he was writing a biography of Robert Ferguson.

== Works ==
- The Puritan Revolution and Educational Thought: Background for Reform (Rutgers University Press, 1969). ISBN 0813506166
- Theology and Revolution in the Scottish Reformation: Studies in the Thought of John Knox (Christian University Press, 1980). ISBN 0802818471
- Society and Religion in Elizabethan England (University of Minnesota Press, 1981). ISBN 0816610304
- Saints and Rebels: Seven Nonconformists in Stuart England (Mercer University Press, 1985). ISBN 0865541361
- Deliver Us from Evil: The Radical Underground in Britain, 1660-1663 (Oxford University Press, 1986). ISBN 0195039858
- Enemies Under His Feet: Radicals and Nonconformists in Britain, 1664-1677 (Stanford University Press, 1990). ISBN 0804717753
- Secrets of the Kingdom: British Radicals from the Popish Plot to the Revolution of 1688–1689 (Stanford University Press, 1992). ISBN 0804720525
- John Bunyan and English Nonconformity (Hambledon Continuum, 1992). ISBN 1852850728
- God's Other Children: Protestant Nonconformists and the Emergence of Denominational Churches in Ireland, 1660-1700 (Stanford University Press, 1997). ISBN 0804728216
- Dublin's Merchant Quaker: Anthony Sharp and the Community of Friends, 1643-1707 (Stanford University Press, 1998). ISBN 0804734526
- Glimpses of Glory: John Bunyan and English Dissent (Stanford University Press, 2002). ISBN 0804745307
