= Millmount Fort =

Millmount
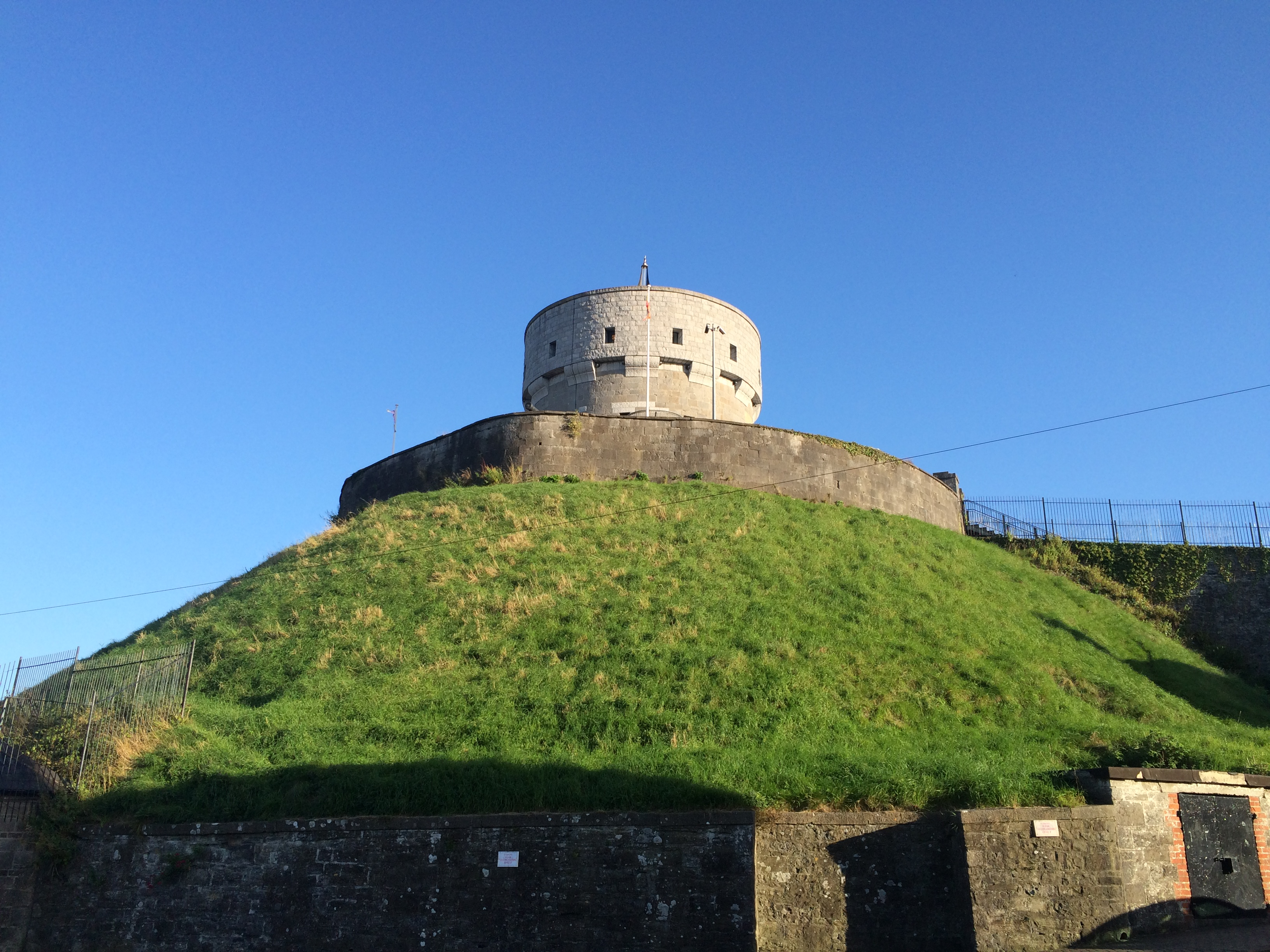
- Interactive map of the Millmount area
- Former names: Richmond Barracks
- Alternative names: Cup and Saucer

General information
- Type: Fortification
- Location: Millmount, Drogheda, Ireland
- Construction started: 12th Century CE
- Owner: Old Drogheda Society

Website
- http://www.millmount.net/

Millmount is a large fortified complex situated on a great mound on the South bank of the River Boyne located in Drogheda, County Louth, Ireland. The fort has played a crucial part in Drogheda's history and has been a dominant feature from Norman settlement, to Cromwell's invasion to the more recent Civil War in 1922, in which the famous Martello tower was shelled and all but destroyed. Today the complex houses the Millmount Museum which houses a wide variety of artifacts of local and national importance. The complex is Drogheda's most dominant feature, clearly visible from all parts of the town. The Martello tower is affectionately known as "The Cup and Saucer" by locals. The whole fort is a national monument and has been designated as Drogheda's Cultural Quarter.

== History ==
It has been fortified in historical times since the early 12th Century CE when the invading Normans built a motte and bailey on what was probably originally a Neolithic passage grave similar to Newgrange. In Irish cosmology, it is often assumed to be the burial place of Amhairgin mac Míled, whose name ("Amhair" = singing; "gin" = give birth) indicates that in ancient Irish mythology he was regarded as the originator of the arts of song, poetry and music. The shamanistic Early Irish poem "The Song of Amhairgin", uttered by him in the story of his entry into Ireland by the River Boyne, was therefore conventionally regarded as the first Irish poem.

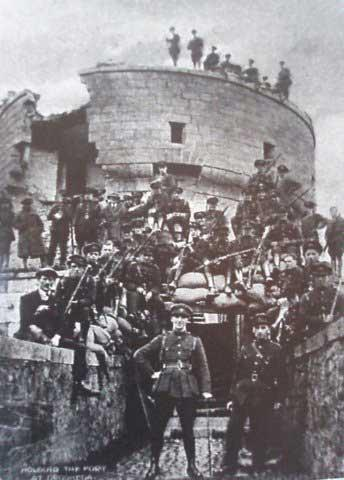
Irish Free State Forces after the shelling of Millmount in 1922

Hugh De Lacy, one of the Normans who came to Ireland after Strongbow, built the original fort circa 1172, having been granted the Kingdom of Meath by Henry II. Later a stone castle was built on the site. This castle formed part of the defences of the town during the siege of Drogheda during the Cromwellian conquest of Ireland in 1649. The fort's English defenders attempted to surrender to Parliamentarian troops under Oliver Cromwell but were massacred when they gave themselves up on 11 September 1649. The complex was later called Richmond Barracks. Some of the present buildings, in the courtyard, were built circa 1714. After the unrest and rebellions of the 1790s and the Act of Union in 1800 the complex was re-fortified and the present tower built.

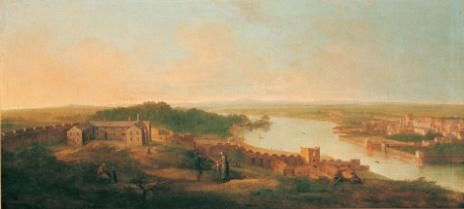
View of Drogheda from Millmount by Gabrielle Ricciardelli c. 1753. Richmond Barracks can be seen in the centre left.

The fort suffered considerable damage during the Irish Civil War. It was occupied by Anti-Treaty forces and on 4 July 1922, it became the target of shelling by the army of the Irish Free State. The Free State Forces under Michael Collins had been given extensive support by the British Army at the express wish of Winston Churchill who insisted that the Republican Forces be crushed. Using the same British Army 18-pounder artillery piece which had shelled the Republican H.Q. in the Four Courts in Dublin some days earlier the Free State Forces bombarded Millmount fort for several hours before the Republican garrison retreated. It has been restored in 2000 and is now open to the public as a military museum.

== Museum ==
The Museum houses a wide variety of artifacts of local and national importance. Chief amongst the attractions is the unique collection of Guild and Trade Banners. This collection is recognised by Ireland's National Museum as being of special significance and includes the only remaining guild banners in Ireland. Popular exhibits at the Millmount Museum include an authentic 18th century Irish folk kitchen, dairy and laundry, and the Irish History Room which details the major events in Ireland's history.

== List of structures ==
Number	Structure	Type	Year
	Town Wall	Fortification	c.13thC
	Martello Tower	Fortification	1808
No.1	Barrack Building	Guard house, Arch and Gate	1831
No.2	Barrack Building	Officers Mess	1850
No.3	Barrack Building	Officers Mess	1850
No.4	Barrack Building	Glazed extension to rear of soldiers' billeting house	1850
No.5	Barrack Building	Soldiers' billeting house	1714
No.6	Barrack Building	Soldiers' billeting house	1714
No.7	Barrack Building	Soldiers' billeting house	1714
No.8	Barrack Building	Soldiers' billeting house	1714
No.9	Barrack Building	Soldiers' billeting house	1714
No.10	Barrack Building	Soldiers' billeting house	1714
No.11	Barrack Building	Soldiers' billeting house	1714
No.12	Barrack Building	Soldiers' billeting house	1714
No.13	Barrack Building	Soldiers' billeting house	1714
No.14	Governor's House	Governor's House	Late 18th Century (Reportedly built in conjunction with the adjacent Martello tower in 1808)
No.15	Barrack Building	Soldiers' billeting house	1810
No.16	Barrack Building	Soldiers' billeting house	1810
16 Mount Saint Oliver	Barrack Building	Soldiers' billeting house	Late 18th Century (Reportedly built in conjunction with the adjacent Martello tower in 1808)

== Gallery ==
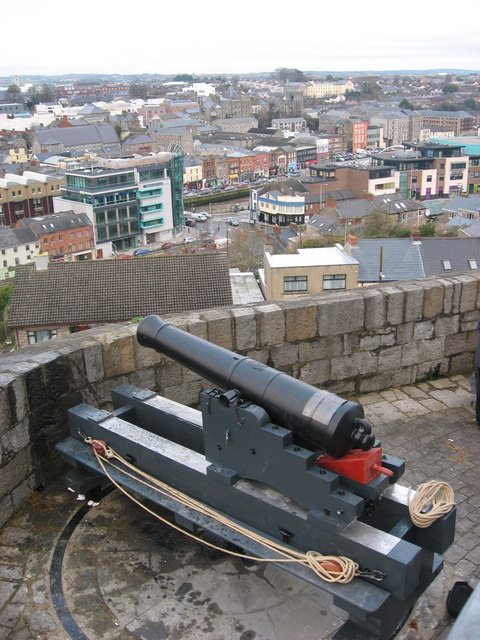
Millmount Fort overlooks the town of Drogheda below

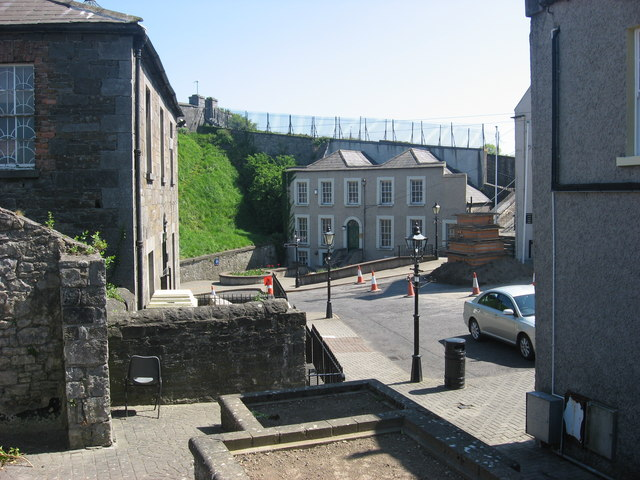
Governor's House

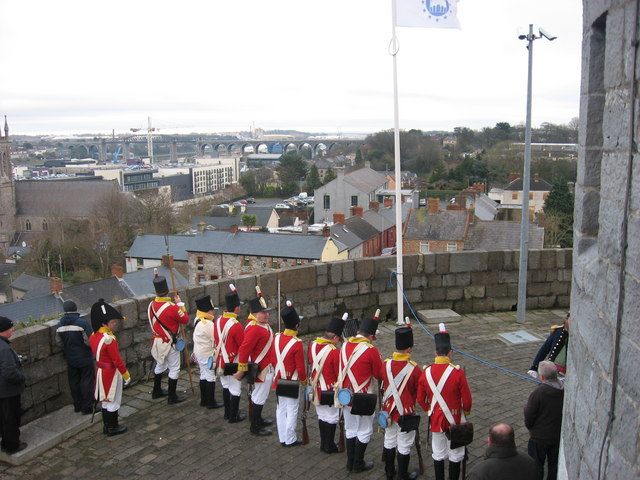
Reenactors ("86th Regiment of Foot") at the fort

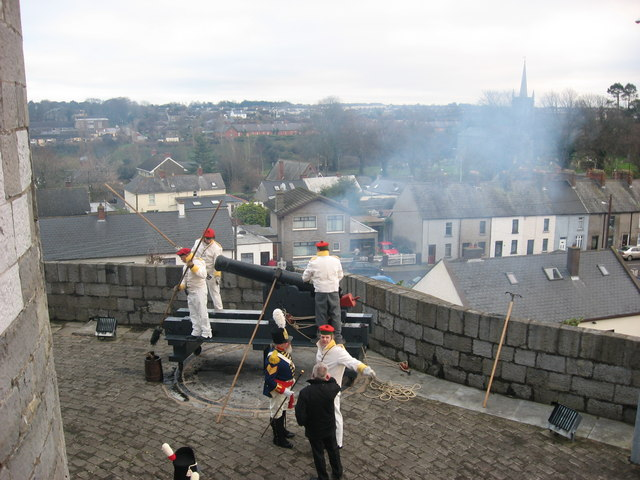
Reenactors ("Royal Artillery") at Millmount

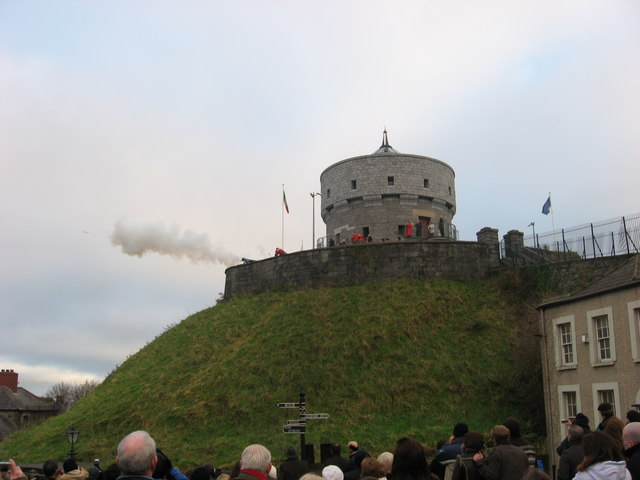
Cannon fire at Millmount

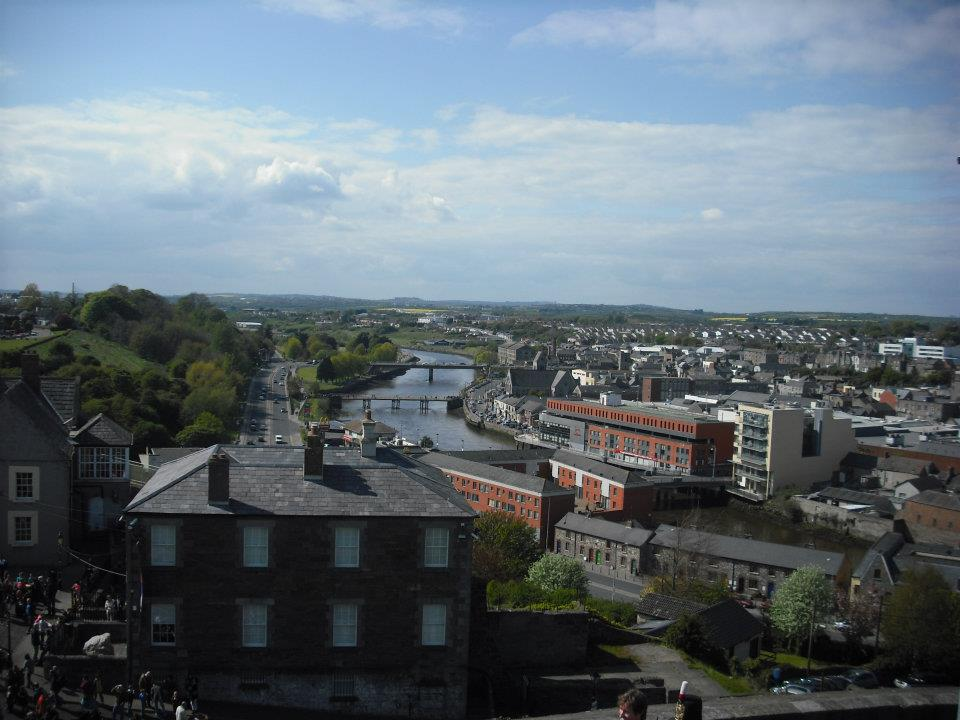
View of Drogheda's south side

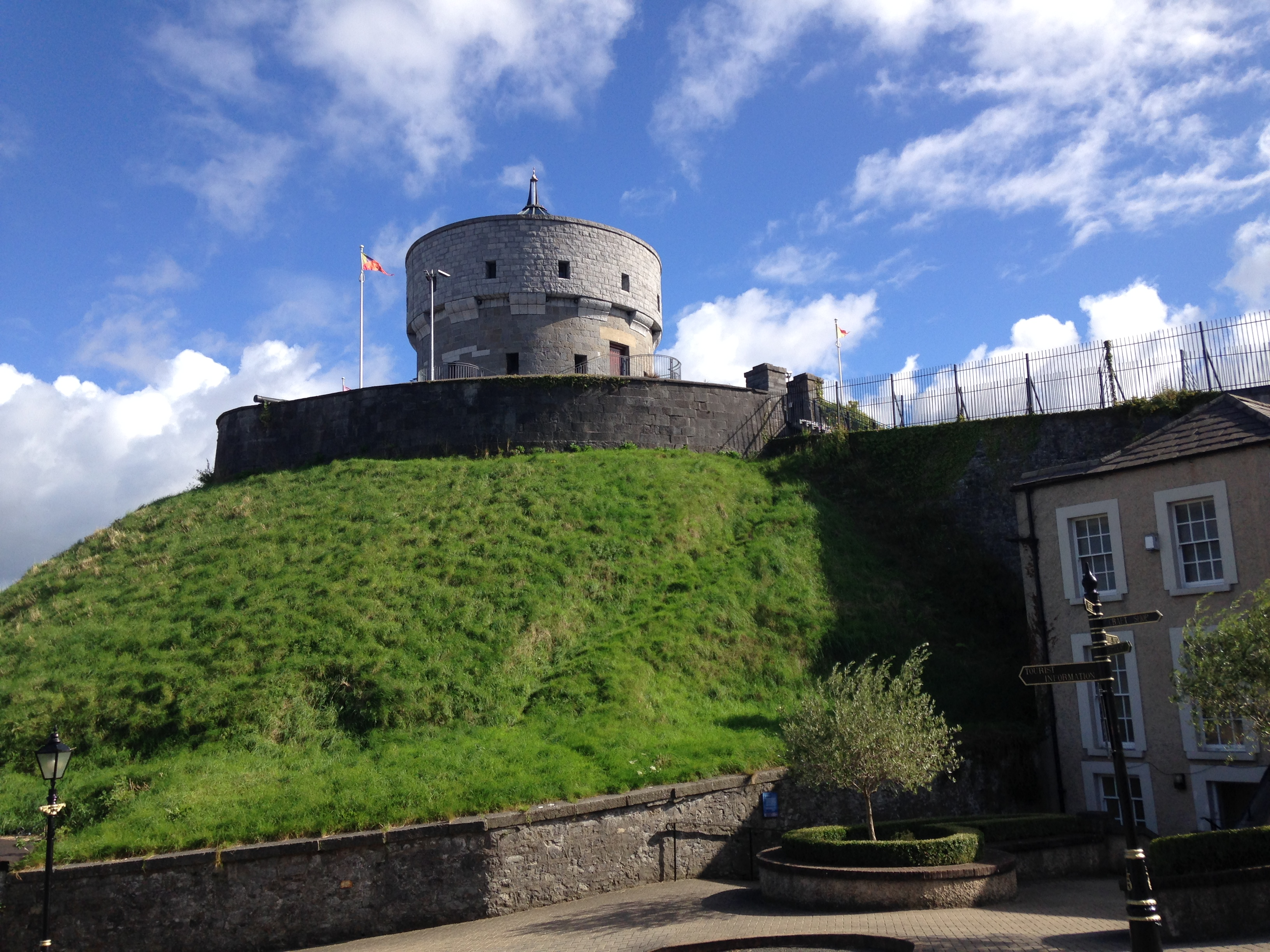
Millmount Fort as viewed from the Visitor Centre
