= The Gray Champion =

Short story by Nathaniel Hawthorne

"The Gray Champion" is a short story published in 1835 by the American writer Nathaniel Hawthorne.

The action takes place in Boston in 1689: As the hated royal governor Edmund Andros parades through the city to intimidate the people, a mysterious old man in old Puritan garb suddenly stands in his way and prophesies the end of his rule. Unsettled, Andros orders his soldiers to retreat, and the next day he is indeed overthrown by a popular uprising. The "gray champion" disappears as abruptly as he came, but it is said that he reappeared during the American Revolution and always returns when danger threatens New England. Hawthorne combined various historical events in "The Gray Champion", on the one hand the Boston Uprising of 1689, and on the other the legend of the "Angel of Hadley", according to which the regicide William Goffe is said to have saved the settlers of the town of Hadley from extreme distress during an Indian attack in 1675.

In literary studies, two opposing interpretations of the story compete. According to the conventional interpretation, the story, told with much patriotic pathos, is entirely in the service of a nationalist interpretation of American history, which portrays the Puritans of the 17th century and the revolutionaries of the 18th century equally as heroic freedom fighters. In contrast, since the 1960s, a growing number of critics have claimed that Hawthorne's intention was ironic; "The Gray Champion" is therefore more a critique of Puritanism and the uncritical ancestor devotion of American historiography.

== Content ==
A brief introduction explains the historical context of the story: it takes place in April 1689, at the time when King James II had suspended the old rights of the New England Colonies and appointed the "rough, unscrupulous soldier" Edmund Andros as their governor. Now rumors spread that an attempted Coup d'état led by the Prince of Orange was underway in England. The prospect that James would be overthrown and Andros' tyrannical rule would soon end caused a "subdued and silent agitation," and people "smiled mysteriously in the streets, and threw bold glances at their oppressors."

The action begins in this tense situation. To show off his power, Andros rides through Boston one evening with his entourage. Like a "machine that relentlessly crushes everything in its path", his soldiers march up King Street, followed by the governor's entourage with his drunken advisors such as Benjamin Bullivant and the "blasted wretch" Edward Randolph. From their steeds they mock the intimidated people, fear and anger spread. The old governor Simon Bradstreet tries in vain to calm the crowd. One desperate voice warns that soon "Satan will strike his master-stroke presently", another that there will be a new St. Bartholomew's night and men and children will be slaughtered, a third sends a prayer to heaven: "O Lord of Hosts! provide a Champion for thy people!" Suddenly, an old man appears on the deserted street, armed with a stick and sword. He is wearing a pointed hat and a dark cloak, the "clothing of the old Puritans" of past decades. Although he is obviously a person of great authority, no one can say who this "gray patriarch" is. To the astonishment of the crowd, the old man strides resolutely towards the ranks of soldiers, stretches out his staff in front of them "like a leader's truncheon" and commands them to stand. When Andros rails at him about how dare he stand in the way of King Jacob's governor, he replies in "stern composure" and in seemingly ancient English:

I have stayed the march of a King himself, ere now […] I am here, Sir Governor, because the cry of an oppressed people hath disturbed me in my secret place; and beseeching this favor earnestly of the Lord, it was vouchsafed me to appear once again on earth, in the good old cause of his saints. And what speak ye of James? There is no longer a Popish tyrant on the throne of England, and by to-morrow noon, his name shall be a byword in this very street, where ye would make it a word of terror. Back, thou wast a Governor, back! With this night thy power is ended—to-morrow, the prison!—back, lest I foretell the scaffold!

These words stir up the crowd even more, violence is in the air, and as the old man firmly blocks the way, the unsettled Andros orders his soldiers to retreat. The next day, the prophecy is fulfilled: William of Orange is proclaimed king in New England, Andros is overthrown and imprisoned. However, the "gray champion" disappears just as suddenly as he had arrived. However, the narrator has heard it said that "whenever the descendants of the Puritans are to show the spirit of their sires, the old man appears again." Thus he was seen eighty years later on King Street (i.e. at the time of the "Boston Massacre"), most recently at the battles of Lexington and Bunker Hill (which began the American War of Independence in 1775).

== Context of the story ==
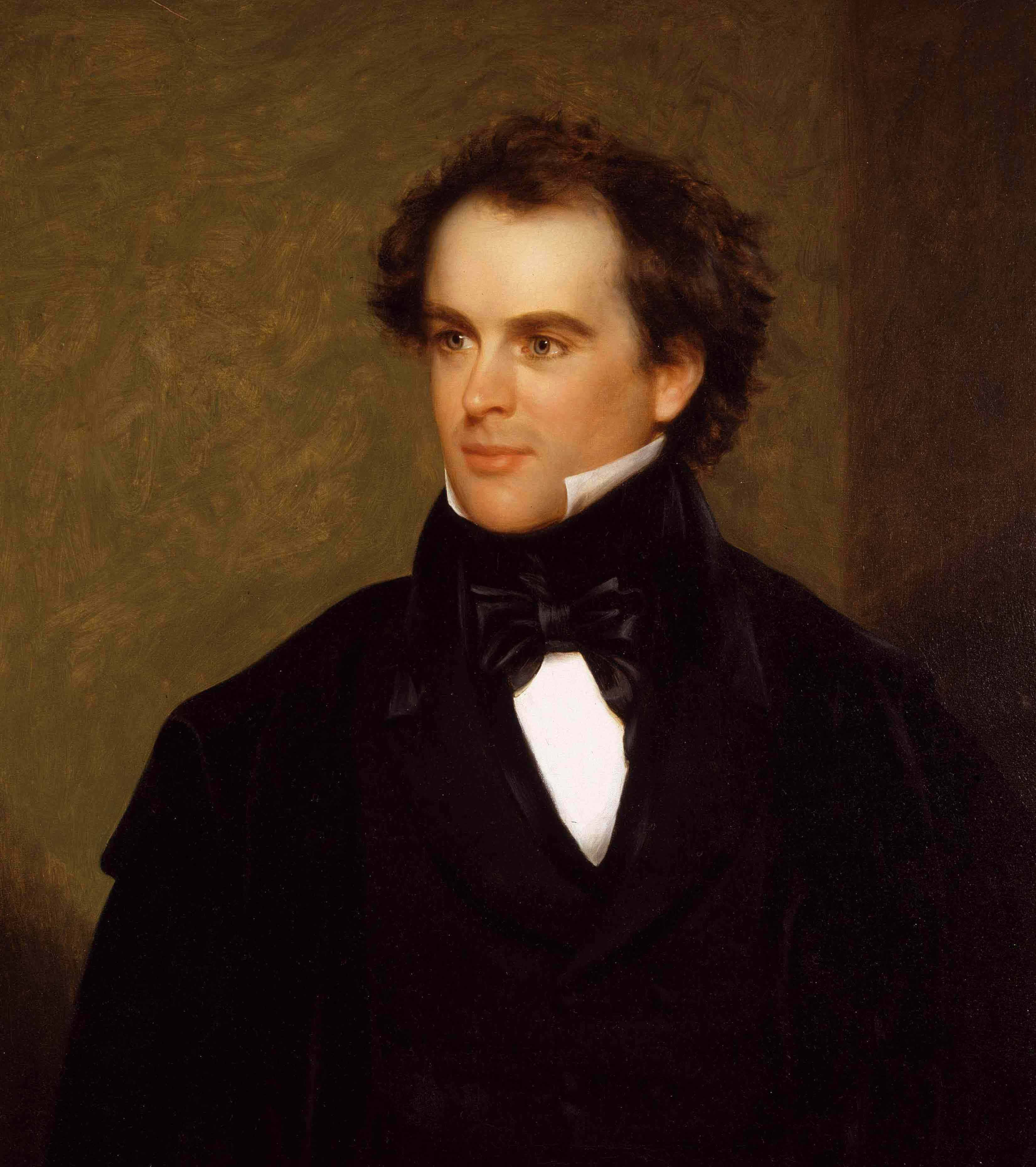
Nathaniel Hawthorne - Painting by Charles Osgood, 1840

=== Origin, history of the edition ===
"The Gray Champion" first appeared in 1835 in the January issue of The New-England Magazine and, like all Hawthorne's works before 1837, initially anonymously, but here with the note that the story was by the same author as "The Gentle Boy" (published in The Token in 1831). In 1837, Hawthorne then published it in the first volume of his collection Twice-Told Tales, which was also his first publication to be signed by name. "The Gray Champion" opens this volume, which has led many critics to assume that Hawthorne attached particular importance to the tale and possibly wanted it to be understood as programmatic for his literary work. In the meantime, the publishing house even envisioned the title The Gray Champion and Other Tales for the collection, although it is unclear whether this title was Hawthorne's idea or that of his publisher.

Originally, however, "The Gray Champion" was almost certainly part of at least one of the other story cycles that Hawthorne had produced in the preceding years, but which never appeared together and are now lost. The majority of scholars who have addressed this bibliographical question assume that The Gray Champion was part of the Provincial Tales collection that Hawthorne compiled around 1828 to 1830. The exceptions include Nina Baym and J. Donald Crowley, one of the editors of the now authoritative Centenary Edition of the Works of Nathaniel Hawthorne; both attribute it to Hawthorne's next project, the framed story cycle The Story-Teller (c. 1832-1834), which has also not survived in its entirety, citing the date of publication. Although the New-England Magazine began serializing the work in 1834, it discontinued it after two issues and from 1835 only published a few individual stories and other fragments without regard to the original context. As "The Gray Champion" also appeared in this publication, it stands to reason that this story was also removed from the story plate. Alfred Weber, who in 1973 presented the most detailed reconstruction attempt of the early story cycles to date, considers this to be probable, but not conclusive; Hawthorne could also have submitted the story additionally. In contrast to other stories, Weber cannot identify any references to the surviving parts of the frame narrative of The Story-Teller, which for him is explained by the fact that it was initially written for the Provincial Tales. Alison Easton also assumes that Hawthorne adopted the story for The Story-Teller after the failure of the Provincial Tales. The story was written for the Provincial Tales.

The findings of source research suggest that it was written before 1830 and therefore belongs to the Provincial Tales: between 1826 and 1830, Hawthorne read a number of historiographical works, as can be seen from the surviving loan registers of the Salem Athenæum, which researchers have identified as the main sources for The Gray Champion. Thematically, "The Gray Champion" corresponds to the basic idea of the Provincial Tales, on which the various attempts at reconstruction can agree. As the title makes clear, its stories were "provincial", i.e. concerned with Hawthorne's native New England, in particular the colonial period (until independence, the colony of Massachusetts was officially called the Province of Massachusetts Bay). Weber works with the hypothesis that, in addition to "The Gray Champion", the collection included six other stories, namely "Alice Doane", "The Gentle Boy", "My Kinsman, Major Molineux", "Roger Malvin's Burial", "The Wives of the Dead" and "The May-Pole of Merry Mount". They all begin with a historical introduction preceding the actual plot, which Weber thus identifies as a characteristic and programmatic feature of the collection.

=== References to other works by Hawthorne ===
The four historical-biographical sketches about famous figures in colonial history that Hawthorne published between 1830 and 1833 are closely related to the Provincial Tales. One of these, "Dr. Bullivant", published in the Salem Gazette on January 11, 1831, is a portrait of Edmund Andros's advisor Benjamin Bullivant, who is also named in "The Gray Champion". The sketches are of particular interest, however, because of their comments on the relationship of literature to historiography, which can be regarded as the poetological foundation of the Provincial Tales. In the sketch "Sir William Phips", Hawthorne argues that scientific historiography may come close to historical truth, but because of its duty to objectivity it can neither make it vivid nor emotionally tangible. This task falls to literature, which, however, must be granted artistic freedom in dealing with historical facts. History and literature (history and romance) are therefore not opposites, but complementary approaches to the past. Hawthorne thus justifies the fact that, as a writer, he poaches on historians' territory and uses their methods and insights, but nevertheless does not feel bound by their constraints. Alison Easton believes that, of all the Provincial Tales, "The Gray Champion" is most clearly written according to this programmatic requirement, but the result does not seem very successful to her: The "invented" parts seemed grafted onto the well-known historical incidents; the narrator failed to develop real characters with a subjective perspective, instead relying too much on political lectures and ultimately always remaining attached to the conventions of contemporary prose.

The majority of Hawthorne's short stories are set in the Puritan era, with Andros's reign being the subject of the four "Legends of the Province House" (1838-1839), according to George Dekker, "The May-Pole of Merry Mount" and "The Gentle Boy" are particularly closely related to "The Gray Champion", as their plots are more closely linked to specific events and historically documented figures in American history than "Young Goodman Brown" or "Roger Malvin's Burial", for example. All three stories are therefore less "universal" or "timeless" than historical literature in the true sense of the word. Their plot is therefore part of a "grand plot": the further course of American history up to the Revolution and beyond. The three stories all deal with the Puritans' strictness and often cruel intransigence towards their political and religious opponents - "The May-Pole of Merry Mount" describes how John Endecot's soldiers put a violent end to the merry activities in the settlement of the adventurer Thomas Morton in 1628, while "The Gentle Boy" deals with the persecution of the Quakers after 1656. They all point more or less explicitly to the Puritan origins of the American "national character" and to the central event in American history, the Revolution. Of particular interest for any examination of Hawthorne's understanding of history is therefore his only story explicitly set in the revolutionary period, "My Kinsman, Major Molineux" (1831). This story also takes place on the streets of Boston, and its depiction of the revolutionaries as a violent, cruel mob reveals telling parallels to "The Gray Champion".

== Historical background, sources ==
=== The uprising against Andros (1689) ===
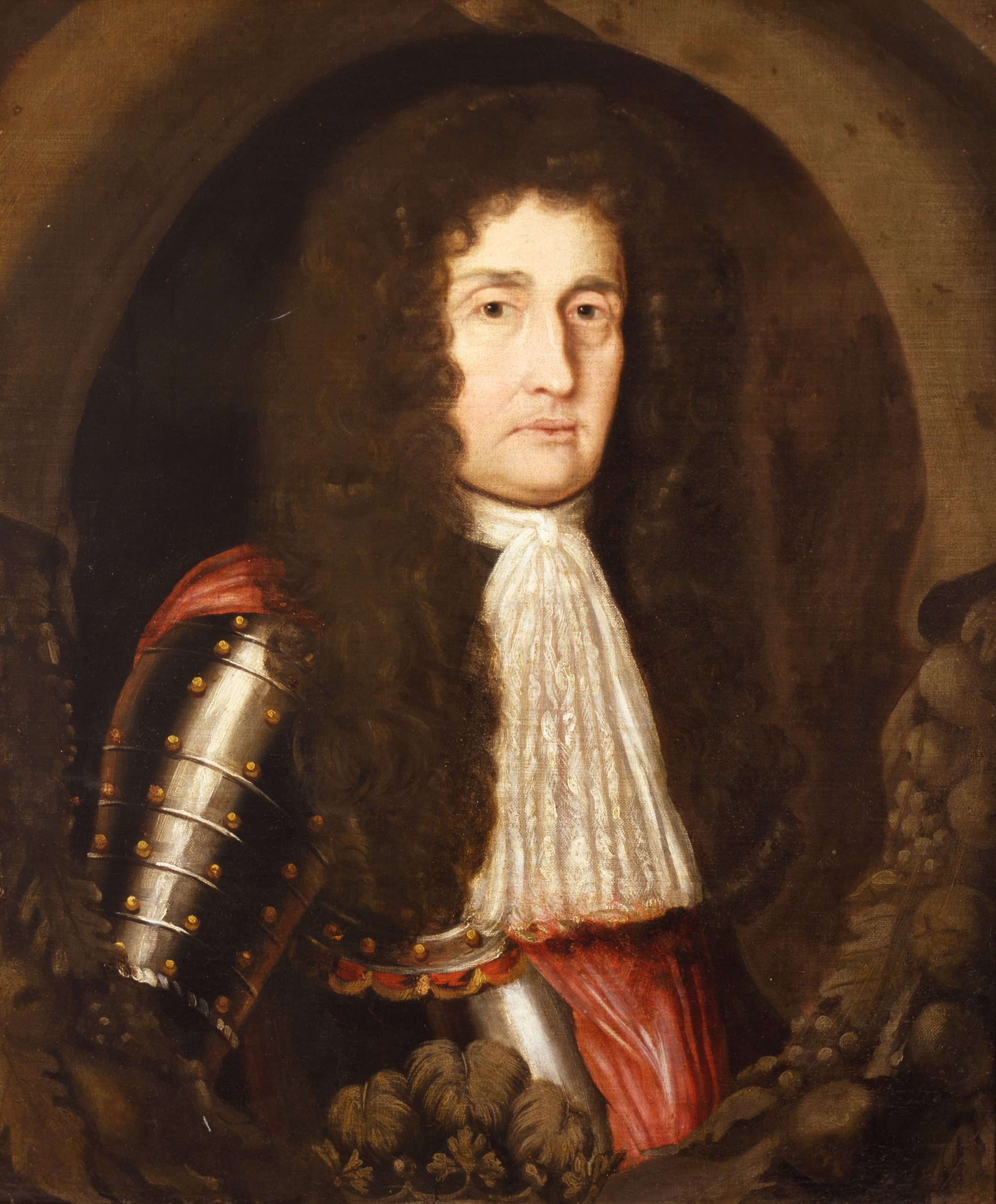
Portrait of Andros by Mary Beale

The historical background to the legend is the political crisis that unfolded on April 18, 1689 in an uprising by the citizens of Boston against the rule of the royal governor Edmund Andros and ended with his deposition and arrest. It began in 1684 when King Charles II revoked the charter of the Massachusetts Bay Colony and converted Massachusetts into a crown colony; in 1685 it was united with the neighboring colonies in a "Dominion of New England". Whereas the New England colonists had previously elected an annual governor from their own ranks, they now had to submit to the rule of a governor appointed by the king. Andros took up this office in 1687. However, the rejection he faced in Massachusetts was not only due to political reasons of the day, but was deeply rooted in the history of the colony. Massachusetts had been founded in 1630 by Puritans who had fled to New England to escape the oppression of the English state church and sought to establish a model society according to their political and religious ideas.

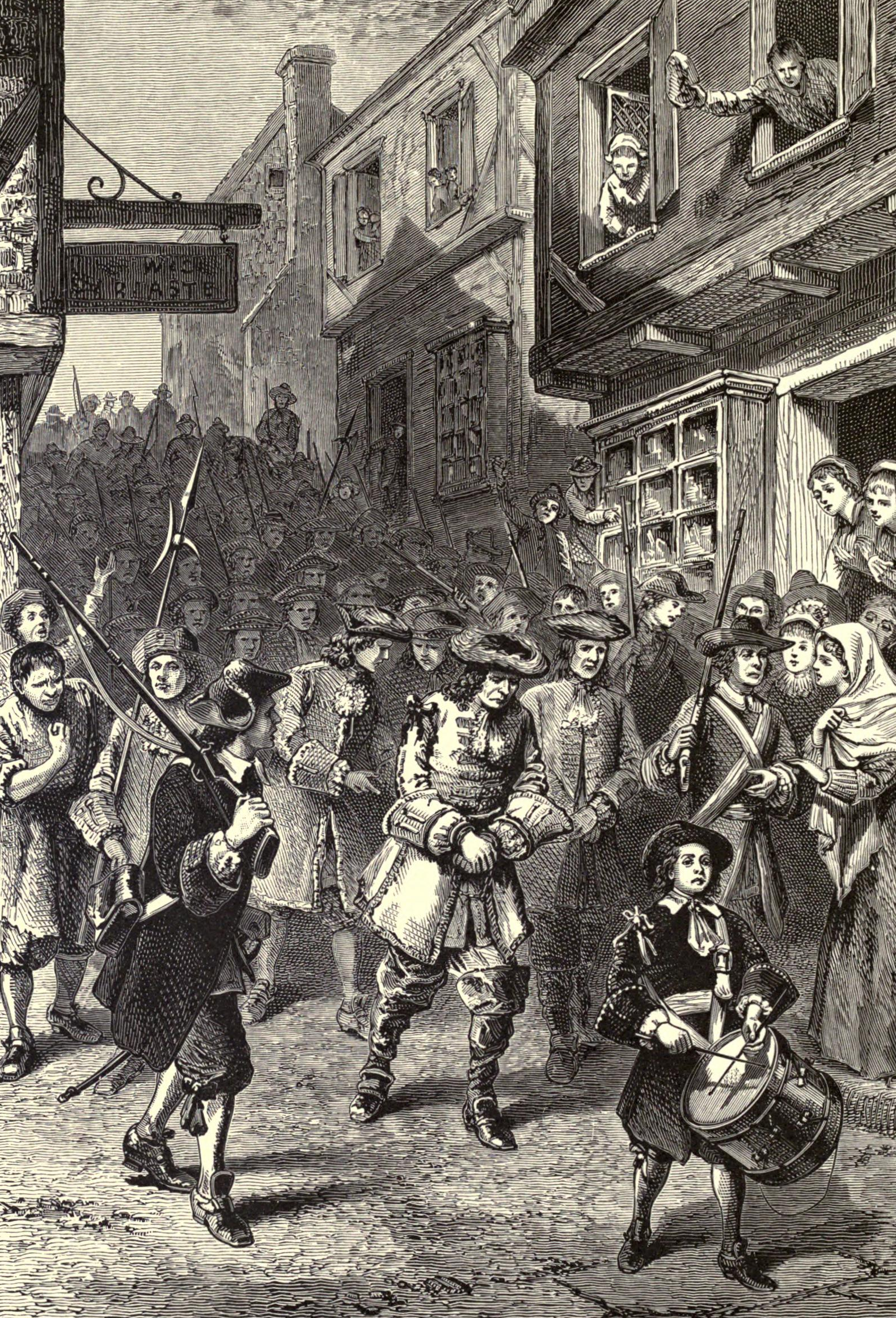
The capture of Andros in a 19th century illustration

The fear of further suppression of their faith was exacerbated in 1685 by the accession to the throne of the Catholic James II; rumors spread that he wanted to make England a Catholic country again. In 1686, the founding of the first Anglican church in New England, the King's Chapel, put an end to the Puritan monopoly on the faith. It is in this context that we can understand why it is not even Andros himself who most agitates the minds of the Bostonians in The Gray Champion, but the official church representative in his regalia. Politically, James II continued the absolutist policies of his predecessor, against which resistance soon arose in England itself. In the course of the Glorious Revolution, he was finally forced to flee towards the end of 1688 and the Protestant William of Orange was crowned the new king. News of James II's overthrow did not reach the colonies until the spring of 1689 due to the violent winter storms, but numerous rumors were already circulating before then, further fueling the explosive atmosphere. In April, a ship finally arrived with a copy of William's royal proclamation. Andros had it confiscated and tried to keep it secret, but the news spread like wildfire and the colonists prepared to take up arms. The plot of The Gray Champion begins in this situation, on the eve of the uprising.

Horst Kruse identifies two main sources for the description of the uprising in "The Gray Champion": Thomas Hutchinson's two-volume History of the Colony and Province of Massachusetts Bay (1764-1767) in a 1795 edition with the accompanying source edition Collection of Original Papers Relative to the History of Massachusetts-Bay (1769), and Daniel Neal's History of New-England (1720). For example, the catalog-like list of Andros' grievances at the beginning of the narrative has a very similar counterpart in Hutchinson. In several places, Hawthorne apparently borrows from the declaration by Cotton Mather, printed in its full length by Neal, which was read out in the Boston marketplace at the height of the revolt. In particular, Mather expresses his confidence in biblical style by saying that God will hear the desperate "lamentations of the poor" and in another place the "cries of the oppressed" ("Him, who hears the Cry of the Oppressed [...]"). In Hawthorne's work, desperate "cries" for divine assistance ("O Lord of Hosts! provide a Champion for thy people") repeatedly arise from the crowd at the side of the road.. Although old Simon Bradstreet admonishes them not to raise a "loud cry", the "gray champion" himself later lets Andros know that the "cry of an oppressed people" has reached him and that he has asked the Lord himself for permission to appear once more on earth. Hawthorne's narrator explicitly refers to Cotton Mather when he adopts his description of Edward Randolph as a "'blasted wretch'" ("Edward Randolph, our arch-enemy, that "blasted wretch", as Cotton Mather calls him"). The passage in question can be found in Mather's Parentator (1724).

The source research also makes it clear in which points Hawthorne leaves the documented course of events behind. It must have been obvious to his readers that the "gray champion" is fictional. But even Andros' provocative ride on Boston's King Street is Hawthorne's invention: in fact, there is no indication in the sources that Andros was ever seen on horseback. This detail is significant because it heightens a symbolic contrast between the rulers on horseback in the middle of the street and the marginalized people below; equestrian statues were long considered the epitome of feudal society in the United States. For Kruse, the static street scene is the most carefully crafted fiction in the story: Hawthorne carefully arranges selected personalities of the time into an allegorical group portrait, knowingly including those such as the "traitor" Joseph Dudley, who were not in Boston at the time, as well as the parvenu Benjamin Bullivant, the soldier Edmund Andros and the pompous clergyman of King's Chapel.

=== The "Angel of Hadley" (1675) ===
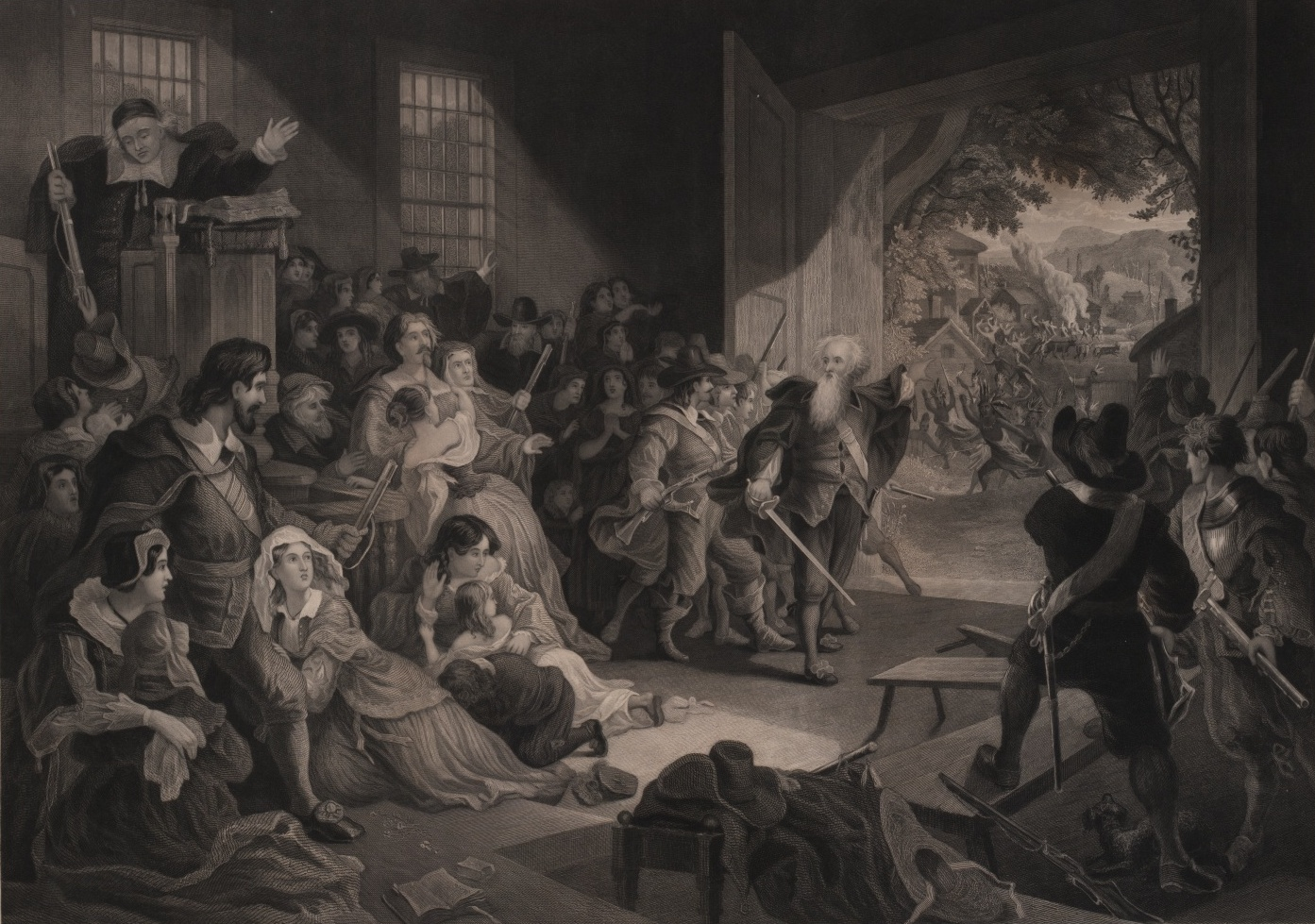
"The perils of our forefathers" - depiction of the Angel of Hadley on an engraving by John C. McRae after a painting by Frederick A. Chapman, after 1850.

The figure of the gray champion is based on a local legend and refers to an earlier era of the Puritan colonial period. The development of the legend of the so-called "Angel of Hadley" has been thoroughly researched, but the extent to which it is based on historical facts remains unclear to this day. It was first recorded in 1764 in the first volume of Thomas Hutchinson's History of the Colony and Province of Massachusetts-Bay; all later versions can be traced back to this one source. Hutchinson reports, citing a local family tradition, that the small town of Hadley was surrounded by Indians in 1675 during King Philip's War. The settlers were celebrating church services and would probably have been taken by surprise if an old man had not suddenly appeared and warned them of the danger. The resolute old man immediately organized the ranks of the defence, repulsed the attack and then disappeared again without a trace. The anecdote can be found in Hutchinson's note on the history of the regicide judges, i.e. the judges who signed the death warrant against King Charles I during the English Civil War in 1649. After the restoration of the House of Stuart to the royal throne in 1660, they in turn were to be prosecuted for this "regicide". Three of them, John Dixwell, Edward Whalley and William Goffe, fled to New England and were hidden in Hadley from 1664 under the strictest secrecy by their Puritan brethren. The mysterious apparition of 1675 was therefore none other than the militarily experienced William Goffe, who left his hiding place for a short time in an hour of danger.

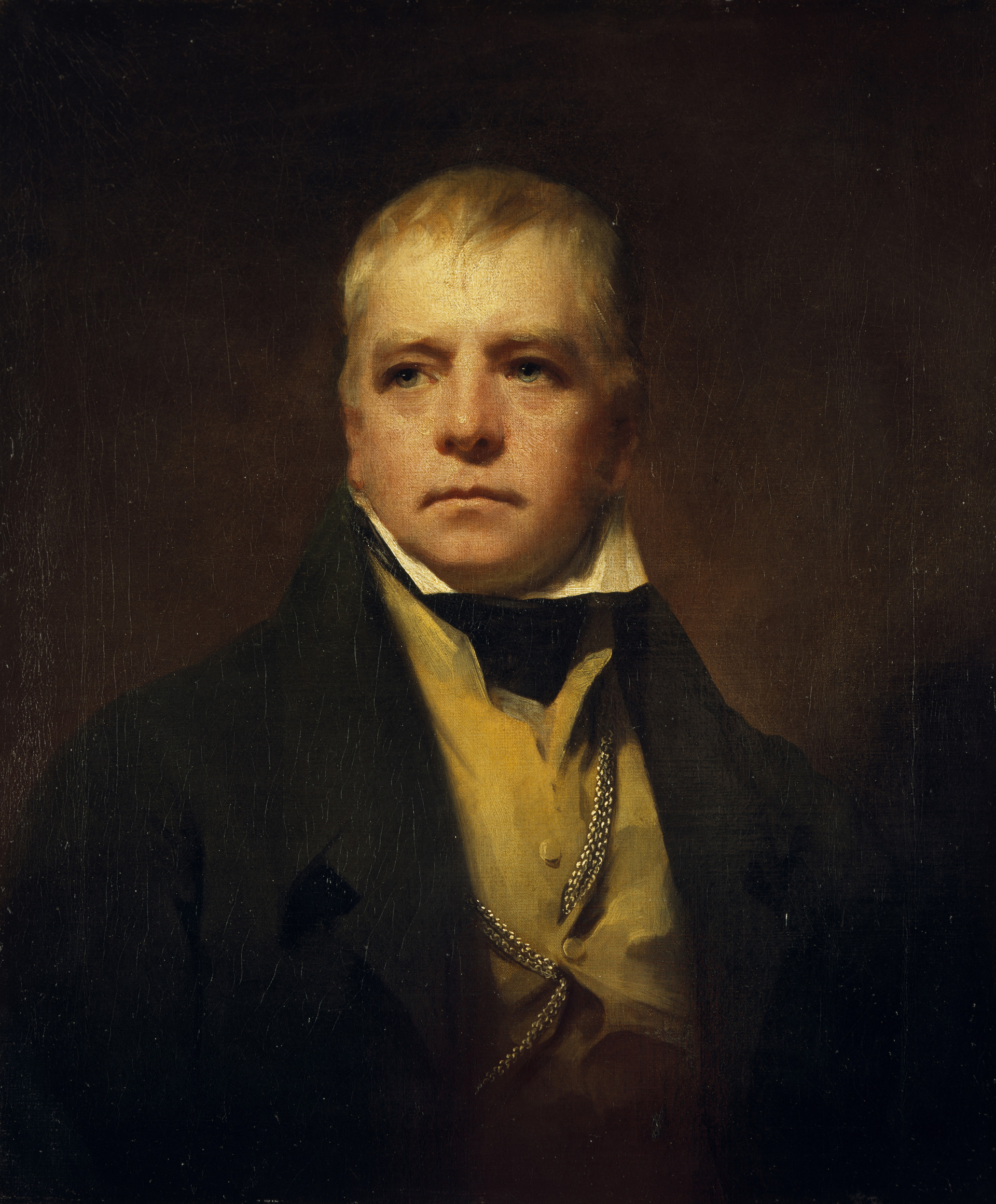
Sir Walter Scott, painting by Henry Raeburn, 1822.

While it seems inconceivable that the presence of three famous men in a small settlement could remain hidden for years, even from their neighbors, this notion evidently fired the imagination of Hutchinson's readers, as did the dramatic rescue from an emergency, the notoriety of regicide and, not least, the uncanny, if not supernatural, qualities of the anecdote. Over the next few decades, the legend was told again and again and eventually became part of folklore. Hawthorne may have been familiar with Hutchinson's account, but the direct model for "The Gray Champion" was Walter Scott's historical novel Peveril of the Peak (1822), which also introduced the material to European literature. Hawthorne is only one of several American writers who reimported the legend in this way; other depictions influenced by Scott include James Fenimore Cooper's novel The Wept of Wish-ton-Wish (1829) and James Nelson Barker's stage play Superstition (1826), which Hawthorne may also have been familiar with. Peveril of the Peak may even have been the inspiration for Hawthorne's choice of title: at one point Scott emphasizes the grey curls of the "Angel of Hadley", at another his grey eyes, and after his disappearance he leads the settlers to assume that he must have been an "inspired champion" (i.e. a "fighter" called or at least inspired by God). Hawthorne's choice of words is sometimes reminiscent of Scott's, but a parallel at the end of the two stories is particularly striking. Scott says the following about the fate of the mysterious warrior: "Perhaps his voice may once more be heard in the field, should England need one of her most noble men." Towards the end of The Gray Champion, a similar prophecy is found:

"But should domestic tyranny oppress us, or the invader’s step pollute our soil, still may the Gray Champion come, for he is the type of New England’s hereditary spirit; and his shadowy march, on the eve of danger, must ever be the pledge, that New England’s sons will vindicate their ancestry."

It is difficult to link Goffe historically to the Boston Uprising; he died around 1679. In 1828, Hawthorne visited Goffe's grave in New Haven and Judge's Cave, a cave in which the three "regicides" are said to have once hidden. He was unimpressed, however, and told his companion Horace Connolly that the cave was the "greatest humbug in America" and that it was not even deep enough to bury a dead cat in. At the time, Hawthorne could still count on his readership knowing Goffe's story and recognizing his allusion:

"And who was the Gray Champion? Perhaps his name might be found in the records of that stern Court of Justice, which passed a sentence, too mighty for the age, but glorious in all after-times, for its humbling lesson to the monarch and its high example to the subject."

After him, Delia Bacon and Harriet Beecher Stowe, for example, took up Goffe's biography, but the succession of works about him came to a halt in the second half of the 19th century and the material was largely forgotten. Mark L. Sargent suspects that this is connected to the assassination of Abraham Lincoln (1865); his murderer John Wilkes Booth justified his act as tyrannicide.

== Interpretations ==
=== Dispute over interpretation ===
While Hawthorne's novels, in particular The Scarlet Letter and The House of the Seven Gables, have occupied a central position in the canon of American literature since the author's lifetime, literary scholars only "discovered" his short stories in the second half of the 20th century; the initial spark was the publication of Q. D. Leavis' essay Hawthorne as Poet (1951). Since then, "The Gray Champion" has been one of his most frequently discussed stories, but hardly because it is considered his most successful. Rather, many critics use this story in particular to demonstrate the problem of irony, which is central to Hawthorne research. Hawthorne's prose is known for its ambiguity; Joel Porte, for example, emphasizes that Hawthorne often means exactly the opposite of what he appears to say.

The difficulty of proving an ironic intention, i.e. trying to deduce the author's intention or attitude from the statements in his story, has become so central to the history of Hawthorne's reception that the concept "Hawthorne Question" has been coined to describe it.

Like few stories, "The Gray Champion" has inspired such attempts, because the jingoism displayed by the narrator can hardly be reconciled with the common image of Hawthorne as a skeptic and astute observer of human and social abysses. The Gray Champion comes across as a Rorschach picture. Critics such as Ursula Brumm, Neal Frank Doubleday and Nina Baym stand for the conventional reading. They take the narrator at his word and see the story as an expression of a convinced patriotism typical of the time; as late as 1979, Lea Bertani Vozar Newman described this interpretation as predominant in her research overview. Since the 1960s, critics have increasingly read the text as a satirical pastiche: According to them, Hawthorne does not speak after his contemporaries, but rather mimics them. Of particular note here are the works of Frederick C. Crews (1966), Frederick Newberry (1973/1987), Michael J. Colacurcio (1984) and G. R. Thompson (1993).

=== Nationalist interpretations ===
==== The context of American national romanticism ====
As a young country that emerged from the former English colonies after a revolution, the United States had a particular need to prove itself as a nation, especially to the "old" nations of Europe, but also to reassure itself. Historiography and literature played a particularly important role in this. Writers were expected to refute the European prejudice of the "uncultured" Americans. Soon after the Revolution, American historiography clearly endeavoured to demonstrate the distinctiveness and autonomy of the Americans even in the pre-Revolutionary period and thus to historically legitimize their independence and nationhood. The choice of language and themes in "The Gray Champion" should be understood in this cultural and ideological context.

In many respects, the story corresponds to the "program" of American romantic nationalism, for example in the choice of setting. Even in Washington Irving's Sketch Book (1819-1820), which was a model for Hawthorne in many respects, most of the stories are set in European locations. However, the two exceptions, Rip Van Winkle and The Legend of Sleepy Hollow, which are set in rural New York, were the most popular - although both stories are based on German legends. The Gray Champion, on the other hand, deals with the "Angel of Hadley", a genuinely American story that also bears the hallmarks of a saga or legend: On the one hand, it connects a verified historical event with the fairytale-like idea of a guardian angel; on the other hand, according to Hutchinson, it is rooted in oral tradition, so in a certain sense it is "folkloric," and thus not only a national, but also a typically Romantic subject. Hawthorne was not the first to recognize this; as early as 1815, William Tudor, in an article in the North American Review, listed memorable events in American history that lent themselves particularly well to literary adaptation and also recommended the "Angel of Hadley."

Henry James also emphasized the importance of the setting in his biography of Hawthorne (1879). James, who himself left his native New England at an early age and describes it here with a slightly mocking distance, characterizes Hawthorne as a proud local patriot. He had done Massachusetts a great service by bringing the state's "primitive annals" to life in order to at least make them seem picturesque. The city of Boston should be particularly grateful to him for "The Gray Champion", which he emphasizes as a work of great beauty and compares to a showpiece because of its economy. He also praised the vivid descriptions of the characters.

==== Typological and nationalist historiography ====
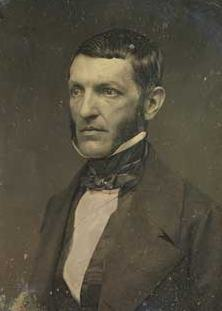
George Bancroft, 1846

In addition to the location, the specific historical background has also been chosen with care. The uprising against Andros in 1689 was often portrayed in 19th century American historiography as a kind of stage rehearsal for the American Revolution, even though the Puritans, who were better known for their austerity and fear of God, were only partially suited to the rebel role intended for them. George Bancroft, the leading American historian of his time, describes the uprising as an early manifestation of a specifically American desire for freedom that was already present at the time and an important stage in the formation of the nation. Although his twelve-volume History of the United States was not published until 1834 and cannot be considered a direct model, Hawthorne was certainly familiar with his earlier writings. Bancroft's account has often been compared to "The Gray Champion", and George Dekker even describes Hawthorne's prose as its "fictional clone." Hawthorne already points out in the first sentence that history seems to be repeating itself here, and the second makes use of the anti-monarchist invective found in Bancroft, but also in English Whig historians such as Thomas Babington Macaulay:

"There was once a time when New England groaned under the actual pressure of heavier wrongs than those threatened ones which brought on the Revolution. James II, the bigoted successor of Charles the Voluptuous, had annulled the charters of all the colonies, and sent a harsh and unprincipled soldier to take away our liberties and endanger our religion. The administration of Sir Edmund Andros lacked scarcely a single characteristic of tyranny […]

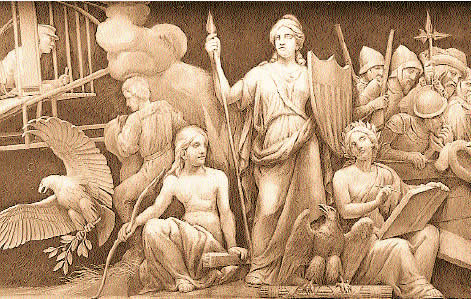
"America and History" - The first panel in the "Frieze of American History" in the rotunda of the United States Capitol (1878) shows Columbia, the personification of the United States, wearing a Phrygian liberty cap. Puritan soldiers can be seen in the background, with Clio, the muse of historiography, in the foreground.

Unless one assumes a parodic intention on Hawthorne's part, as many critics do, one must conclude that Hawthorne shares Bancroft's enthusiastic patriotism, if only because he appeals to his audience by seeing "our" liberties in danger. Thus Nina Baym says that "The Gray Champion" is "unambiguously patriotic, and his attitude toward the Puritans unreservedly affirmative," and Edward Wagenknecht that Hawthorne presents the "struggle of his ancestors against their adversaries" as a contrast like "black and white" (the fact that the fighter is gray escapes him, as G. R. Thompson notes). For Henry G. Fairbanks, it is no less a triumph of patriotism than of Protestantism, so vividly portrayed that it could still stir the emotions today. Several of the other critics who do not see the text as satire, however, are embarrassed by Hawthorne's sabre-rattling, despite their understanding of other times, customs and circumstances, such as Neal Frank Doubleday. Although he identifies some ironic overtones in the portrayal of the Puritans, the story as a whole is firmly anchored in the nationalist historiography and literature of its time.

Bancroft and Hawthorne's identification of the Boston riot of 1689 with the American Revolution is rooted in the typological tradition that characterized Puritan historiography. According to typological biblical exegesis, similarities between persons and events in the Old Testament and those in the New Testament can be explained as divine promises. Typology became of paramount importance to the Puritans of New England, who habitually applied this tool for understanding Scripture to secular matters. In the hope that the promises of the New Testament would be fulfilled in their lifetime, they also sought biblical correspondences for current political developments and natural phenomena and soon believed that they had indeed identified signs of providence everywhere. Long after the end of Puritanism and despite progressive secularization, this Puritan trait continued to have an effect. Bancroft and Hawthorne's comparison therefore not only legitimizes the revolution by asserting historical continuity, but also at least implicitly lends it a salvation-historical significance. According to Peter Shaw, Hawthorne explicitly uses the vocabulary of Puritan typology in his description of the "gray champion" as the "pattern and model of the inherited spirit of New England", while the proleptic assertion of a "primitive democratic spirit" already prevalent among the Puritans corresponds entirely to the 19th century view of history.

==== Allegory and myth ====
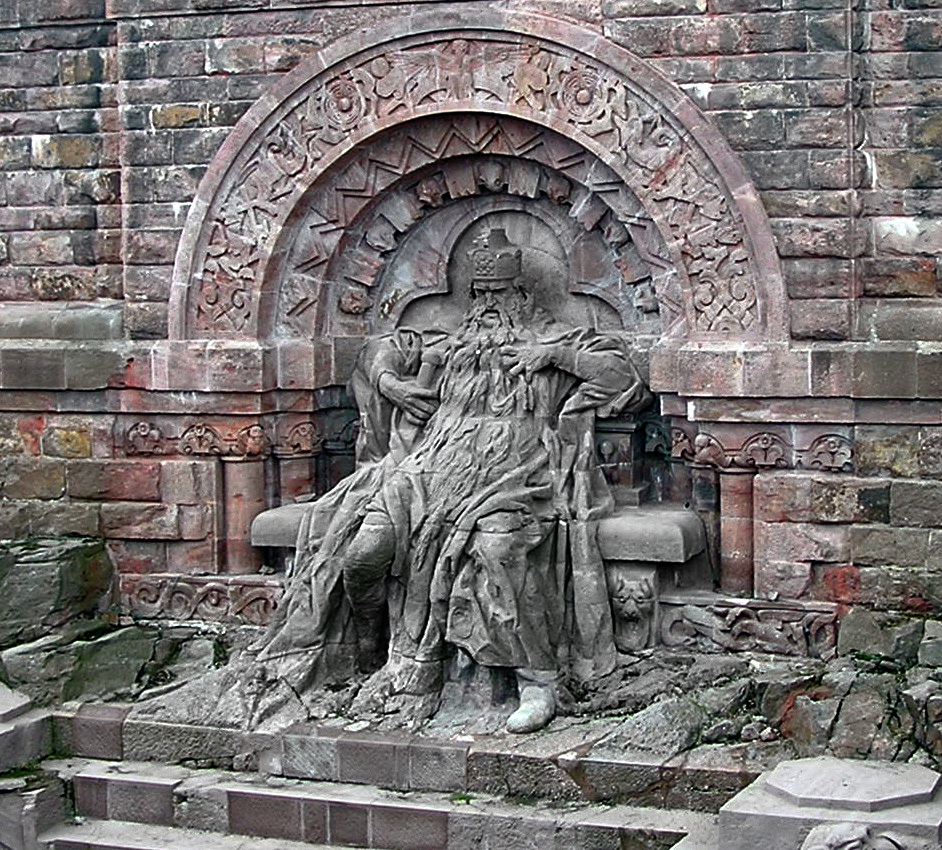
Depiction of the sleeping Frederick Barbarossa on the Kyffhäuser monument (1896)

According to Ursula Brumm, the effectiveness of the story for the purpose of patriotic edification is explained not so much by the rhetoric of the word level, but by its deeper allegorical and mythical qualities. The composition of the street scene is allegorical in the true literary sense, as several critics emphasize:

"The whole scene was a picture of the condition of New England, and its moral, the deformity of any government that does not grow out of the nature of things and the character of the people"

In a more general sense, the typological comparison of the "two revolutions" is also based on an allegorical method. According to Brumm, Walter Scott was the first to recognize the mythical potential of the story of the "Angel of Hadley". Scott found in it an ancient and widespread material, the myth of the enraptured "king in the mountain", who would one day reappear to his people and lead them back to power and greatness. As Scott knew, one version of this myth was one of the most powerful narratives of the German nationalist movement, namely the legend of the sleeping Frederick Barbarossa, who sleeps in the Kyffhäuser but will one day return and restore "the glory of the empire" (Friedrich Rückert). Washington Irving, who was a frequent guest at Scott's Scottish country estate during his time in Europe, became acquainted with the Kyffhäuser saga through Scott and also alluded to it in Rip Van Winkle, but rather casually as a patriotic decoration of this more entertaining than political story. Scott emphasized the mythical, timeless character of the figure of the "Angel of Hadley" in his description of the Indian attack in Peveril of the Peak, but did not make him a hero. As a conservative Tory and newly knighted, Scott had little sympathy for a regicide and therefore concludes the episode with a moralistic discussion of merit and guilt, good and evil.

The fact that the American king in the mountain is also a regicide on record would have seemed only half as bad to Hawthorne, especially since the United States was born, if not from a murder, then from a rebellion against the British monarchy. Hawthorne emphasizes the mythical traits of the "angel" even more than Scott by removing almost all of his individual traits - his name is not revealed here, there is not even a reference to his heroic deeds in Hadley. However, he made the historically specific reference to the act of regicide the dramatic turning point of the story, thus giving the legend a new meaning. As an allegorical figure, according to Brumm, the "Gray Champion" thus reconciles the contradictions of the New English character: like the Puritans and later the revolutionaries, he brings down one hierarchy and establishes a new one, questioning authority but at the same time claiming it for himself. For Brumm, "The Gray Champion" is a testimony to the "myth-making activity of a young nation", but at the same time pursues a concrete political goal: at a time when the political center of power in America had shifted to the South, "it reminds the nation that the Puritans of New England were the true pioneers of rebellion and the true representatives of the free and independent spirit."

=== Ironic interpretations ===
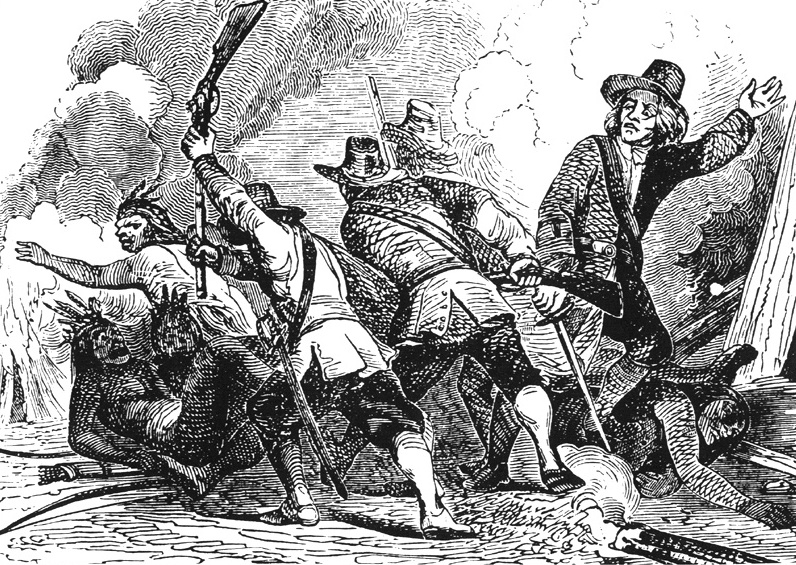
Puritan soldiers in battle with Indians in a 19th century depiction

Since the 1960s, a growing number of critics have suspected an ironic intention on Hawthorne's part behind the narrator's ostensible patriotic enthusiasm, which is directed both against the Puritans themselves and against their appropriation by nationalist historiography. Frederick C. Crews, in his psychoanalytically influenced study The Sins of the Fathers (1966), is less interested in concrete historical and political statements than in Hawthorne's underlying image of man and society. For him, "The Gray Champion" represents the "hidden unity" or rather similarity of the antagonists, the Puritans are portrayed as no less repressive than their royal oppressors. Ultimately, history shows that authority can only be surpassed by even stronger authority; the "Gray Champion" is, alongside Governor Andros, the King of England and the Pope of Rome, on the other hand, but also Simon Bradstreet and the other Puritan "patriarchs", only the strongest of various father figures competing for the "filial love" of Boston's citizens. Crews and, a few years later, Newberry (1977) have unanimously traced how irony is embedded in the structure of the story: according to them, although the story begins and ends with a patriotic praise of the Puritans as proto-democratic revolutionaries, typical of the time, their description in the intervening passages stands in marked contrast to this.

In fact, in the face of the threat, Hawthorne's Puritans show their "strong, gloomy features" even more than usual and, like the first Puritan settlers, again trust that "the blessing of heaven is upon their righteous cause"; he also makes it clear that their self-righteous religious fanaticism repeatedly led to bloodshed:

"Old soldiers of the Parliament were here, too, smiling grimly at the thought that their aged arms might strike another blow against the house of Stuart. Here, also, were the veterans of King Philip’s war, who had burned villages and slaughtered young and old, with pious fierceness, while the godly souls throughout the land were helping them with prayer."

The Puritans were most incensed by the sight of the Anglican priest in his vestments, which appeared to them to be a paragon of papist presumption and idolatry. However, they themselves unwittingly succumbed to this sacrilege because, as the narrator remarks, they treated their own clergy "with the greatest reverence, as if their very garments were sacred". Significantly, they disregard their most dignified patriarch, "good old Governor Bradstreet", who exhorts them to keep calm and "submit to constitutional authority." For Crews, the irony of these passages is "overwhelming", and both Newberry and Colacurcio see them as inconsistent with the democratic-patriotic rhetoric of the introduction. In their interpretation, however, the irony does not only arise in retrospect from a modern understanding of history; rather, it is Hawthorne's fundamental authorial intention. Several critics see subtle hints in Hawthorne's choice of title that point to the ambiguity of the story. It is no coincidence that the old fighter is neither white nor black, but gray, making him difficult to identify. Moreover, "The Gray Champion" is the first of the Twice-Told Tales, which perhaps only reveal their meaning at second glance. G. R. Thompson explains the dual nature of these stories with a model of reception aesthetics. For the unsuspecting "average" reader, the story functions entirely in line with his expectations as patriotic edification literature. The ideal implicit reader, on the other hand, is able to recognize the author's subtle ironic hints and the contradictions of the narrative. He sees the narrator figure, who so succinctly jubilates over the genocide of the Indians, for example, as a parody in the tradition of Swift's A Modest Proposal (1729).

As Newberry points out, the ambiguity is often inherent in Hawthorne's precise choice of words, as in the allegorical interpretation of the street scene, when, according to Newberry, Hawthorne's narrator deliberately speaks not of the evil of this very special government, but of "any government" that disregards "nature"; the accusation thus applies equally to Andros and the Puritans. Colacurcio draws attention to a further subtle ambiguity: towards the end of the story, the narrator exclaims about the gray champion: Long, long may it be, ere he comes again! The "may" can be understood here as a cautionary suggestion - it could be a long time before the gray champion reappears - or as an optative: "Long, long" may it be, according to the narrator's wish, before the repressive "spirit of the forefathers" makes itself felt again. Newberry and Colacurcio also point out that the "gray champion" is repeatedly associated with the devil: When the voice in the crowd fears that now "Satan will strike his master-stroke presently," it is obviously warning of an imminent act of violence by Andros and his soldiers, but immediately after this exclamation the gray champion appears in the street, and Bullivant sneers down from his steed at the supposed old dodderer: "Doubtless, he thinks to put us down with a proclamation in Old Noll's name!" In support of his thesis of the gray champion as an emissary of Satan, Newberry also refers to Scott's example, who at least hints that the angel of Hadley, as a regicide, is in league with evil.

Hawthorne's narrator also seems to quietly criticize the historical picture on which the story is apparently based; when some hysterical voices fear that Andros is planning a new St. Bartholomew's Day, he remarks dryly:

Neither was this rumor wholly discredited, although the wiser class believed the Governor’s object somewhat less atrocious.

According to Colacurcio, Hawthorne is also parodying the almost paranoid scoffing and self-mortification that Perry Miller, the founder of modern Puritan studies, identified a good century later as the defining motif of Puritan lamentations ("jeremiads") of the late 17th century. For Newberry and Colacurcio, then, The Gray Champion is ultimately by no means a contribution to the nationalist mythologization of the past, but rather deconstructs it through an ironic imitation of an ideological historical misrepresentation that attempts to whitewash irreconcilable contradictions. Thompson further underlines the significance of this distinction: she makes a teleological distinction between the belief in progress (especially the American "Manifest Destiny") and an ultimately senseless and lawless course of world history.

However, this interpretation has not gone unchallenged. Against Colacurcio's remark that Hawthorne's narrator had read too much Cotton Mather and too much George Bancroft, George Dekker, for example, argues that this could just as well be applied to Hawthorne himself, and that the desire for a "subversive" Hawthorne makes Colacurcio's reading all too biased; ultimately, however, Dekker also agrees with the view that the story leaves room for both interpretations. Alison Easton acknowledges the irony of the story, but says it is so subtle that it is barely perceptible; thus, for most readers, the story does no more than reproduce the nationalist ideology of the 19th century.

== Bibliography ==
=== Editions ===
The first edition of the Twice-Told Tales can be found digitized on the pages of the Internet Archive:

- Hawthorne, Nathaniel (1837). Twice-Told Tales. American Stationers' Co., Boston.

The modern standard edition of Hawthorne's works is The Centenary Edition of the Works of Nathaniel Hawthorne (ed. by William Charvat, Roy Harvey Pearce et al., Ohio State University Press, Columbus OH 1962-1997; 23 volumes). The Gray Champion can be found here in volume IX (Twice-Told Tales, 1974), edited by Fredson Bowers and J. Donald Crowley, pp. 9–18. Numerous anthologies of Hawthorne's short stories contain the tale; a widely used reader's edition based on the Centenary Edition is:

- Hawthorne, Nathaniel (1982). Tales and Sketches. Edited by Roy Harvey Pearce. Library of America. New York. ISBN 1-883011-33-7.

=== Secondary literature ===
- Michael Davitt Bell: Hawthorne and the Historical Romance of New England. Princeton University Press, Princeton NJ 1971, ISBN 0-691-06136-X.
- Ursula Brumm: A Regicide Judge as “Champion” of American Independence. In: Jahrbuch für Amerikastudien 21, 1976. S. 177–186. Deutsche Fassung: Ein „Königsmörder“ als „Champion“ der amerikanischen Unabhängigkeit. In: Ursula Brumm: Geschichte und Wildnis in der amerikanischen Literatur. Erich Schmidt Verlag, Berlin 1980, ISBN 3-503-01636-8. pp. 119–134. (=Grundlagen der Anglistik und Amerikanistik 11)
- Michael J. Colacurcio: The Province of Piety: Moral History in Hawthorne’s Early Tales. Harvard University Press, Cambridge MA 1984. Reprint: Duke University Press, Durham NC 1996, ISBN 0-8223-1572-6.
- Frederick C. Crews: The Sins of the Fathers. Hawthorne’s Psychological Themes. Oxford University Press, New York 1966. Reprint: University of California Press, Berkeley/Los Angeles 1989, ISBN 0-520-06817-3.
- George Dekker: The American Historical Romance. Cambridge University Press, Cambridge 1990. (= Cambridge Studies in American Literature and Culture 23) ISBN 0-521-33282-6.
- Neal Frank Doubleday: Hawthorne’s Early Tales: A Critical Study. Duke University Press, Durham NC 1972.
- Horst Kruse: Hawthorne and the Matrix of History: The Andros Matter and ‘The Gray Champion’. In: Winfried Fluck (ed..): Forms and Functions of History in American Literature: Essays in Honor of Ursula Brumm. Erich Schmidt Verlag, Berlin 1981, ISBN 3-503-01660-0.
- John Probasco McWilliams: Hawthorne, Melville and the American Character: A Looking Glass Business. Cambridge University Press, 1984. (= Cambridge Studies in American Literature and Culture 3) ISBN 0-521-25900-2.
- Frederick Newberry: 'The Gray Champion‘: Hawthorne’s Ironic Criticism of Puritan Rebellion. In: Studies in Short Fiction 13, 1976. pp. 363–370.
- Frederick Newberry: Hawthorne’s Divided Loyalties: England and America in His Works. Fairleigh Dickinson University Press, Rutherford NJ 1987, ISBN 0-8386-3274-2.
- Lea Bertani Vozar Newman: A Reader’s Guide to the Short Stories of Nathaniel Hawthorne. G. K. Hall & Co., Boston 1979, ISBN 0-8161-8398-8.
- G. Harrison Orians: The Angel of Hadley in Fiction. In: American Literature 4:3, 1932. pp. 257–269.
- G. R. Thompson: The Art of Authorial Presence: Hawthorne’s Provincial Tales. Duke University Press, Durham, N.C. 1993, ISBN 0-8223-1321-9.
