= Angel of Hadley =

Legendary figure

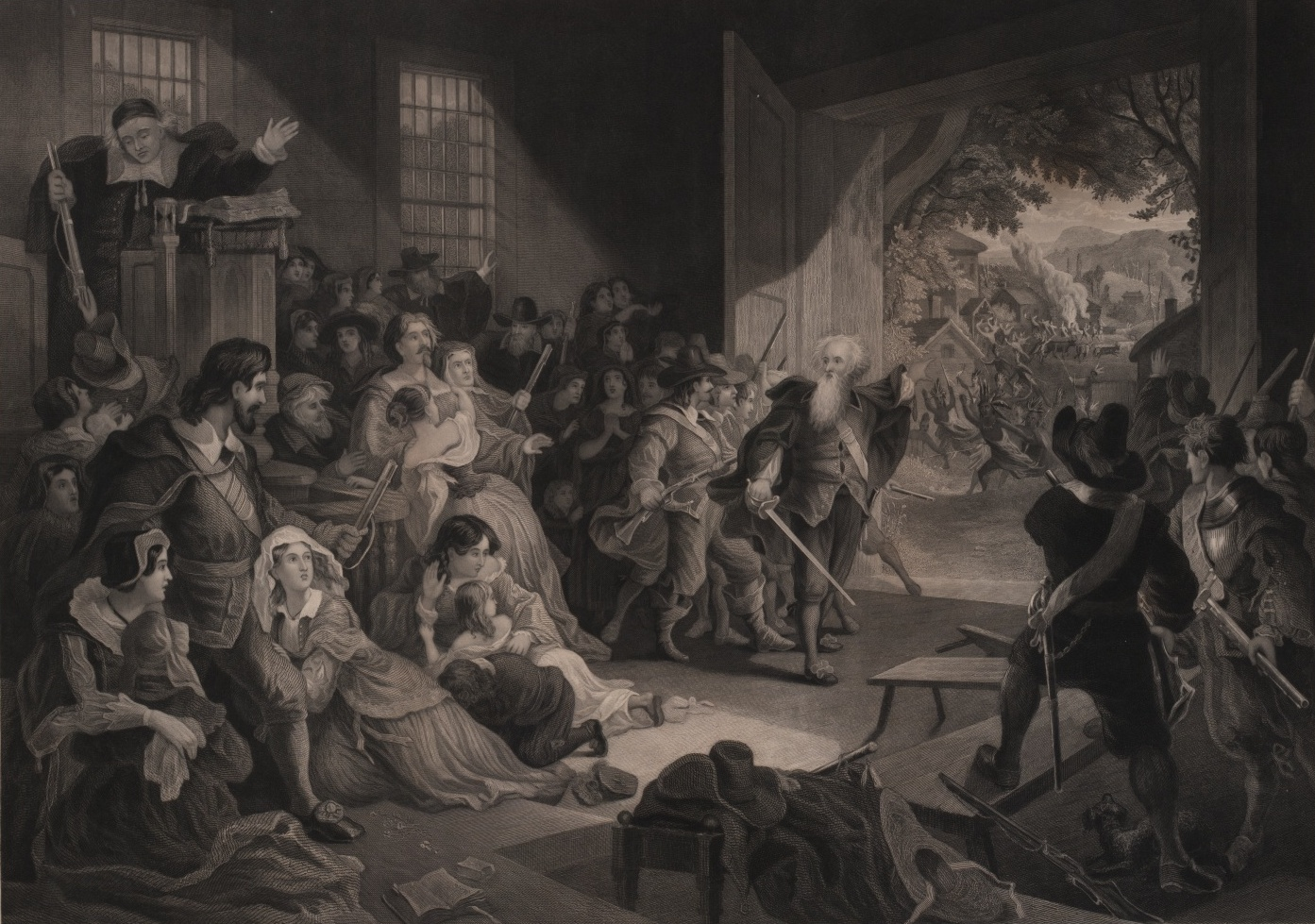
Engraving based on a painting by Frederick Chapman depicting the legend. The original painting hangs in the Forbes Library in Northampton, Massachusetts.

The Angel of Hadley is the central character in a possibly apocryphal tale combining the execution of Charles I in England, King Philip's War and Hadley, Massachusetts. According to the tale Colonel William Goffe, who was wanted for his role in the regicide, was hiding in Hadley when it was attacked by Indians in 1675 or 1676. Goffe, by then an aging figure, is said to have come out of his hiding to lead the local residents in the successful defense of their community against the attack.

The story contains many kernels of truth, although some appear to have been deliberately obscured by chroniclers of the time (notably Increase Mather) in order to protect Goffe. There is strong evidence that he was in Hadley at the times of various attacks on Hadley, and many of the political and military leaders involved, as well as chroniclers of the time, knew of his presence and sympathized with his plight. There are inconsistent accounts about which attack he would have been involved in, and uncertainty about the location of troops that are conventionally claimed to have fought off the attackers.

== The legend ==
King Philip's War broke out in southern New England in 1675 following disputes between Metacom (called King Phillip by the English) the leader of the Wampanoag tribe, and the English colonies. The war raged across southern New England in 1675, and numerous English frontier towns were attacked. According to the legend, one such attack was made against Hadley, Massachusetts, most commonly described as occurring on September 1, 1675. With all hope seemingly lost, a white-bearded man with a powerful bearing and wielding an old sword suddenly appeared. He organized the town militia before leading them to victory against the more numerous natives. He then disappeared.

== Factual background ==
=== William Goffe ===
William Goffe (born between 1613 and 1618) was a Parliamentarian military officer during the English Civil War of the 1640s, rising to Lieutenant-General. He was one of 59 signatories to the death warrant of King Charles I in 1649, and continued to play an influential role in the English government during The Protectorate rule of Oliver Cromwell in the 1650s. In 1660 Charles II was restored to the throne. Although many opponents of crown rule were granted amnesty, the regicides were specifically excluded. Goffe and his father-in-law Edward Whalley, another regicide, fled to New England. They were well known to Increase Mather and Daniel Gookin among others, and were able to move freely in Boston until it was known that Charles II was likely to order their arrest. Goffe and Whalley fled to the New Haven Colony, where John Davenport, a sympathetic minister, sheltered them for a time, and the political leadership disclaimed knowledge of their whereabouts. It is likely that Davenport connected them with John Russell, the minister at Hadley, Massachusetts, where the two men eventually settled into a highly secluded life. Only a small number of people are believed to have known where they were.

Goffe was able to exchange letters with his wife in England through the mediation of Increase Mather, an influential Boston minister, and Daniel Gookin, a political leader in the Massachusetts government, is known to have overseen some of their financial affairs. Edward Whalley is believed to have died in roughly 1675; Goffe reported that he had suffered a stroke and was not in good condition. Goffe is assumed to have been in Hadley during some of the attacks made on the town during the war; however, by the later months of 1676 letters he sent indicated that he had relocated to the Hartford, Connecticut area, where he is assumed to have died some years later.

=== Military movements ===
There were two supposed attacks on Hadley that have been connected to the legend. The first occurred on September 1, 1675, and the second on June 12, 1676. Increase Mather, who wrote one of the first accounts of the war, described the September 1 event as an "alarm", implying that there was no actual attack, merely an urgent notice that an attack had taken place somewhere nearby. He gave a slightly more detailed account of the June 12 action, in which he implied (but did not explicitly state) that militia troops from Connecticut who had been stationed nearby were instrumental in fending off the Indian attack.

There is some uncertainty about where the Connecticut troops were on the day of the attack. They had been sent north as part of a planned sweep of the Connecticut River valley, to be performed in conjunction with Massachusetts troops that were en route from the east. They were known to have arrived at Hadley a few days before June 12, but there is significant evidence that on the day of the attack they were across the river in Northampton.

== Potential coverup ==
A significant number of people involved in the events surrounding the June 12 action, and the later reporting of it, had knowledge of Goffe's presence in Hadley. Major John Talcott, who led the Connecticut forces, was a brother-in-law of John Russell, who was sheltering them. The governor of Massachusetts was John Leverett, who had served in the Parliamentary Army during the civil war, and is known to have visited Hadley during the time Goffe and Whalley were there. Increase Mather, as one of the intermediaries handling their letters, wrote one of the most important early accounts of the war. The political leaders of the Connecticut Colony at the time were Robert Treat and William Leete, who had been leaders in the New Haven Colony when Goffe and Whalley passed through there.

Historian Douglas Wilson suggests that at least some of these people, all of whom were sympathetic to Goffe, may have acted, either independently or in concert, to cover up any role Goffe may have had in the June 12 action. There are no significant records of the action in surviving Massachusetts and Connecticut records. Wilson notes that there is a letter, discovered in 1870, from John Russell to Increase Mather, dated 1677, after Mather's publication of his history. Russell wrote "I find nothing considerable mistaken in your history. That which I most fear in the matter is lest Mr. B or some of Connecticut should clash with ours and contradict each other in the story as to matter of fact." Wilson concludes that "Mr. B" was probably Gershom Bulkeley, a political opponent of the Puritans who was part of Talcott's force.

== Historiography and influences on fiction ==
The first publication of the angel tale was apparently in the late 18th century by Thomas Hutchinson in his History of the Province of Massachusetts Bay, in which he describes the tale as having originated with John Leverett's family. Subsequent historians picked up and elaborated on the story. Later in the 19th century historians began to examine the story more critically, with George Sheldon specifically debunking it in 1874. Because of the inconsistencies raised by Sheldon, many 20th-century historians have accepted that the tale does not describe an event that actually happened, and it has been widely propagated as not having occurred. Douglas Wilson carefully reassessed the available evidence, concluding in his 1987 paper on the matter that it might have taken place, and that the event, and Goffe's involvement in it, were covered up by Goffe's protectors.

The legend furnished ideas used by Sir Walter Scott in Peveril of the Peak and by James Fenimore Cooper in The Wept of Wish-ton-Wish. It is also a likely source for "The Gray Champion", a Nathaniel Hawthorne short story that features an elderly Puritan man who brandishes a sword in defense of his people. Jack Dunn wrote The Diary of General William Goffe published in 1982 which was syndicated in The Valley Advocate in weekly installments as "The Angel of Hadley".

Goffe is portrayed as The Angel of Hadley in Channel 4's New Worlds (2014), the sequel to 2008's The Devil's Whore (in North America, The Devil's Mistress).

A fictionalised version of the story forms part of Robert Harris's 2022 novel Act of Oblivion, in which Goffe is one of the main protagonists.

== See also ==
- Angel of Mons
