= Samuel Russell (Yale co-founder) =

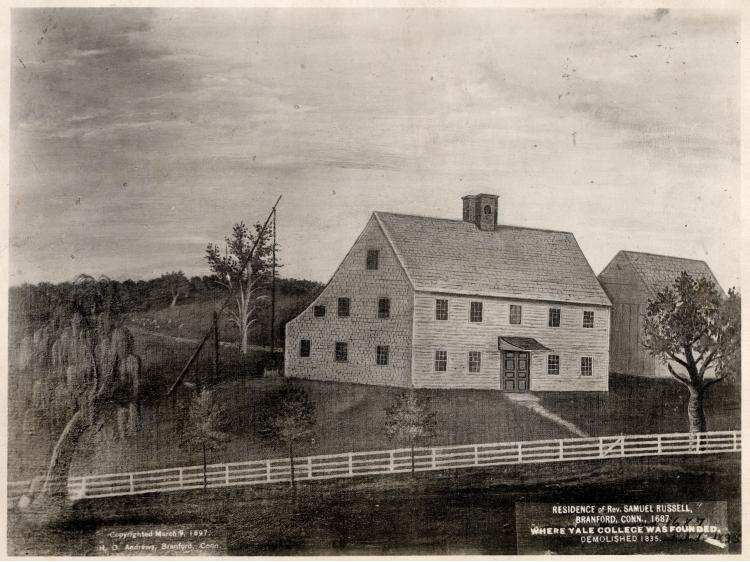
Residence of the Rev. Samuel Russell, Branford, Connecticut, where founders of Yale College met.

Samuel Russell (4 November 1660 – 24 June 1731) was one of the founders of Yale University.

He was born in Hadley, Massachusetts, the second son of the Rev. John Russell and Rebecca Newberry Russell.

He graduated from Harvard College in 1681 and was ordained while teaching at Hadley, Massachusetts. On 12 September 1687, he was elected pastor of the church at Branford, Connecticut, where he officiated for the remainder of his life. The founders of Yale University met in his study in Branford to contribute their books to the founding of the University. The doors of the Samuel Russell house in Branford are preserved in the 1742 Room of Sterling Memorial Library at Yale.
