= John Russell (clergyman) =

The Reverend John Russell, Jr.
- The Reverend John Russell behind the pulpit of the Church of Christ at Hadley during the 1675 Angel of Hadley Legend as depicted in the Frederick A. Chapman painting "The Perils of Our Forefathers"
- Born: 1626; Ipswich, England
- Died: December 10, 1692 (aged 65–66); Hadley, Massachusetts, US
- Occupation: Minister
- Children: John Russell (1650-1670), Jonathan Russell (1655-1711), The Rev. Samuel Russell (1660-1731), Eleazer Russell (1663-1691), Daniel Russell (1666-1667)
- Parent(s): John Russell, Sr. and Phebe Collins
- Relatives: President Rutherford B. Hayes (gr-gr-gr-gr-grandson)

John Russell (1626 – December 10, 1692) was a Puritan minister in Hadley, Massachusetts, during King Philip's War. As such, he is part of the Angel of Hadley legend.

== Life ==
John Russell was born on 1626 in Ipswich, Suffolk, England and immigrated to Cambridge, Massachusetts Bay Colony aboard The Defence in 1635 with his father and brother as part of the Great Migration. He graduated from Harvard College in 1645. In 1650 he succeeded Henry Smith as the minister at Wethersfield, Connecticut. Seven years later controversy erupted over church membership, discipline, and baptism, with the church in neighboring Hartford being inclined toward Presbyterianism as opposed to Congregationalism. The Congregationalist minority in Hartford attempted to join Russell's church in Wethersfield; when the General Corte prevented the move pending efforts at reconciliation, the controversy spilled over into Russell's congregation. Finally, on April 18, 1659, the majority of Russell's congregation signed an agreement to depart from Connecticut for Massachusetts.

In 1659 Russell led the dissenting Connecticut congregation that founded the town of Hadley on the east bank at a bend of the Connecticut River. Beginning in 1664, he sheltered the regicides Edward Whalley and William Goffe in his home. He secreted the two wanted men under the roof of his home for more than a decade at great peril to himself and his family, as King Charles II had numerous men searching the colonies for Whalley and Goffe. Whalley died about 1675. Goffe was still alive during King Philip's War when, according to the Angel of Hadley legend, he allegedly came out of hiding to rally the townspeople during an attack before disappearing again. George Sheldon in his introduction to Sylvester Judd's The History of Hadley dubbed John Russell the "Guardian Angel of Hadley" because of his lengthy and perilous watch over the two regicides. Sheldon eloquently wrote of Hadley's minister:

The greatest hero of Hadley, however, was of a still nobler and finer mold. Actuated by pure motives of humanity, sympathy and duty, and the loftiest pitch of patriotism, he patiently wrought in darkness and in silence. Through the anxious days and lingering nights of more than ten years, he bravely stood within a hand's breadth of the gates of ignominious death. He never faltered for a single hour, nor ever sought to shift upon another the burden and responsibility. Month after month, summer and winter, year after year, zealously watching and guarding his trust, John Russell was virtually a prisoner within his own hamlet. Under his very rooftree he was secreting Edward Whalley and William Goffe, two of the patriot judges who condemned to the scaffold that misguided and perfidious representative of the "divine right of kings," Charles I., of England. These two men were now proscribed; a price was set upon their heads, and a swift retribution awaited any who might relieve or conceal them. Any neglect of precaution, any unforeseen mishap to the premises, any single case of misplaced confidence, and both he and his guests were surely doomed to nameless torture and death.

== Family ==
Rev Russell was married to Mary Tayllcott and they had a son called John; he later married Rebecca Newberry and they had four sons; after Rebecca’s death, he married Phebe Grigson.

His son, The Rev. Samuel Russell of Branford, Connecticut, was one of the co-founders of Yale College.

== Legacy ==
Russell Street in Hadley is named after the Reverend Mr. Russell. Russell Street is more commonly known as Massachusetts Route 9.
