= William Goffe =

English regicide

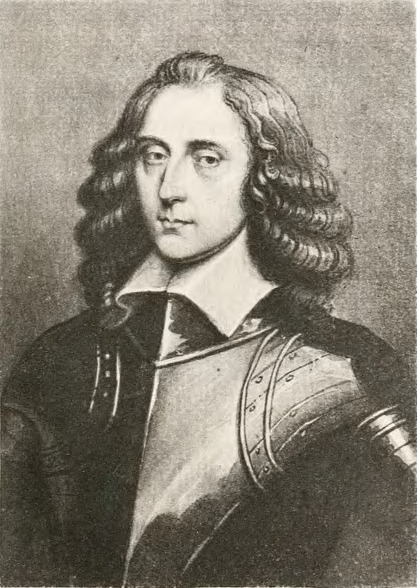

Member of Parliament for Hampshire
- In office September 1656 – February 1658

Rule of the Major-Generals, responsible for Berkshire, Sussex and Hampshire
- In office November 1655 – January 1657

Member of Parliament for Yarmouth
- In office September 1654 – January 1655

Personal details
- Born: c. 1613 to 1618 Uncertain, probably Sussex
- Died: c. 1679 New England
- Resting place: Thought to be Hadley, Massachusetts
- Spouse: Frances Whalley (c. 1650)
- Children: Anne; Elizabeth; Frances

Military service
- Rank: Major General
- Battles/wars: Wars of the Three Kingdoms; Relief of Gloucester; First Newbury; Lostwithiel; Second Newbury; Battle of Naseby; Langport; Bridgwater; Siege of Bristol (1645); Siege of Berkeley Castle; Torrington; Siege of Oxford; Siege of Pembroke; Preston; Dunbar; Worcester; Penruddock uprising

William Goffe, c. 1613/1618 - 1679/1680, was a religious radical from London who fought for Parliament during the Wars of the Three Kingdoms. Nicknamed “Praying William” by contemporaries, he was a leading advocate of putting Charles I on trial and later approved his execution in January 1649. He escaped prosecution as a regicide after the 1660 Stuart Restoration by fleeing to the New England Colonies.

Goffe held several senior military and political positions under the Commonwealth, including administrator of Berkshire, Sussex and Hampshire during the Rule of the Major-Generals from 1655 to 1657. A close associate of Oliver Cromwell, to whom he was distantly related by marriage, he lost most of his political influence after Richard Cromwell resigned as Lord Protector in April 1659.

Shortly before the Restoration in May 1660, Goffe sailed for Boston with his father-in-law and fellow regicide General Edward Whalley. Sheltered by Puritan sympathisers in New England, little is known for certain of his life there. It was once suggested he was the Angel of Hadley, a figure who in 1675 allegedly helped repulse an attack by Native Americans, but this is disputed on various grounds. He died sometime after April 1679, the date of his last known letter to his wife, and is thought to have been buried in Hadley, Massachusetts.

== Personal details ==
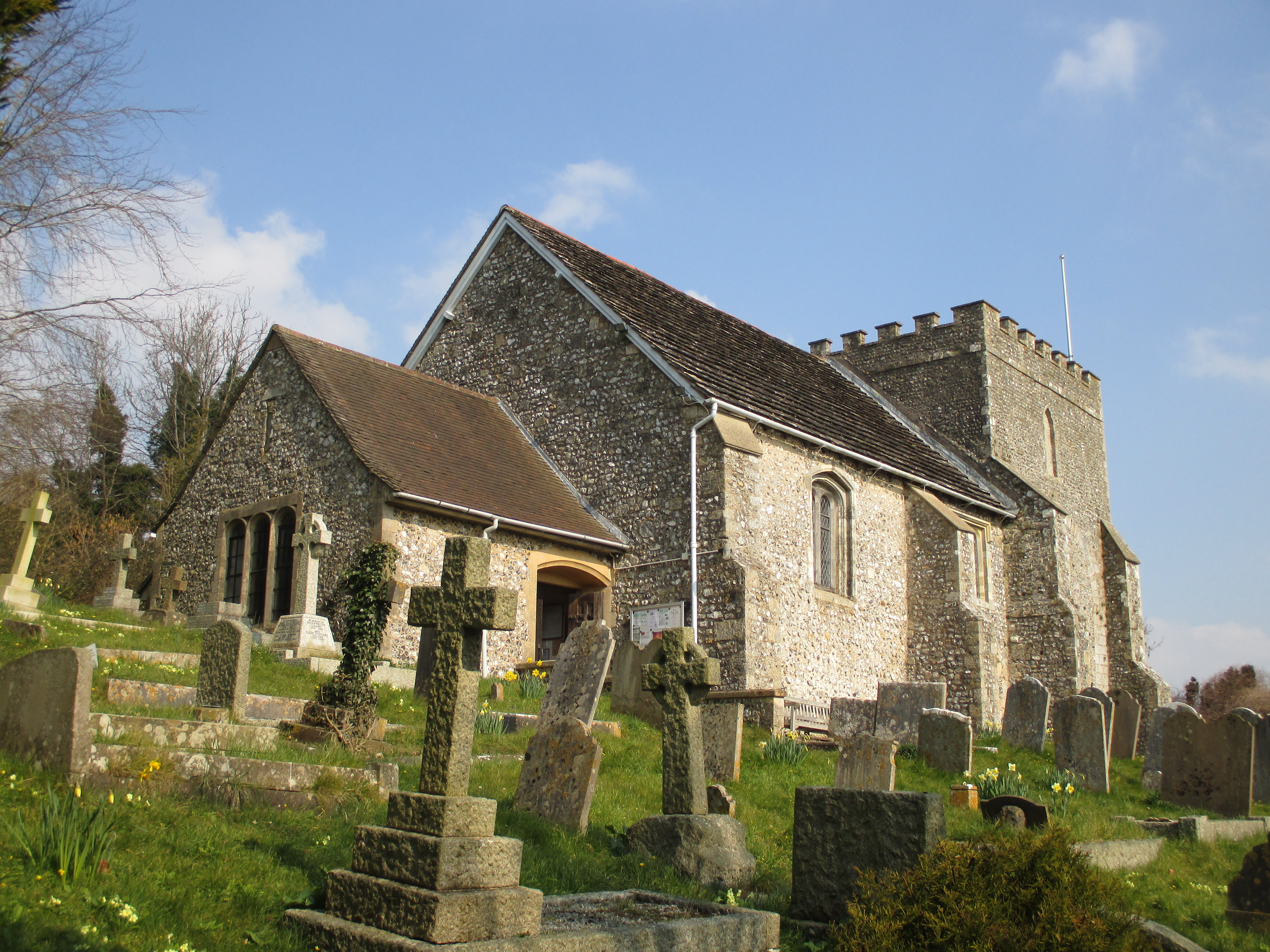
St Nicholas' Church, Bramber, where Goffe's father was parish priest until c. 1607

William Goffe was the fourth of five sons born to The Reverend Stephen Goffe (1575–after 1628), and his wife Deborah (1587–1626). The precise date and location of his birth are uncertain; his father was rector of Bramber, Sussex, but lost this position in 1607 for his part in organising a Puritan petition to James I.

His eldest brother Stephen (1605–1681), was baptised in the nearby village of Stanmer, while his mother was buried there in 1626, so Sussex seems most likely. (Note: One 19th century researcher claimed his birthplace was Haverfordwest in Wales, a suggestion repeated by author Robert Harris in Act of Oblivion, but this appears to be based on misreading "Goffe" as "Gough") William was probably born between 1613 and 1618, since he became an apprentice in 1634, the maximum age for which was 21, and admitted to the Worshipful Company of Grocers as a freeman in 1642, the minimum age being 24.

As for his brothers, Stephen and John attended Merton College, Oxford, and like their father became priests in the Church of England. During the Wars of the Three Kingdoms, Stephen acted as a Royalist agent in Europe and converted to Catholicism in 1654, while John was removed from his living in Hackington, Kent, for refusing to subscribe to the Presbyterian-inspired 1643 Solemn League and Covenant. James (1611–1656) joined the Worshipful Company of Leathersellers, while Timothy (1626-after 1649) reportedly worked as a Ship chandler.

Sometime around 1650, Goffe married Frances Whalley (1635–1684?), daughter of General Edward Whalley, a cousin of Oliver Cromwell; they had three daughters, Anne, Elizabeth, and Frances.

== Wars of the Three Kingdoms ==
In 1634, Goffe was contracted as an Apprentice to William Vaughan, a Presbyterian London drysalter, and member of the Company of Grocers. In early 1642, he was briefly imprisoned for organising a petition demanding that control of the London Trained Bands be transferred from Charles I to Parliament. The First English Civil War began in August, and by July 1643 Goffe was serving as a captain in an infantry regiment led by Colonel Harry Barclay, a Scottish veteran of the Thirty Years' War. Raised in autumn 1642 to reinforce the Parliamentarian field army commanded by the Earl of Essex, in 1643 this unit helped lift the Siege of Gloucester and fought at the First Battle of Newbury. During the 1644 Western Campaign, it was among the 5,000 troops forced to surrender at Lostwithiel in August, but released in time for the Second Battle of Newbury in September. (Note: Surrender terms allowed the prisoners free passage back to Parliamentarian-held territory)

Key locations mentioned in article

Along with his regiment, Goffe transferred to the New Model Army in April 1645, with Edward Harley taking over from Barclay as colonel. (Note: The influence of political and religious radicals within the New Model officer corps meant the Covenanter government viewed it with considerable suspicion, and ordered Scots like Barclay to resign their commissions as a result) Over the next year, this formation served in numerous actions, including the battles of Naseby, Langport and Torrington, as well as the sieges of Bridgwater, Bristol, Berkeley Castle and Exeter. The surrender of Oxford in June 1646 brought the First Civil War to a close, with the exception of a few isolated Royalist garrisons that held out until 1647.

However, victory resulted in increasingly bitter disputes over the post-war political settlement between radicals within the New Model like Cromwell, and moderate MPs in Parliament, the most prominent being Denzil Holles. In July 1647, Goffe was part of a military deputation which demanded Parliament suspend eleven MPs identified as key opponents of the army. As well as Holles, they included Harley, who was replaced as colonel by Thomas Pride, with Goffe promoted to major. (Note: This may have simply formalised the existing situation, since Harley missed the Naseby campaign after being wounded in April 1645, then served as Governor of Canon Frome from August 1645 to February 1646)

Like fellow New Model officers such as Generals Thomas Harrison and Robert Overton, both members of the Christian millennialist sect known as the Fifth Monarchists, Goffe was convinced the Second Coming was imminent. This belief influenced his interventions in the Putney Debates, held in late 1647 to reconcile competing demands from different army factions on the details of the peace settlement. Goffe argued Charles I should be put on trial, and suggested those in favour of continuing negotiations with him were preventing the return of Jesus Christ by "thwarting God's will". Since these discussions were being led by Cromwell, who strongly believed all his actions were directed by God, he demanded an apology from Goffe for what he considered a personal insult.

When the Second English Civil War broke out in 1648, Goffe's regiment was part of the force which put down the rising in South Wales, including the recapture of Pembroke Castle in April. This was followed by the defeat of the Scottish Engager army at Preston in August, which effectively ended the rebellion. Now a Lieutenant Colonel, Goffe and others argued the renewed fighting was "God's punishment" for failing to bring the king to "justice", a viewpoint which had been adopted by Cromwell. In December 1648, Pride's Purge excluded MPs who opposed doing so, and the reduced body known as the Rump Parliament accordingly voted to put Charles on trial. Goffe was one of the fifty-nine judges who approved his execution in January 1649. His Royalist brother Stephen, then serving as chaplain to the exiled Stuart court in The Hague, was chosen to inform Charles II of his father's death.

Although Charles was king of both Scotland and England, the Scottish government was not consulted. In 1650, they responded by crowning his son king of Scotland, and agreeing to restore him to the English throne, leading to the Anglo-Scottish War. Goffe commanded Cromwell's own infantry regiment at Dunbar in September 1650, and was subsequently promoted its colonel, then fought at Worcester a year later, two victories that ended the war. Charles II escaped to the Dutch Republic, but defeat resulted in Scotland being incorporated into the Commonwealth of England in 1653, and confirmed Cromwell's position as leader of the new republic.

== The Interregnum ==
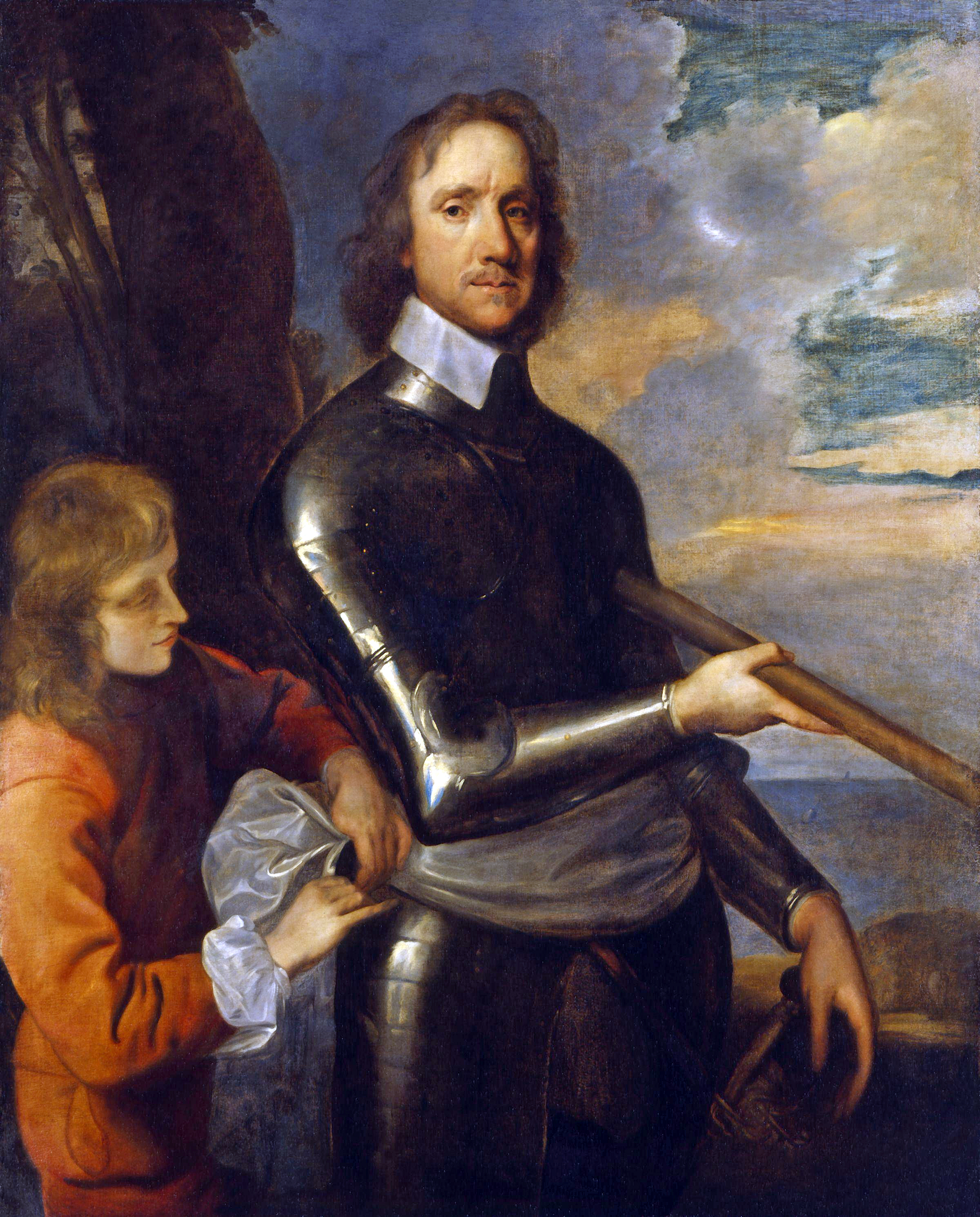
Portrait of Oliver Cromwell, c. 1649; Goffe was one of his most loyal supporters

Rewarded for his service with grants of former Crown lands in Hertfordshire, Goffe backed the dismissal of the Rump in April 1653, and its replacement with a nominated body known as Barebone's Parliament. However, he supported Parliament's dissolution in December 1653, and Cromwell's subsequent appointment as Lord Protector. These actions marked his break with former New Model colleagues, both Fifth Monarchist sympathisers like Thomas Harrison, and republicans such as Edmund Ludlow. (Note: Ludlow later described him as "Cromwell's creature") Goffe became one of The Protectorate's most loyal supporters, and was elected MP for Great Yarmouth in the 1654 First Protectorate Parliament.

In early 1655, he helped suppress the pro-Royalist Penruddock uprising, and was promoted major general in October 1655; during the Rule of the Major-Generals, he served as administrator for the region composed of Berkshire, Sussex, and Hampshire. The regime proved both unpopular and expensive, and when elections for a new Parliament were held in September 1656, Goffe was returned as MP for Hampshire. This failed to resolve disputes over the constitutional settlement; one solution was to make Cromwell king, an offer he ultimately refused. Whether Goffe actively supported the idea, or simply accepted it, is unclear.

The new constitution included a second chamber for the first time since the abolition of the House of Lords in 1649. Known as Cromwell's Other House, it included 63 nominated individuals, including Goffe. However, only 42 of the 63 accepted, while Parliament was determined to kill the Other House at birth. As a result, it was dissolved in February 1658 without anything other than a preliminary meeting. When Cromwell died in September, Goffe transferred allegiance to his son and successor as Lord Protector, Richard Cromwell, whose inability to control either Parliament or the New Model led to his resignation in May 1659. This ended Goffe's period of influence, although during their struggle with the re-installed Rump Parliament, the military-backed Committee of Safety made him part of a four-man delegation sent in November to seek support from George Monck, military governor in Scotland. This proved unsuccessful.

== Exile and death ==
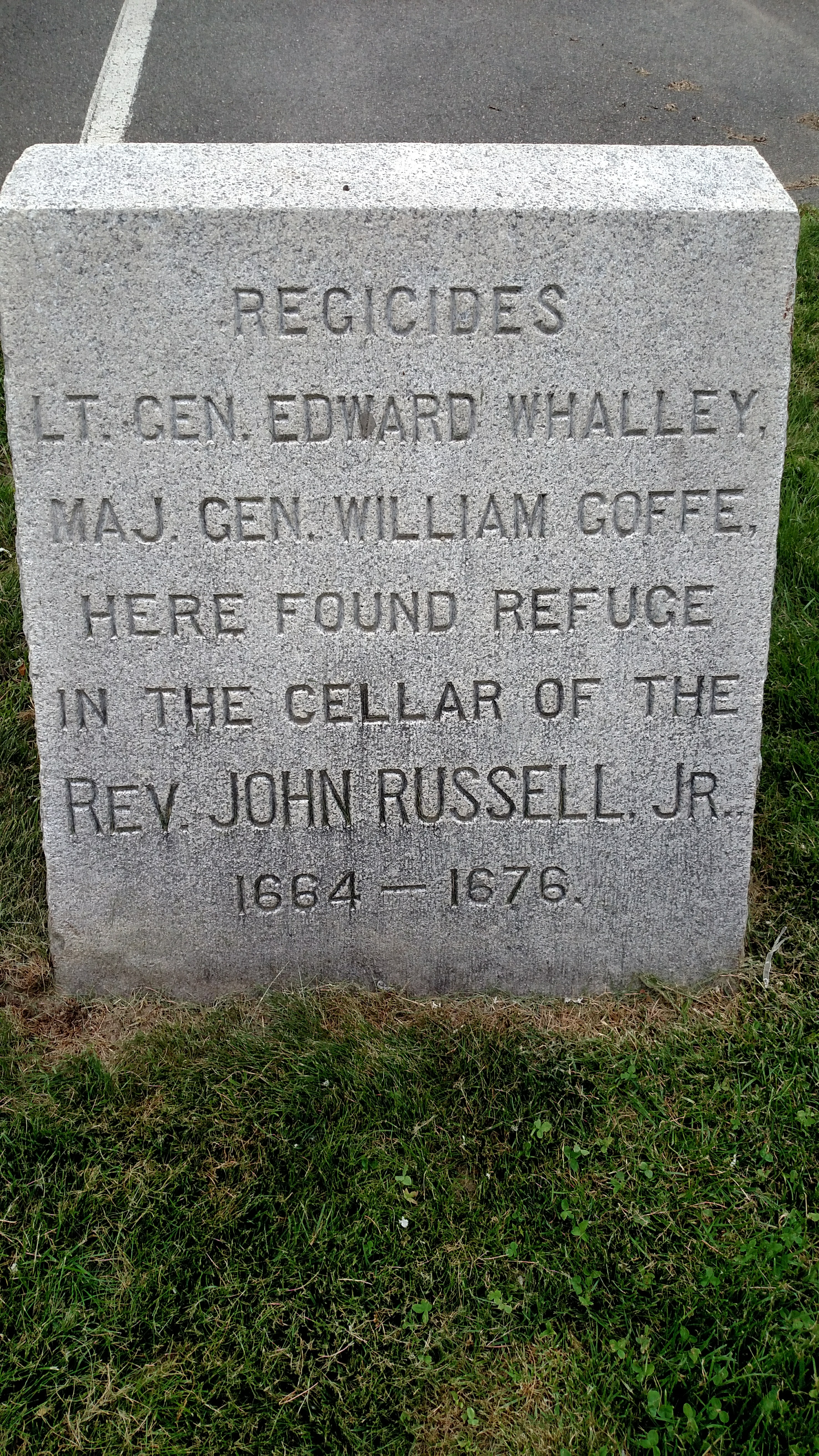
Memorial commemorating the location in Hadley, Massachusetts, where Whalley & Goffe are alleged to have been sheltered

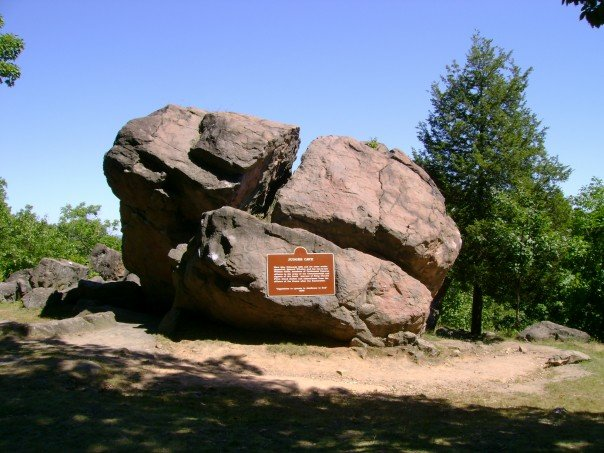
Judges' Cave, where Goffe and Edward Whalley reputedly hid during the early part of their exile in New England

In negotiations leading up to the 1660 Stuart Restoration, a general pardon was agreed for all "crimes" committed since 1642, with certain exceptions, including the regicides. Aware that they faced prosecution and probable execution, Goffe and his father-in-law Edward Whalley sailed for Boston, Massachusetts on 13 May 1660, one day before warrants were issued for their arrest. Arriving on 27 July, one writer has claimed "they were the most prominent public officials from the Mother country ever to land in New England". They initially lived openly in Cambridge, where they stayed with Daniel Gookin, a prominent member of the colonial administration.

However, at the end of November it was confirmed that they had been excluded from the Indemnity and Oblivion Act passed by Parliament in August, (Note: The original draft of the bill listed only nine regicides as being liable to prosecution, neither Goffe or Whalley being among them) making it impolitic for the Massachusetts authorities to openly protect them. In March 1661, the two fugitives moved on to New Haven, Connecticut, where they were later joined by another regicide, John Dixwell. Here they were housed by the local Puritan minister, John Davenport, before Royalist agents arrived in May seeking to arrest them. Forewarned by local sympathisers, Goffe and Whalley evaded their pursuers by hiding in Judges' Cave, where they spent most of the next few years.

In 1664, fresh efforts to arrest Whalley and Goffe meant they relocated to Hadley, Massachusetts, where they were sheltered by John Russell. Thereafter, very little is known for certain of their life, although Goffe's letters to his wife Frances make it clear he retained his religious and political convictions. Based on these letters and papers discovered a century later, he and Whalley built up a small trading business, and were prosperous enough for Goffe to tell Frances not to send any more money. Whalley died sometime between 1674 and 1675.

In the 19th century, Goffe was suggested as a candidate for being the Angel of Hadley, who in 1675 supposedly helped repulse an attack on the town by Native Americans. However, whether this incident even took place remains disputed, let alone Goffe's involvement. In 1676, he reportedly left Hadley for Hartford, Connecticut; his last letter to Frances is dated April 1679, and he probably died shortly thereafter. He is thought to have been buried next to his father-in-law in an unmarked grave at Hadley. (Note: In his 1848 "Pictorial Field Book of the Revolution", Benson Lossing sketched the alleged gravestones of the three regicides in the churchyard attached to the Center Church on the Green. Goffe's marker is inscribed "80 M G", the "M" supposedly being an inversion of "W", his first initial)

== Legacy ==
Various towns in New England have streets commemorating Dixwell, Whalley and Goffe, including Hadley and New Haven.

Goffe is portrayed as The Angel of Hadley in Channel 4's New Worlds (2014), the sequel to 2008's The Devil's Whore.

Goffe and Whalley are protagonists in British author Robert Harris’s 2022 novel Act of Oblivion, which depicts their flight across New England.

== Sources ==
- Cooper, Thompson (2004). "Goffe [Gough], Stephen (1605–1681)". Oxford Dictionary of National Biography (online ed.). Oxford University Press. doi:10.1093/ref:odnb/10901. (Subscription, Wikipedia Library access or UK public library membership required.)
- Durston, Christopher (2008) [2004]. "Goffe, William (d. 1679?)". Oxford Dictionary of National Biography (online ed.). Oxford University Press. doi:10.1093/ref:odnb/10903. (Subscription, Wikipedia Library access or UK public library membership required.)
- Furgol, Edward (2002). Kenyon, John; Ohlmeyer, Jane (eds.). The Civil Wars in Scotland in The Civil Wars: A Military History of England, Scotland and Ireland 1638–1660. Oxford University Press. ISBN 978-0-19-280278-1.
- Hanson, Robert Brand (1976). Dedham, Massachusetts, 1635-1890. Dedham Historical Society.
- Hutton, Ronald (2021). The Making of Oliver Cromwell. Yale University Press. ISBN 978-0300257458.
- Gentles, Ian (2002). Kenyon, John; Ohlmeyer, Jane (eds.). The Civil Wars in England in The Civil Wars; a Military History of England, Scotland and Ireland 1638-1660. OUP. ISBN 978-0192802781.
- Greaves, Richard (2004). "Goffe [Gough], John (in or before 1610–1661)". Oxford Dictionary of National Biography (online ed.). Oxford University Press. doi:10.1093/ref:odnb/10900. (Subscription, Wikipedia Library access or UK public library membership required.)
- Jordan, Don; Walsh, Michael (2012). The King's Revenge; Charles II and the greatest manhunt in British history. Little, Brown. ISBN 978-1408703274.
- Ludlow, Edmund (1888). Firth, C.H (ed.). Memoirs, Volume 2.
- Manganiello, Stephen C (2004). The Concise Encyclopedia of the Revolutions and Wars of England, Scotland, and Ireland, 1639-1660. Scarecrow Press. ISBN 978-0810851009.
- Noble, Mark (1797). Memoirs of the Protectoral-house of Cromwell: Volume I. JJ Robinson.
- Phillips, James (1892). "William Goffe the regicide". The English Historical Review. VII (XXVIII): 717–720. doi:10.1093/ehr/VII.XXVIII.717.
- Reece, Henry (2013). The Army in Cromwellian England, 1649-1660. OUP. ISBN 978-0198200635.
- Royle, Trevor (2004). Civil War: the Wars of the Three Kingdoms 1638-1660 (2006 ed.). Abacus. ISBN 978-0349115641.
- Wallis, Patrick (2019). Apprenticeship in England in Apprenticeship in Early Modern Europe. CUP. ISBN 978-1108690188.
- Wanklyn, Malcolm (2014). "Choosing Officers for the New Model Army February to April 1645". Journal of the Society for Army Historical Research. 92 (370): 109–125. JSTOR 44232556.
- Wanklyn, Malcolm (2015). Reconstructing the New Model Army Volume I; Regimental Lists April 1645 to May 1649. Helion and Company. ISBN 978-1910777107.
- Wilson, Douglas (1987). "Web of Secrecy: Goffe, Whalley, and the Legend of Hadley". New England Quarterly. 60 (4): 515–548. doi:10.2307/365416. JSTOR 365416.
