= Bishopsgate mutiny =

The Bishopsgate mutiny occurred in April 1649 when soldiers of Colonel Edward Whalley's regiment of the New Model Army refused to obey orders and leave London. At the end of the mutiny one soldier, a supporter of the Levellers, Robert Lockyer, was executed by firing squad.

In January 1649 Charles I of England was tried and executed for treason against the people. In February the Grandees (senior officers) banned petitions to Parliament by soldiers. In March eight Leveller troopers went to the Commander-in-Chief of the New Model Army, Lord Thomas Fairfax, and demanded the restoration of the right to petition. Five of them were cashiered out of the army.

300 infantrymen of Colonel John Hewson's regiment, who declared that they would not serve in Ireland until the Leveller programme had been realised, were cashiered without arrears of pay, which was the threat that had been used to quell the Corkbush Field mutiny.

When soldiers of the regiment of Colonel Edward Whalley stationed in Bishopsgate, London made similar demands they were ordered out of London. They refused to go, fearing that once outside the City of London they too would be given the choice of obey or be cashiered without arrears of pay. The mutineers surrendered after a personal appeal by Fairfax and Oliver Cromwell. Fifteen soldiers were arrested and court martialed, of whom six were sentenced to death. Five were pardoned but Robert Lockyer, a former Agitator within the regiment, was executed by firing squad in front of St Paul's Cathedral on April 27, 1649.

Like the funeral of Colonel Thomas Rainsborough the previous year, Lockyer's funeral was a massive Leveller-led demonstration in London, with thousands of mourners wearing the Levellers' ribbons of sea-green and bunches of rosemary for remembrance in their hats.

== Also See ==
- The English Civil War
- The Banbury mutiny 17 May 1649.
