= Stephen Goffe =

Stephen Goffe, C.O. (Gough) (b. 1605; d. at Paris, Christmas Day, 1681), was a Royalist agent of the Wars of the Three Kingdoms, and later an Oratorian priest.

== Life ==
Goffe was educated at Merton College, Oxford, becoming M.A. in 1627. He took orders and became chaplain to Colonel Vere's regiment in the Low Countries.

Subsequently, Henry Jermyn, 1st Earl of St Albans obtained Goffe's appointment as one of the chaplains to Charles I of England, in which capacity he was created D.D. in 1636. He was often employed in secret negotiations in France, Flanders, and Holland. He was rector of Herstmonceaux from 1639.

During the Civil War Goffe was arrested and charged with attempting to rescue the king, then a prisoner at Hampton Court. After the execution of the king (whose death-warrant was signed by Stephen's brother William), he went to France, where he became a Catholic. Dodd and other Catholics have disproved the story that the Sorbonne admitted the validity of his Anglican orders.

Goffe became a member of the Oratory of Jesus and Mary (French Oratory) 14 January 1651, at Notre-Dame-des Vertues near Paris, where he became superior in 1655. Here he helped English exiles, both Protestants and Catholics, using his influence with Queen Henrietta Maria on their behalf; and on her appointment he acted as tutor to the young Duke of Monmouth.

Goffe was a learned man and maintained a correspondence with Vossius and other scholars. Some of his letters were printed by Paulus Colomesius (Paul Colomiès) in 1690, and others, still in manuscript, are in the British Museum (Addit. MS. 6394).

== Family ==
He was the son of Stephen Goffe, Protestant rector of Stanmer in Sussex, and brother of William Goffe. He outlived his wife Penelope Blount, daughter of Sir Saint John Blount KB.
