= Robert Lockyer =

English soldier

Robert Lockyer (sometimes spelled Lockier) (1625 – 27 April 1649) was an English soldier in Oliver Cromwell's New Model Army. A Leveller, he was the only soldier executed for his involvement in the Bishopsgate mutiny.

Lockyer has been identified with the son of Mary Lockyer, a resident of St. Botulph Bishopsgate who, with her son, was known to have been a Strict Baptist by 1642. In the same year, Lockyer certainly joined the Parliamentary Army. He served in the regiment of Edward Whalley during the turmoil at the end of the decade; by this time he was already deeply committed to Leveller ideas. When some of the troops under Captain John Savage were removed to Essex (apparently in order to remove them from Leveller agitation in central London), Lockyer helped incite a brief mutiny. On 24 April 1649, he and some other soldiers took the regimental colors and barricaded themselves inside a Leveller meeting-place in Bishopsgate. The soldiers' complaints were more practical than ideological: they refused to leave unless paid overdue wages.

The arrival of Thomas Fairfax and Cromwell on the scene put an end to the brief insurrection. Fairfax singled out Lockyer for punishment, as the presumed ringleader. On 27 April, despite efforts by John Lilburne and Richard Overton to spare his life, Lockyer was executed by firing squad in the yard of St Paul's Cathedral. He refused to place a bandage over his eyes as he faced his end. His funeral procession was reportedly attended by more than four thousand people, many wearing green ribbons to signal their allegiance to Leveller ideas. The affair crystallized popular discontent with Cromwell's martial law, and Lockyer's memory was invoked by the mutineers at Banbury later the same year.
