= Siege of Exeter =

The siege of Exeter may refer to:

- The Mercian Siege of Exeter (c. 630), also known as the Siege of Caer-Uisc. Almost certainly fictional.
- The Danish Siege of Exeter (893)
- The Siege of Exeter (1068), during the Norman Conquest of England
- The Siege of Exeter (1549) which took place during the Prayer Book Rebellion
- One of the sieges of Exeter that took place during the First English Civil War:
  - in 1642-3, by the Royalists
  - in 1645–6, by the Parliamentarians
