= Hadley, Massachusetts =

- Town
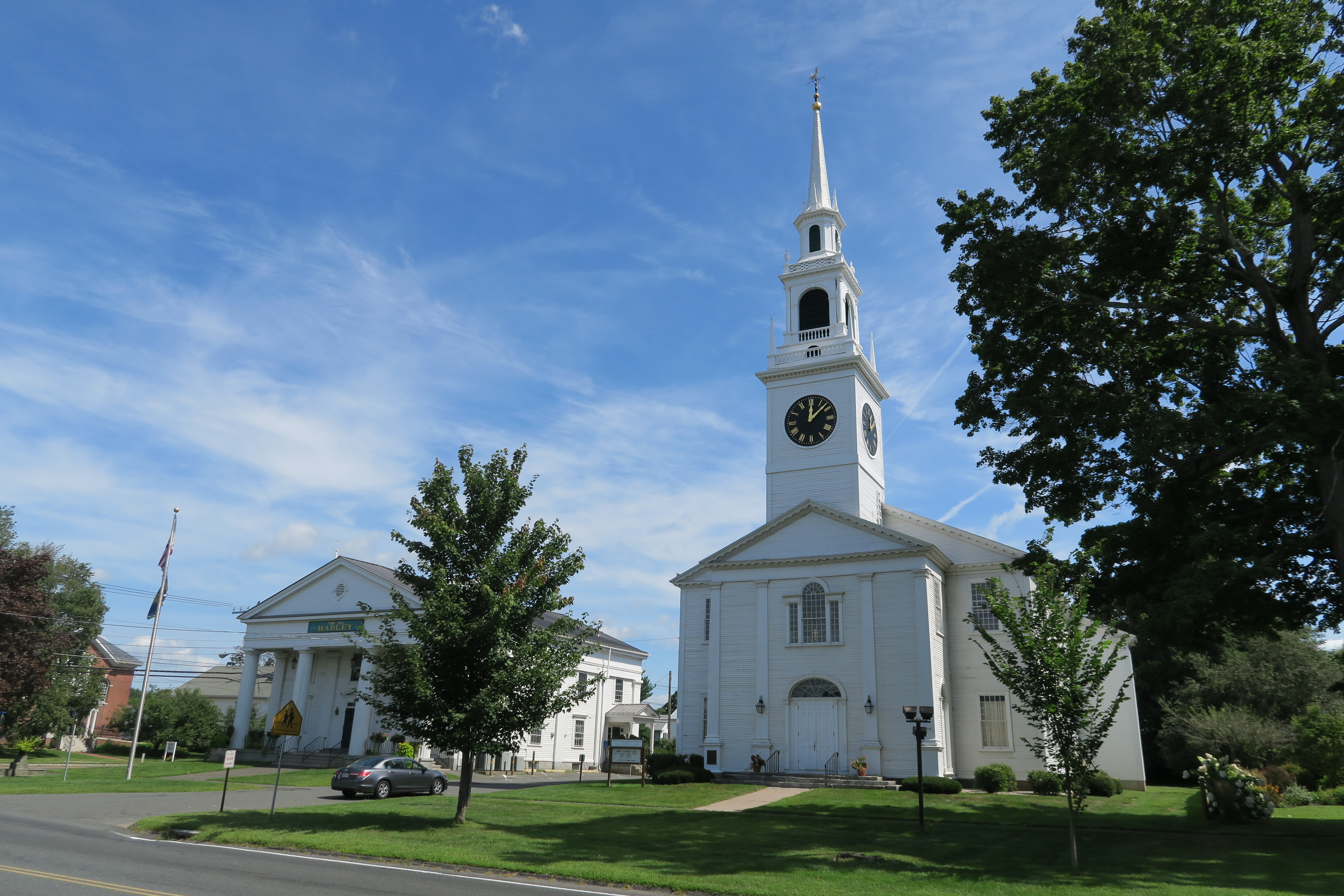
- Town Hall and First Congregational Church

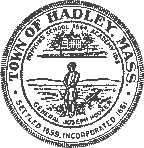
- Seal
- Nicknames: "The Breadbasket of Massachusetts" "Asparagus Capital of the World"
- Location in Hampshire County in Massachusetts
- Coordinates: 42°20′30″N 72°35′20″W
- Country: United States
- State: Massachusetts
- County: Hampshire
- Settled: 1659
- Incorporated: May 22, 1661

Government
  - Type: Open town meeting

Area
  - Total: 24.6 sq mi (63.7 km^{2})
  - Land: 23.1 sq mi (59.8 km^{2})
  - Water: 1.5 sq mi (3.9 km^{2})
- Elevation: 128 ft (39 m)

Population (2020)
  - Total: 5,325
  - Density: 231/sq mi (89.0/km^{2})
- Time zone: UTC−5 (Eastern)
  - Summer (DST): UTC−4 (Eastern)
- ZIP Code: 01035
- Area code: 413
- FIPS code: 25-27690
- GNIS feature ID: 0618201
- Website: www.hadleyma.org

Hadley (/ˈhædli/, HAD-lee) is a town in Hampshire County, Massachusetts, United States. The population was 5,325 at the 2020 census. It is part of the Springfield, Massachusetts Metropolitan Statistical Area. The area around the Hampshire and Mountain Farms Malls along Route 9 is a major shopping destination for the surrounding communities.

== History ==
=== Early ===
Hadley was first settled in 1659 and was officially incorporated in 1661. The former Norwottuck was renamed for Hadleigh, Suffolk. Its settlers were primarily a discontented group of families from the Puritan colonies of Hartford and Wethersfield, Connecticut, who petitioned to start a new colony up north after some controversy over doctrine in the local church. The settlement was led by John Russell. The first settler inside of Hadley was Nathaniel Dickinson, who surveyed the streets of what is now Hadley, Hatfield, and Amherst. At the time, Hadley encompassed a wide radius of land on both sides of the Connecticut River (but mostly on the eastern shore) including much of what would become known as the Equivalent Lands. In the following century, these were broken off into precincts and eventually the separate towns of Hatfield, Amherst, South Hadley, Granby and Belchertown. The early histories of these towns are, as a result, filed under the history of Hadley.

Lt. Gen. Edward Whalley and Maj. Gen. William Goffe, two Puritan generals hunted for their role in the execution (or "regicide") of Charles I of England, were hidden in the home of the town's minister, John Russell. During King Philip's War, an attack by Native Americans was, by some accounts, thwarted with the aid of General Goffe. This event, compounded by the reluctance of the townsfolk to betray Goffe's location, developed into the legend of the Angel of Hadley, which came to be included in the historical manuscript History of Hadley by Sylvester Judd.

In 1683, eleven years before the Salem witch trials, Mary Webster, wife to William Webster son of the former governor of Connecticut and a founder of the very town of Hadley (John Webster), was accused and acquitted of witchcraft. She was unsuccessfully hanged by rowdy town folk. A description is given in Cotton Mather's Magnalia Christi Americana.

The Civil War general Joseph Hooker was a longtime resident of Hadley. Levi Stockbridge, one of the founders of the Massachusetts Agricultural College (now the University of Massachusetts Amherst), was also from Hadley where he was a farmer.

=== Recent ===
Hadley's transformation from an old agricultural order to the new form is the direct result of expansion of the nearby University of Massachusetts Amherst during the 1960s. Much of its former farmland was swallowed in the housing market stimulated by incoming faculty and off-campus students. Route 116 was redirected in an attempt to solve traffic congestion. Route 9, which runs east–west through the town to connect Amherst and Northampton, became a hotpoint for commercial development due to Amherst not wanting development on its land while large corporations opened stores along the strip. Today, the Hadley economy is a mixture of agriculture and commercial development, including big-box stores and the Hampshire Mall.

In 2003, an organization called Hadley Neighbors for Sensible Development was formed that opposed continued large-scale commercial development in Hadley by emphasizing the downside of such growth. However, many local residents support commercial development, and about 1,000 people signed a petition asking for a new Wal-Mart, saying it would save them money on their groceries. In 2008, Wal-Mart pulled its plans to build the Supercenter after the Conservation Commission ruled that the plan did not comply with wetlands regulations. The developer of the site (Hampshire Mall) filed and lost numerous appeals but continued its legal challenges of the commission's findings. Many residents also opposed rezoning to accommodate a new Lowe's store because they said it would be too big and would require more filling of wetlands than allowed by state law. However, the rezoning passed in 2004 and the store was built in 2009. Lowe's then sued the town because it didn't want to pay the required sewer hookup fees. And, in 2010, the Massachusetts Department of Environmental Protection found that Lowe's had illegally filled large areas of wetlands on that site and fined the developer more than $15,000.

The World Monuments Fund listed the "Cultural Landscape of Hadley, Massachusetts" on the 2010 World Monuments Watch List of Most Endangered Sites.

Watch listing seeks to raise awareness about this rare survivor of 17th-century agriculture, promote visitation, and engage the local community in its stewardship.

— World Monuments Fund

The landscape of Hadley is largely open-field farming, which was only used in the earliest New England settlements and had mostly disappeared by the 18th century; its survival in Hadley on such a large scale is unusual. According to the World Monument Fund 165 acres (0.67 km^{2}) are zoned for residential and commercial use, providing no long-term protection for the historic landscape.

== Geography ==
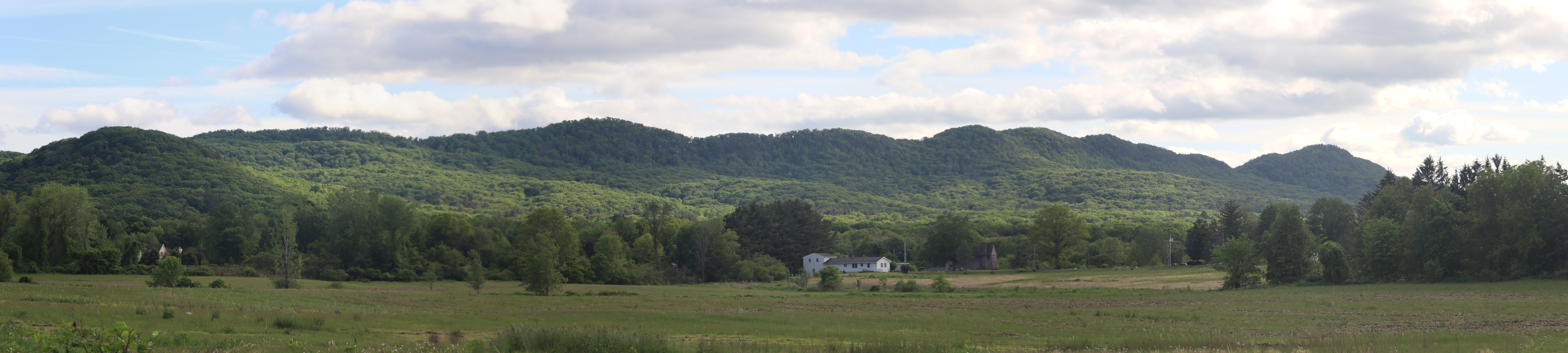
The Mount Holyoke Range is seen from Hadley in May, 2026.

According to the United States Census Bureau, the town has a total area of 24.6 square miles (63.7 km^{2}), of which 23.1 square miles (59.8 km^{2}) is land and 1.5 square miles (3.9 km^{2}), or 6.18%, is water. The land boundaries of Hadley are Sunderland to the north, Amherst to the east, and South Hadley to the south. Across the Connecticut River, Hadley borders Hatfield to the northwest, Northampton to the west, and Easthampton and Holyoke along a short length of river to the southwest. The Mount Holyoke Range forms the boundary with South Hadley and is where the highest point of Hadley is found. This is on Mount Hitchcock at an elevation of 990 to 1,000 feet (300 to 300 m). The Metacomet-Monadnock Trail traverses the Holyoke Range with panoramic vistas from several locations.

== Demographics ==
Historical population
Year	Pop.	±%
1790	882	—
1850	1,986	+125.2%
1860	2,105	+6.0%
1870	2,301	+9.3%
1880	1,938	−15.8%
1890	1,669	−13.9%
1900	1,789	+7.2%
1910	1,999	+11.7%
1920	2,784	+39.3%
1930	2,082	−25.2%
1940	2,576	+23.7%
1950	2,639	+2.4%
1960	3,099	+17.4%
1970	3,750	+21.0%
1980	4,125	+10.0%
1990	4,231	+2.6%
2000	4,793	+13.3%
2010	5,250	+9.5%
2020	5,325	+1.4%
2022*	5,270	−1.0%
* = population estimate.

As of the census of 2000, there were 4,793 people, 1,895 households, and 1,248 families residing in the town. The population density was 205.7 inhabitants per square mile (79.4/km^{2}). There were 1,953 housing units at an average density of 83.8 per square mile (32.4/km^{2}). The racial makeup of the town was 95.91% White, 0.75% African American, 0.6% Native American, 1.56% Asian, 0.58% from other races, and 1.13% from two or more races. Hispanic or Latino of any race were 1.67% of the population.

There were 1,895 households, out of which 26.6% had children under the age of 18 living with them, 53.1% were married couples living together, 9.8% had a female householder with no husband present, and 34.1% were non-families. Of all households, 24.7% were made up of individuals, and 12.2% had someone living alone who was 65 years of age or older. The average household size was 2.45 and the average family size was 2.90.

The population was spread out, with 20.0% under the age of 18, 7.0% from 18 to 24, 27.7% from 25 to 44, 25.7% from 45 to 64, and 19.5% who were 65 years of age or older. The median age was 42 years. For every 100 females, there were 88.5 males. For every 100 females age 18 and over, there were 87.4 males.

The median income for a household in the town was $51,851, and the median income for a family was $61,897. Males had a median income of $44,773 versus $34,189 for females. The per capita income for the town was $24,945. About 4.8% of families and 6.9% of the population were below the poverty line, including 6.6% of those under age 18 and 3.2% of those age 65 or over.

== Education ==
Hadley is home to Hadley Elementary School serving children in kindergarten through sixth grade, and Hopkins Academy, serving grades seven through twelve. Hopkins Academy was founded in 1664 through money that was donated by Edward Hopkins, a wealthy Connecticut merchant, and it is the fourth oldest public high school in the United States. Hadley is also home to the Pioneer Valley Chinese Immersion Charter School.

University of Massachusetts Amherst is partly in Hadley.

== Government ==
Hadley is governed by open Town Meeting, a Select Board, and a Town Administrator.

=== Select Board ===
- Randall Izer, Chair – Term Expires 2028
- David J. Fill II, Clerk – Term Expires 2027
- Molly Keegan, Member – Term Expires 2028
- Jane Nevinsmith, Member – Term Expires 2026
- Amy Parsons, Member – Term Expires 2027

=== Town Administrator ===
- Michael Mason (Police Chief/Acting Town Administrator) September 2024 – present
- Carolyn Brennan 2019 – September 2024
- David Nixon 2005-2020

== Economy ==
Hadley's economy can be in large part characterized by agriculture and retail services, having the thoroughfare Massachusetts Route 9 traversing it east to west with abundant stores, and a wide variety of farms which benefit from the area's Hadley loam. Due to its climate and soils, one of its staple crops for the last two centuries has consistently been its asparagus, which has been described as competing in Boston markets despite local availability of the crop from other nearby regions, as well as in restaurants in France and Germany, and Queen Elizabeth II's own annual spring feast in England. Its ubiquity and reputation in Hadley agriculture has lent it the nickname "Hadley grass".

== Points of interest ==
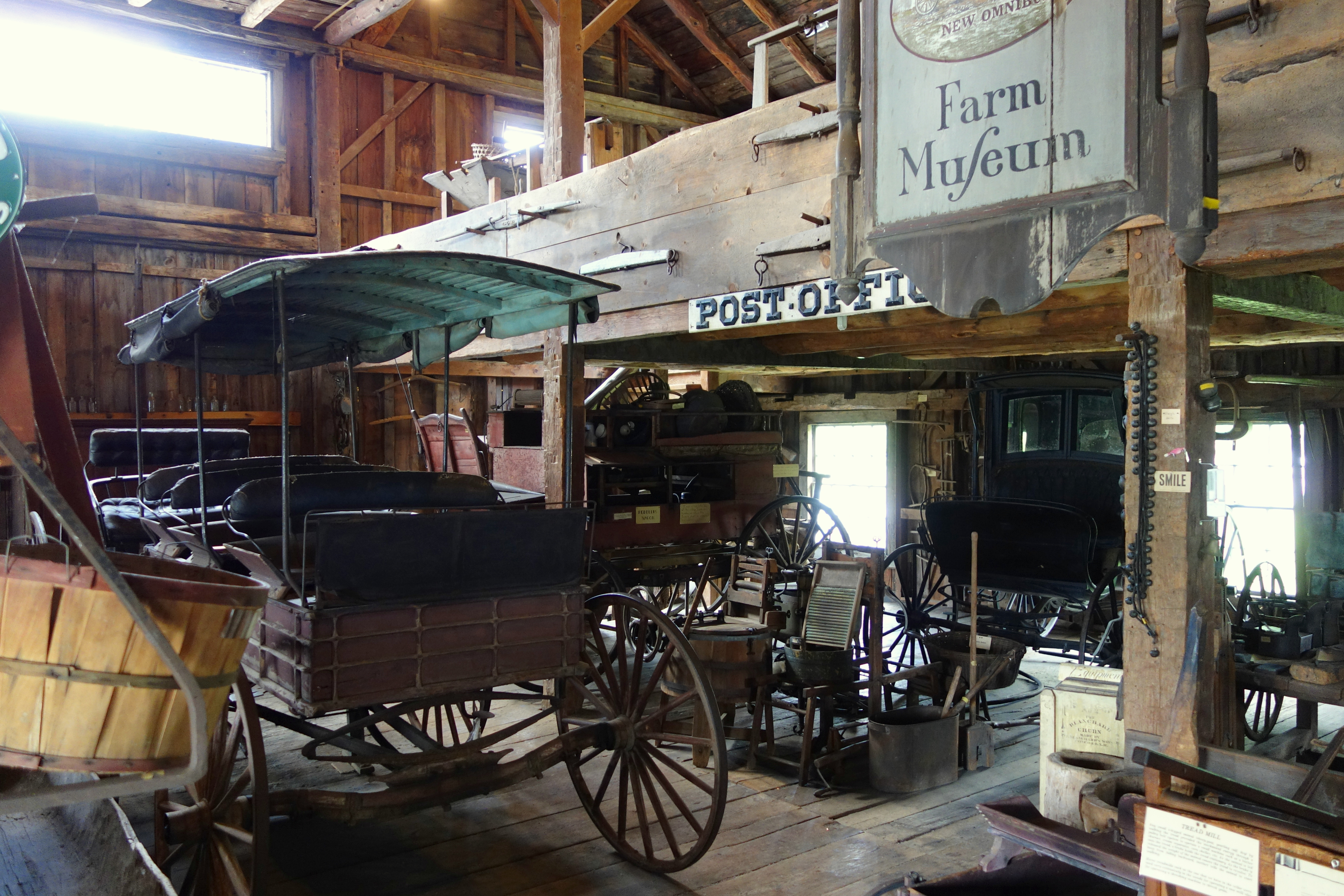
Historical coaches and farming implements in the Hadley Farm Museum

- Porter-Phelps-Huntington Museum
- Skinner State Park and Historic Summit House
- Hopkins Academy (fourth oldest school in the United States; currently Hadley's public middle and high school)
- Hadley Farm Museum
- Hadley Town Common
- Regicides monument commemorating the site where Rev. John Russell sheltered Edward Whalley and William Goffe in his home
- Warren McGuirk Alumni Stadium, the University of Massachusetts Amherst football stadium
- Norwottuck Branch of the Mass Central Rail Trail (shared use path which can be traveled from Northampton, MA to Belchertown, MA; the path runs through Hadley)
- Connecticut River (the longest river in New England)
- Silvio O. Conte National Fish and Wildlife Refuge (the only refuge of its kind to encompass an entire watershed). The Fort River Birding and Nature Trail, Fort River Division in Hadley, MA features a storybook trail along a 1.1 mile fully accessible loop that can be enjoyed by walkers, parents with strollers or people who use wheelchairs.

== Notable people ==
- Hope Atherton, Reverend
- William Goffe, English parliamentarian and regicide
- Lisa Green, Distinguished University Professor of Linguistics at the University of Massachusetts Amherst
- Thomas Hannum, band director at UMass Amherst with the Minuteman Marching Band. Percussion instructor and director with Boston Crusaders Drum and Bugle Corps. Member of the Drum Corps International Hall of Fame.
- Sara Northrup Hollister, occultist
- Joseph Hooker, Civil War general
- Clifton Johnson, American writer, illustrator and photographer
- Elizabeth Porter Phelps, early American diarist
- Levi Stockbridge, Farmer and Scientist. Helped found Massachusetts Agricultural College (now known as the University of Massachusetts Amherst) and served as first Professor of Agricultural at the school. Also served as Farm Superintendent and President
- John Webster, governor of the Colony of Connecticut (1656–1657)
- Mary Webster, accused of witchcraft, later survived an attempted lynching
- Edward Whalley, English parliamentarian and regicide

== See also ==
- Tofu Curtain
