= The Wept of Wish-ton-Wish =

1829 novel by James Fenimore Cooper

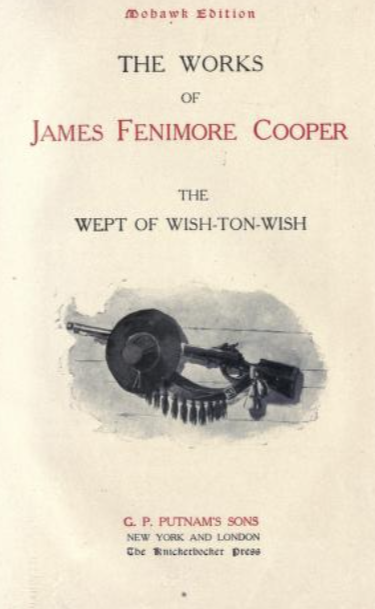
- Author: James Fenimore Cooper
- Original title: The Wept of Wish-ton-Wish: A Tale
- Language: English
- Subject: King Philip's War
- Genre: Historical fiction
- Published: 1829 (UK), 1829 (US)
- Publisher: Carey, Lea & Carey

The Wept of Wish-ton-Wish: A Tale is an 1829 historical novel written by American writer James Fenimore Cooper. It was Cooper's ninth novel.

== Background ==
James Fenimore Cooper's The Wept of Wish-ton-Wish: A Tale is a historical novel set during King Philip's War, and was first published on November 6, 1829.

With the success of his novel The Red Rover, a London publisher proposed a total of $600 for each of two tales, one an American tale and the other a sea story (The Water Witch). Cooper's work began during his time in Switzerland in 1828. In May 1828, Cooper informed Charles Wilkes that he anticipated printing again, and by August, he had a book that was half completed. The novel was eventually completed in Florence, Italy.

Published first in London, the first American edition of Cooper's novel was published by Carey, Lea & Carey in Philadelphia during the same year. The American rights to the novel were sold for $3,000, payable in four installments from February through May 1830.

The title puzzled the public and did not satisfy them so it was only used in the United States. In England, it was called The Borderers; or, the Wept of Wish-ton-Wish, and in France, it went by The Puritans of America, or the Valley of Wish-ton-Wish. It has also appeared with the title The Heathcotes.

Shortly after its release, the work was adapted for theater in both the United States and England.

The 1830 The Water Witch succeeded the novel.

== Plot ==
Captain Mark Heathcote, a devout Puritan and former militiaman, leaves colonial Massachusetts to establish a settlement in the Connecticut wilderness, where he and his family face frequent conflict with Native Americans, including the captured Narragansett youth Conanchet. Years later, during the violent King Philip's War, Heathcote's granddaughter Ruth reappears as the Indian chief's wife and mother of his child.
