= Goffe and Whalley =

Two men involved in the regicide of King Charles I

The phrase "Goffe and Whalley" or "Whalley and Goffe" refers to two men who fled in 1660 to Massachusetts Bay Colony and ultimately New Haven after their involvement in the 1649 regicide of King Charles I of England:

- William Goffe, an English Roundhead politician and soldier
- Edward Whalley, an English military leader during the English Civil War

The phrase is occasionally used as metonym or synecdoche for the tribunal of men (also called regicides) who ordered the king's execution.

Another regicide of Charles I who fled separately to New Haven Colony, John Dixwell, is sometimes included in the phrase (as in "Goffe, Whalley, and Dixwell").

== See also ==
- Charles I of England
- Regicide of Charles I of England
- List of regicides of Charles I
- High Court of Justice for the trial of Charles I
- English Civil War
- English Restoration
- Indemnity and Oblivion Act
