= John Langley (MP) =

English merchant and politician

John Langley was an English merchant and politician who sat in the House of Commons in 1653.

Langley was a merchant of the City of London and a member of the Worshipful Company of Fishmongers. He was one of the Court Assistants from 1643 to 1648 and from 1649 to 1650. He was elected alderman of the City of London for Langbourn ward in December 1649 or January 1650. From 1650 to 1652 he was on the Committee of the East India Company. In 1652 he was Commissioner for the Admiralty and Navy and also Prime Warden of the Fishmongers Company.

In 1653, Langley was nominated as Member of Parliament for City of London in the Barebones Parliament. He was a member of the Committee of the East India Company from 1653 to 1655 and from 1656 to 1657. He was one of the Court Assistants from 1664 to 1671. He was Deputy-Governor of the Levant Company from 1671 to 1672 and was again one of the Court Assistants from 1672 to 1673.

Langley became poor in his old age and a pension of £20 per annum was granted to him by the Court of Common Council on 10 October 1679.

Langley married a daughter of Richard Middleton (Alderman 1649), and his daughter married Sir Hans Sloane.

Parliament of England
Preceded by Isaac Penington	Member of Parliament for City of London; 1653; With: Robert Tichborne; John Ireton; Samuel Moyer; John Stone; Henry Barton; Praise-God Barebone	Succeeded by Thomas Adams; Thomas Foote; William Steele; John Langham; Samuel Avery; Andrew Riccard
