= John Stone (Parliamentarian) =

English politician

John Stone was an English politician who sat in the House of Commons between 1653 and 1659.

Stone was from Ridgmont, Bedfordshire and lived at Friday Street, London. In 1632 he purchased the manor of Chalford in Aston Rowant in Oxfordshire.

In 1653, Stone was elected Member of Parliament for City of London in the Barebones Parliament. He was a trustee for the Lord Mayor and commonalty of London in 1653. In 1654 he was elected MP for Cirencester in the First Protectorate Parliament. He was one of the three Tellers of the Exchequer in 1654. In 1655 he was a member of the Trade Committee and the Trade and Navigation Committee, an auditor of all treasurers and receivers of state money, an excise commissioner and agent for wine licences. He was re-elected MP for Cirencester in 1656 for the Second Protectorate Parliament and became a commissioner for securing the peace in the City of London in the same year. In 1659 he was re-elected MP for Cirencester for the Third Protectorate Parliament.

Stone had a son Richard who died in 1661 and was the father of John Stone MP for Wallingford.

Parliament of England
Preceded by Sir Thomas Soame; Isaac Penington; Samuel Vassall; John Venn	Member of Parliament for City of London; 1653; With: Robert Tichborne; John Ireton; Samuel Moyer; John Langley; Henry Barton; Praise-God Barebone	Succeeded by Thomas Foote; William Steele; Thomas Adams; John Langham; Samuel Avery; Andrew Riccard
Preceded by Not represented in Barebones Parliament	Member of Parliament for Cirencester; 1654–1659; With: Richard Southby 1659	Succeeded by Nathaniel Rich
