= Sir Richard Browne, 1st Baronet, of London =

English merchant, general and MP

Sir Richard Browne
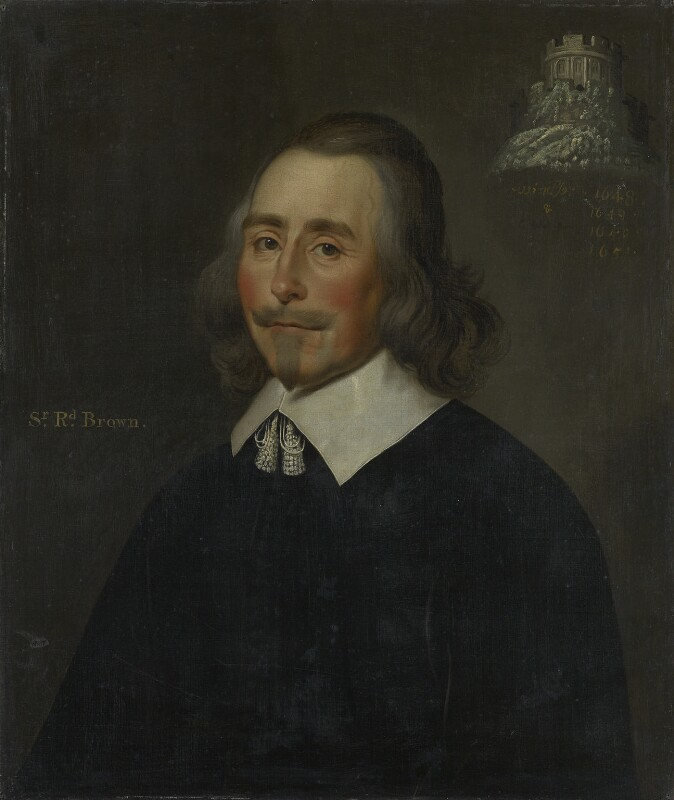

Member of Parliament for Ludgershall
- In office December 1661 – September 1669

Lord Mayor of London
- In office October 1660 – September 1661

Member of Parliament for City of London
- In office September 1654 – December 1660

Member of Parliament for Wycombe
- In office September 1645 – December 1648 (excluded by Pride's Purge)

Parliamentarian Governor of Abingdon
- In office June 1644 – 1646

Personal details
- Born: c. 1602 London
- Died: 24 September 1669 Debden Hall, Uttlesford
- Resting place: Church of St Mary the Virgin and All Saints, Debden, Epping Forest
- Spouse: Bridget Bryan 1631 to his death
- Children: 5, including Richard

Military service
- Rank: Major General
- Battles/wars: Wars of the Three Kingdoms; Skirmish at Tonbridge; Cheriton; Siege of Faringdon House; Siege of Oxford; Booth's Uprising

Sir Richard Browne (c. 1602 – 24 September 1669) was a merchant and MP from London who became a Major general in the Parliamentarian army during the Wars of the Three Kingdoms. A moderate Presbyterian, after victory in the First English Civil War Browne supported a negotiated settlement in which Charles I retained his throne. As a result, he fell out with radicals such as Oliver Cromwell, and was excluded from Parliament by Pride's Purge in December 1648.

He opposed The Protectorate, spending nearly five years in prison, and was suspected of involvement in the Royalist Booth's Uprising. After the Stuart Restoration in 1660, he became Lord Mayor of London and MP for Ludgershall.

== Early life ==
Browne was born in London around 1602, to John Browne (alias Moses) of Wokingham in Berkshire and his wife, Anne Beard. He was a member of the Worshipful Company of Woodmongers by 1634, and became sufficiently wealthy by trading in coal and timber to invest £600 in the scheme for reconquest of Ireland under the Adventurers' Act. Royalist propagandists sneered at Browne's lowly origins by referring to him as 'the woodmonger'; he transferred to the more socially respectable Merchant Taylors' Company in 1656.

== Military career ==
Key locations mentioned in article

Browne was admitted as a member of the Honourable Artillery Company in 1622 and was an officer in the part-time London Trained Bands (LTBs). When the LTBs were expanded in April 1642, Browne was 1st Captain of the Orange Regiment. By mid-September, after the Civil War had broken out, he was organising a regiment of dragoons recruited in London, of which he became Colonel. He helped to disarm Royalists in Kent and then served under Sir William Waller at the seizure of Winchester in December. Browne's Dragoons were in action at Brill in January 1643.

In July 1643, Browne was given an independent command, leading Mainwaring's Redcoats and the Green Auxiliaries of the LTBs with detachments of horse and dragoons to break up an assembly of Royalists at Sevenoaks in Kent. The Royalists retreated to Tonbridge where there was a three-hour skirmish on 24 July, when they were driven out of town and 200 were captured. It had become the practice for regiments drawn from the LTBs to serve for short periods with the Parliamentarian field armies. In December 1643 Parliament appointed Browne Sergeant-Major-General to command a City brigade consisting of the White and Yellow Regiments to reinforce Waller's army besieging Arundel Castle. The two regiments marched out on 4 and 5 January 1644 with a number of cannon, but heavy snow delayed their march for several days at Guildford, and they did not reach Petworth until 29 January, after Arundel had fallen. Here Browne fortified Petworth House in case Lord Hopton's Royalist army threatened. The brigade remained there for two months before moving to Midhurst on 20 March and then joining Waller's army on 27 March. Waller and Hopton manoeuvred and skirmished for two days, with Waller's army camped in the fields at Cheriton. Then on 29 March Waller sent skirmishers including some of Browne's men into Cheriton Wood on Hopton's left. Hopton drove them out, but his horse attacked without orders, precipitating a general engagement (the Battle of Cheriton). A cavalry battle took place in the space between the wings of foot, the London brigade having to drive back several Royalist probes in their direction. The Royalist cavalry lost heavily, and in the afternoon Browne led the foot back into Cheriton Wood as Hopton's army began to retreat. On 6 April Browne's City Brigade was engaged at Bishop's Waltham, where they forced the surrender of the fortified Bishop's Palace. The Londoners were now anxious to return home, and the two regiments left without orders, returning to the city as heroes on 14 April. Without the City Brigade Waller had to shut down operations.

In June 1644 Parliament gave Browne a commission as Major-General for the counties of Oxfordshire, Buckinghamshire and Berkshire with the task of reducing the Royalist garrisons, and assigned him a brigade consisting of the Red, White and Blue Auxiliaries of the LTBs, all understrength. It was learnt that the King's army from Oxford was moving eastwards and threatening the Parliamentarian Eastern Association, so Browne was directed into Hertfordshire to protect these counties. He was joined by the Essex and Hertfordshire Trained Bands. By the time his force assembled at Barnet, he was too late to help Waller, who was defeated by the Royalists at the Battle of Cropredy Bridge on 29 June. When he joined Waller at Towcester on 2 July, Waller's dispirited London brigade assumed that Browne's had been sent to relieve them, and they set up a chant of 'Home, Home!' The Essex and Hertfordshire men were also deserting, and on 6 July they wounded Browne in the face when he confronted them.

The Royalist army having disengaged and moved west, Browne was sent to capture Greenland House near Henley-on-Thames, under his original orders, and then moved to Reading. Ordered to join Waller at Abingdon-on-Thames, he objected that he had only 'three broken regiments of London auxiliaries, not above 800 in all' to hold Reading. In fact, he had fallen out with Waller and threatened to resign if forced to accept the latter's orders. In the end Waller left for London and Browne was put in command of the whole force at Abingdon, marching in with his brigade on 15 August. He and his troops were not involved in the Second Battle of Newbury in October, but as Governor of Abingdon, Browne kept up active skirmishing against the Royalist stronghold of Oxford during the winter. In the summer of 1645 he participated in the Second Siege of Oxford, and in September had to put down a serious clash between the garrison of Aylesbury and other Parliamentarian troops. He was again active in the final Third Siege of Oxford in 1646 and continued as Governor of Abingdon until the end of the First Civil War later that year.

== Political career ==
Browne had been elected 'Recruiter' (replacement) Member of Parliament for the Buckinghamshire seat of Chipping Wycombe in October 1645, but had received a leave of absence so that he could continue his command (otherwise banned under the Self-denying Ordinance). In January 1647 he was one of the parliamentary commissioners to receive King Charles upon his handover by the Scots. He was with Charles at Holdenby House when the king was seized for the Army by Cornet George Joyce in July that year, an act that Browne vociferously opposed. He became an alderman of the City of London for Langbourn Ward on 29 June 1648 and was Sheriff of the City of London to 11 December 1649. As an opponent of the Army's policies, he was excluded from Parliament under Pride's Purge in December 1648, and was imprisoned for five years after being accused of conspiracy with the Scots.

Browne was elected MP for City of London in 1656 for the Second Protectorate Parliament, but remained excluded. He was admitted to the Worshipful Company of Merchant Taylors on 10 December 1656. He was re-elected MP for the City of London in 1659 for the Third Protectorate Parliament and did take his seat until he was implicated in Booth's Uprising and forced into hiding in the city. He had become disillusioned with The Protectorate and was one of those who called for the return of the monarchy. In April 1660 he was elected MP for the City of London for the Convention Parliament. He met Charles II at the head of his triumphal procession into London. Browne gave evidence against Adrian Scrope that led to the latter's execution as a regicide.

Browne was knighted in March 1660 and created a baronet on 22 July 1660. He became alderman for Langbourn Ward again in 1660 and was elected Lord Mayor of London in 1660. He was instrumental in putting down Venner's Rising of 1–4 January 1661, personally leading the Yellow Regiment of the LTBs against the insurgents. In 1661 he was elected MP for Ludgershall in the Cavalier Parliament and sat until his death in 1669.

Browne lived at Debden Manor, near Saffron Walden, in Essex which he had purchased before May 1662. He died intestate at Debden on 24 September 1669. He had children: Sir Richard Browne and Sir John Browne.

== Sources ==
- John Adair, Cheriton 1644: The Campaign and the Battle, Kineton: Roundwood, 1973, ISBN 0-900093-19-6.
- Ian F.W. Beckett, Wanton Troopers: Buckinghamshire in the Civil Wars 1640–1660, Barnsley:Pen & Sword, 2015, ISBN 978-1-47385-603-5.
- Lt-Col Alfred H. Burne & Lt-Col Peter Young, The Great Civil War: A Military History of the First Civil War 1642–1646, London: Eyre & Spottiswoode, 1959/Moreton-in-Marsh, Windrush Press, 1998, ISBN 1-900624-22-2.
- The Complete Baronetage, ca 1900, reprinted 1983.
- Dictionary of National Biography, 1886.
- Lawson Chase Nagel, The Militia of London, 1641–1649, PhD thesis, King's College London, 1982.
- Lindley, Keith (2004). "Browne, Sir Richard, first baronet (c. 1602–1669)". Oxford Dictionary of National Biography (online ed.). Oxford University Press. doi:10.1093/ref:odnb/3692. (Subscription, Wikipedia Library access or UK public library membership required.)
- Keith Roberts, London And Liberty: Ensigns of the London Trained Bands, Eastwood, Nottinghamshire: Partizan Press, 1987, ISBN 0-946525-16-1.
- Margaret Toynbee & Brig Peter Young, Cropredy Bridge, 1644: The Campaign and the Battle, Kineton: Roundwood, 1970, ISBN 0-900093-17-X.

=== External links ===
- British Civil War Project
- History of Parliament Online
- Royal Berkshire History: Sir Richard Browne
- thePeerage.com

Parliament of England
Preceded by Thomas Adams; Thomas Foote; William Steele; John Langham; Samuel Avery; Andrew Riccard	Member of Parliament for City of London; 1656–1659; With: Theophilus Biddulph; John Jones 1656–1659; Thomas Adams 1656; Thomas Foote 1656; Sir Christopher Pack 1656; William Thompson 1659	Succeeded by Isaac Penington
Preceded by Isaac Penington	Member of Parliament for the City of London; 1660–1661; With: William Wilde; William Vincent; John Robinson	Succeeded by John Fowke; Sir William Thompson; William Love; John Jones
Preceded by Thomas Allen	Lord Mayor of London; 1660–1661	Succeeded by John Frederick
Baronetage of England
New creation	Baronet (of London); 1660–1669	Succeeded by Richard Browne
