= Samuel Avery =

English politician (died 1664)

Samuel Avery (died 1664) was an English politician who sat in the House of Commons in 1654.

Avery was a merchant of the City of London and a member of the Worshipful Company of Merchant Taylors. In 1645 he was elected alderman of the City of London for Cripplegate ward. He was Master of the Merchant Taylors Company for 1645 to 1646 and was Commissioner for Customs from 1645 to 1649. On 16 September 1647 he became alderman instead for Bassishaw ward and remained until 1653. He was Sheriff of London for the year 1647 to 1648.

In 1654, Avery was elected member of parliament for City of London in the First Protectorate Parliament.

Samuel Hartlib's papers contain a letter, allegedly to Samuel Avery from his brother Joseph, dated 16 June 1642. In it, Joseph indicates he is living in Germany, conducting secret negotiations for King Charles I. In response to a request from Samuel, he provides intelligence on the preparedness and intentions of Denmark's navy.

Parliament of England
Preceded by Robert Tichborne; John Ireton; Samuel Moyer; John Langley; John Stone; Henry Barton; Praise-God Barebone	Member of Parliament for City of London; 1654; With: Thomas Adams; Thomas Foote; William Steele; John Langham; Andrew Riccard	Succeeded by Thomas Adams; Theophilus Biddulph; Richard Browne; Thomas Foote; Sir Christopher Pack; John Jones
