= William Vincent (MP) =

Member of the Parliament of England

Sir William Vincent (c. 1615 – 1661) was an English merchant and politician, who sat in the House of Commons in 1660. He acted for the City of London during the Restoration.

Vincent was the son of Francis Vincent, chapman of Weedon, Northamptonshire, and his wife, Elizabeth Langham, daughter of Edward Langham of Guilsborough, Northamptonshire, and sister of Sir John Langham, 1st Baronet. Vincent was apprenticed to Thomas Langham, a Grocer of London, and established himself as a linen-draper. He became a member of the Worshipful Company of Grocers in about 1639 and a member of the Honourable Artillery Company in 1640. In 1645 he became an assistant of the Levant Company; he became husband of the company in 1650. He was a member of the committee of the East India Company from 1654 until his death. He was commissioner for assessment for London in 1657 and a common councilman in 1657 and 1658. In 1658, he was elected an alderman of the City of London, for Bishopsgate ward. He was elected Sheriff of London in 1659, but did not serve.

In 1659, Vincent was commissioner for militia and became deputy governor of the Levant Company, a position he held until his death. He signed the petition for a free Parliament and presented it to the Rump Parliament. He was commissioner for assessment for London from January 1660 until his death and was one of the three commissioners empowered to deal with Duke General Monck on behalf of the city. He was imprisoned in the Tower of London when the Council of State ordered his arrest for suspected high treason on 6 February 1660, and was released when the secluded Members were returned to parliament. He was commissioner for militia in March 1660.

In April 1660, Vincent was elected Member of Parliament for the City of London. He was one of the four London merchants who advanced £25,000 for the King in Holland. After presenting the reply of the City of London to the Declaration of Breda, he was knighted, in May 1660. He was appointed treasurer of poll-tax in September 1660. In 1661, he was common councilman again, warden of the Grocers' Company, and vice president of the Honourable Artillery Company. He was also colonel in the blue regiment of militia of foot from March 1661 and was warden elect of the Grocers Company.

Vincent died before September 1661, at the age of about 46.

Vincent married first, by licence dated 7 June 1644, Rebecca Ferres, daughter of Thomas Ferrers, merchant of London. His second wife was Rebecca Chambers, daughter of Richard Chambers, Girdler of London. He had two sons and four daughters.

Parliament of England
Preceded by Isaac Penington	Member of Parliament for the City of London; 1660–1661; With: William Wilde; Richard Browne; John Robinson	Succeeded by John Fowke; Sir William Thompson; William Love; John Jones
