= Sir Theophilus Biddulph, 1st Baronet =

English politician

Sir Theophilus Biddulph, 1st Baronet (1612 – 25 March 1683) was the son of Michael Biddulph of Elmhurst, Staffordshire.

He was a London Silkman who was knighted in 1660 and created a baronet in the Baronetage of England on 2 November 1664. His residence was Westcombe Manor, Greenwich, Kent.

He was Member of Parliament for London 1656–1659 and for Lichfield, Staffordshire 1661–1679.

He is mentioned in the diary of Samuel Pepys for 1664–5.

He died at Greenwich aged 72, and was buried on 14 April 1683 at Stow Church, Lichfield. He was succeeded by his son Michael, and his brother Michael was also MP for Lichfield.

== Notes ==
Parliament of England
Preceded by Thomas Adams; Thomas Foote; William Steele; John Langham; Samuel Avery; Andrew Riccard	Member of Parliament for London; 1656–1659; With: Richard Browne 1656–1659; John Jones 1656–1659; Thomas Adams 1656; Thomas Foote 1656; Sir Christopher Pack 1656; William Thompson 1659	Succeeded by Isaac Pennington
Preceded by Michael Biddulph; Thomas Minors	Member of Parliament for Lichfield; 1661–1679; With: John Lane 1661–1667; Richard Dyott 1667–1677; Sir Henry Lyttelton, 2nd Baronet 1678–1679	Succeeded by Sir Henry Lyttelton, 2nd Baronet; Sir Michael Biddulph, 2nd Baronet
Baronetage of England
New title	Baronet (of Westcombe); 1664–1683	Succeeded by Michael Biddulph
