= Andrew Riccard =

English merchant and politician

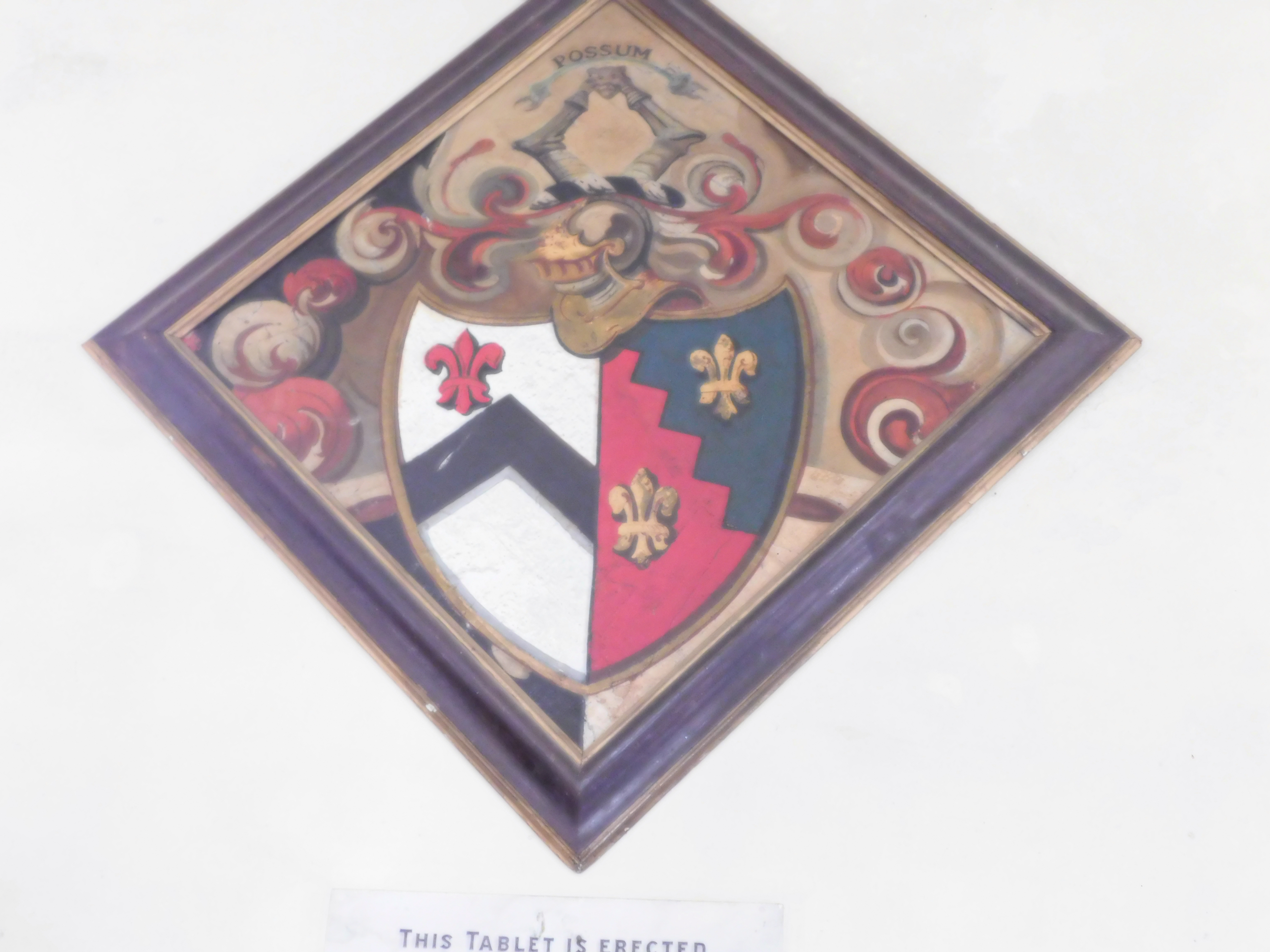
Riccard hatchment in Portesham

Sir Andrew Riccard (c. 1604 – 6 September 1672) was an English merchant and politician who sat in the House of Commons in 1654.

== Background & family ==
Riccard was born in Portesham, the son of Walter Riccard. He married firstly Catherine, daughter of a leading East India merchant and MP. Their only surviving daughter Christiana married successively Lord Kensington, son of the second Earl of Holland, and John Berkeley, 1st Baron Berkeley of Stratton, by whom she was ancestress of the succeeding Lords. He married, secondly, Susanna Bateman who survived him and was buried 17 Mar 1686 at St Olave’s.

== Portesham ==
In 1634 Riccard was rich enough to pay for a coat of arms, which included, as a crest referring to his eastern trade, a ‘Saracen’s head’ wearing a turban.

He is said to have used the motto ‘Possum’ (Latin ‘I am able’) which was also the common name of the village of his birth. He purchased the manor of Portesham, which (on his death) passed to his daughter and her second husband.

Riccard granted freeholds to many of his Portesham tenants — a generous gesture which would have given the villagers independence and a stake of their own in the village. He seems to have been known for his generosity, reflected in the words of his epitaph. His hatchment is in St Peter's Church, Portesham, on the north wall of the north aisle, and his father’s grave slab is on the floor by the font.

== The English Civil War ==
Riccard was a Royalist sympathiser, and joined with other leading merchants to sign petitions against some of the measures being taken by Parliament. But he seems to have avoided getting too involved in politics, concentrating on his business interests.

== Offices held ==
Riccard became a shipowner, even hiring out vessels to the Venetians (the chief traders in the eastern Mediterranean). In 1646 he was elected to the committee of the East India Company, and four years later became treasurer of the Levant Company. He was made Alderman of the City of London and was Sheriff of London in 1651. In 1653, he was master of the Drapers’ Company. In 1654, he became Governor of the Levant Company, a post he held for 18 years. He was at various times Governor of the East India Company and of the Turkey Company. In 1654 he was elected Member of Parliament for City of London in the First Protectorate Parliament. Following the Restoration, he was knighted by Charles II on 10 July 1660.

== Arrest ==
In 1668 he had some trouble during a dispute which was referred to the House of Lords, and was threatened with being sent to the Tower. He managed to avoid that fate, but was kept in custody for some days.

== Death ==
Riccard died at around the age of 68 and a monument including a full size statue was erected at the church of St Olave’s after his death by members of the Turkey Company. The inscription reads as follows.

"Sacred be the statue here raised by gratitude and respect to eternize the memory of Sir Andrew Riccard, knight, a citizen, and opulent merchant of London; whose active piety, inflexible integrity, and extensive abilities, alike distinguished and exalted him in the opinion of the wise and good. Adverse to his wish, he was frequently chosen chairman of the Honourable East India Company, and filled, with equal credit, for eighteen successive years, the same eminent station in the Turkey Company. Among many instances of his love to God and liberal spirit towards man, one, as it demands peculiar praise, deserves to be distinctly recorded. He nobly left the perpetual advowson of this parish in trust to five of its senior inhabitants. He died 6th Sept., in the year of our Lord, 1672, of his age, 68. "Manet post funera virtus."

Parliament of England
Preceded by Robert Tichborne; John Ireton; Samuel Moyer; John Langley; John Stone; Henry Barton; Praise-God Barebone	Member of Parliament for City of London; 1654; With: Thomas Adams; Thomas Foote; William Steele; John Langham; Samuel Avery	Succeeded by Thomas Adams; Theophilus Biddulph; Richard Browne; Thomas Foote; Sir Christopher Pack; John Jones
