= Samuel Moyer =

English merchant and politician

Samuel Moyer (c. 1609–1683) was an English merchant and politician who sat in the House of Commons in 1653. He was a strong republican and supporter of the Parliamentary cause in the English Civil War.

== Biography ==
Moyer was a merchant in the City of London and a member of the Worshipful Company of Mercers. He was a strong supporter of parliament and the Commonwealth. In 1652 he was a member of Hale Commission which made a fundamental examination of the law and introduced many aspects of the criminal justice system.

Moyer was one of a number of radical puritans who had a house in Clapham Surrey, in his case from 1652 to 1662. A number of his associates such as Richard Salwey and William Kiffin were there at the same time.

In 1653, Moyer became an Alderman of the City of London for Cheap ward and was then nominated as Member of Parliament for City of London in the Barebones Parliament. In the same year he was Master of the Mercer's Company. He was acting president of the Council of State from 4 October 1653 to 3 November 1653. He was by 1659 chairman of the London Committee for Compounding. On 15 February 1659, he presented a petition to the House of Commons on behalf of the Commonwealth.

In 1661 Moyer was arrested and charged with treason alongside James Harrington and Praise-God Barebone. He was then imprisoned in the Tower of London until his brother Laurence secured his release in 1667.

== Family ==
Moyer was the father of Samuel Moyer who was also a merchant and was created a baronet in 1701 (see Moyer Baronets).

Parliament of England
Preceded by Isaac Penington	Member of Parliament for City of London; 1653; With: Robert Tichborne; John Ireton; John Langley; John Stone; Henry Barton; Praise-God Barebone	Succeeded by Thomas Adams; Thomas Foote; William Steele; John Langham; Samuel Avery; Andrew Riccard
