= Sir John Langham, 1st Baronet =

English politician

Sir John Langham, 1st Baronet (20 April 1584 – 16 May 1671) was an English politician who sat in the House of Commons in 1654 and 1660.

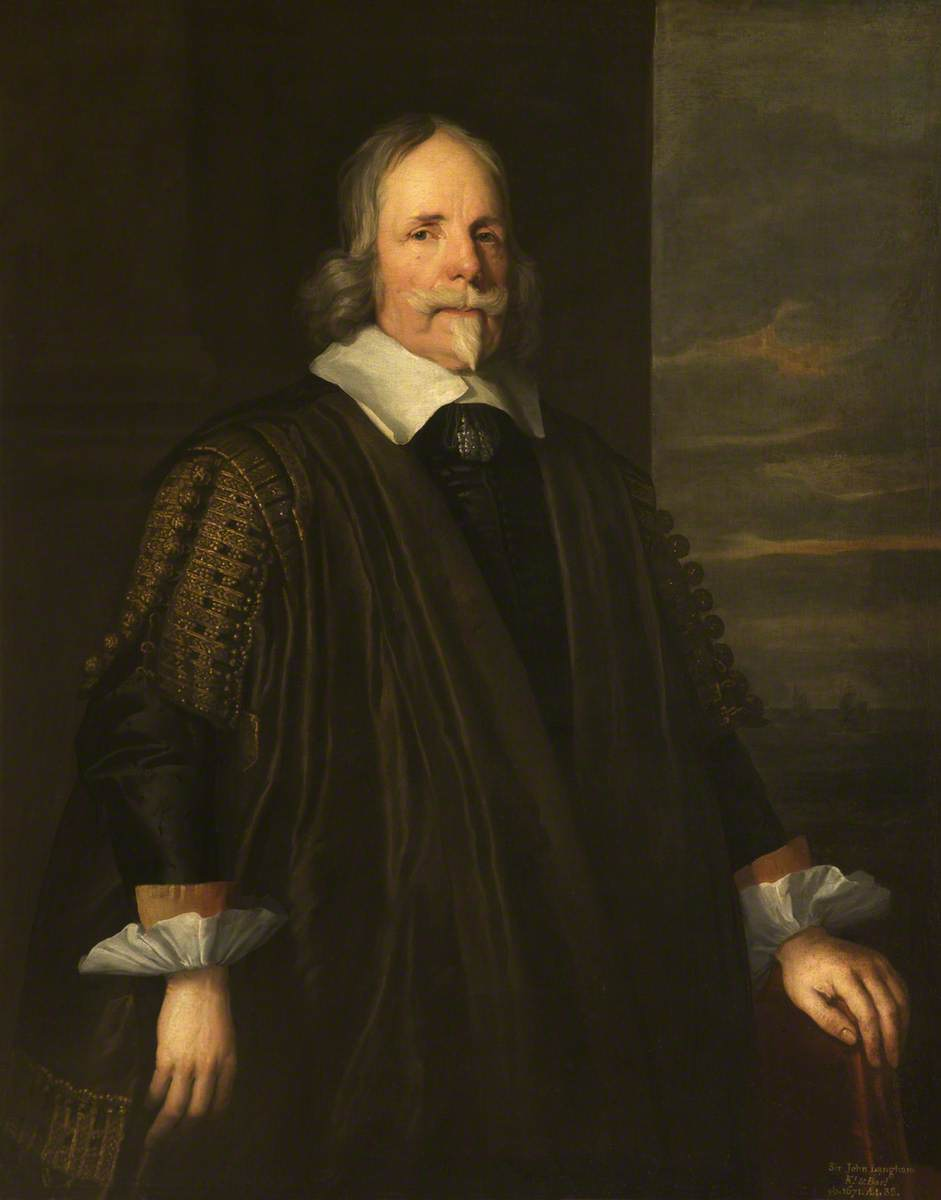
Sir John Langham

He was the eldest son of Edward Langham of Guilsborough, Northamptonshire, who he succeeded in 1607. He was apprenticed to Sir Richard Napier, a Turkey merchant, for whom he worked in the Near East.

On his return he became a Turkey merchant himself, made a considerable fortune in the City of London and became a prominent member of the Levant and East India Companies. He built up an estate in Northamptonshire which included the purchase of the Cottesbrooke estate in 1635. He was an alderman and Sheriff of London in 1643. He was committed to the Tower of London twice, with the Lord Mayor and other aldermen of London for refusing to publish an act for the abolition of royalty.

In 1654 he was elected Member of Parliament for the City of London for the First Protectorate Parliament. In 1660, he was elected Member of Parliament for Southwark in the Convention Parliament. He was knighted on 16 May 1660 and created baronet of Cottesbrooke in the County of Northampton on 7 June 1660 in recompense for his sufferings in the royal cause.

Langham died at the age of 87. He had married Mary Bunce, daughter of James Bunce and was succeeded in the baronetcy by their son James.

Parliament of England
Preceded by Robert Tichborne; John Ireton; Samuel Moyer; John Langley; John Stone Henry Barton Praise-God Barebone	Member of Parliament for City of London; 1654; With: Sir Thomas Adams, Bt; Thomas Foote; William Steele; Samuel Avery; Andrew Riccard	Succeeded by Thomas Foote; Sir Theophilus Biddulph, Bt; Sir Thomas Adams, Bt; Sir Richard Browne, Bt; John Jones; Sir Christopher Pack
Preceded by George Thomson; Andrew Brewer	Member of Parliament for Southwark; 1660; With: Sir Thomas Bloodworth	Succeeded by Sir Thomas Bloodworth; George Moore
Baronetage of England
New creation	Baronet (of Cottesbrooke); 1660–1671	Succeeded by James Langham
