= Sir William Wilde, 1st Baronet =

Member of the Parliament of England

Sir William Wilde, 1st Baronet (c. 1611 – 23 November 1679) was an English judge and politician who sat in the House of Commons in 1660.

Wilde was the eldest son of William Wilde, vintner of Bread Street, London. He was a student of Clifford's Inn and of Inner Temple in 1630. In 1637 he was called to the bar. He was Recorder of London from 1659 to 1668. On 27 Mar 1660 he was elected Member of Parliament for the City of London in the Convention Parliament.

On 13 Sep 1660, Wilde was created a baronet. He was appointed King's Serjeant on 10 November 1661. He was made one of the judges of the court of common pleas in 1668 and advanced to become a justice of the King's Bench on 21 January 1672. He was described as a "grave and venerable judge" and was deprived of his office a few months before his death because he disbelieved the evidence of Bedlow in the "Popish Plot".

Wilde was succeeded by his son Sir Felix Wilde, 2nd Baronet.

Parliament of England
Preceded by Isaac Penington	Member of Parliament for the City of London; 1660–1661; With: William Vincent; Richard Browne; John Robinson	Succeeded by John Fowke; Sir William Thompson; William Love; John Jones
Baronetage of England
New creation	Baronet (of London); 1660–1679	Succeeded by Felix Wilde
