= John Jones (Parliamentarian) =

English merchant and politician

John Jones (c. 1610 – 21 May 1692) was an English merchant and politician who sat in the House of Commons at various times between 1656 and 1679. He fought for the Parliamentary cause in the English Civil War.

Jones was born in the parish of St Chad, Shrewsbury, and was educated at the Shrewsbury grammar school. He went to London in 1629 and was a member of the Worshipful Company of Grocers by 1633. In 1640 he was ranked in the third class of "able inhabitants". In 1641 he was a member of the Honourable Artillery Company. He was a militant Presbyterian and served as captain of militia for London during the English Civil War. He was a common councilman from 1645 to 1647, elder of 7th class in 1646 and commissioner for militia 1647. In 1647, he was in favour of a negotiated settlement with the King, and was put under arrest.

In 1656, in spite of holding no company nor municipal office, Jones was elected Member of Parliament for City of London for the Second Protectorate Parliament. He was re-elected MP for London in 1659 for the Third Protectorate Parliament. In 1661 he was re-elected MP for London for the Cavalier Parliament. He was very active in parliament. mainly concerning matters relating to trade and particularly the City of London. He opposed for example the building of Putney Bridge which he saw as a threat to London's trade.

In January 1660, he was commissioner for assessment for Middlesex. He became assistant of the Grocers' Company in May 1660 and was again member of the Honourable Artillery Company in July 1660. He was commissioner for assessment for London and Middlesex from 1661 to 1680 and commissioner for assessment for Surrey from 1661 to 1673.

He was commissioner for recusants for London in 1675. In 1679 after the Cavalier Parliament was dissolved he retired to his country estate at Hampton, Middlesex. He remained an assistant of the Grocers' Company under the new charter of 1684. He was commissioner for assessment for Middlesex from 1689 to 1690.

Jones died on 21 May 1692 and was buried at St Bartholomew by the Exchange. He left a personal estate of around £20,000, most of which went to charity. He endowed five parishes in Shropshire and his endowment for Hampton School, prescribed that the Anglican catechism should be taught there.

Jones married Elizabeth Smith of London on 15 April 1632 and had a daughter.

Parliament of England
Preceded by Thomas Adams; Thomas Foote; William Steele; John Langham; Samuel Avery; Andrew Riccard	Member of Parliament for London; 1656–1659; With: Theophilus Biddulph; Richard Browne 1656–1659; Thomas Adams 1656; Thomas Foote 1656; Sir Christopher Pack 1656; William Thompson 1659	Succeeded by Isaac Pennington
