= Hale Commission =

1652 English law reform panel

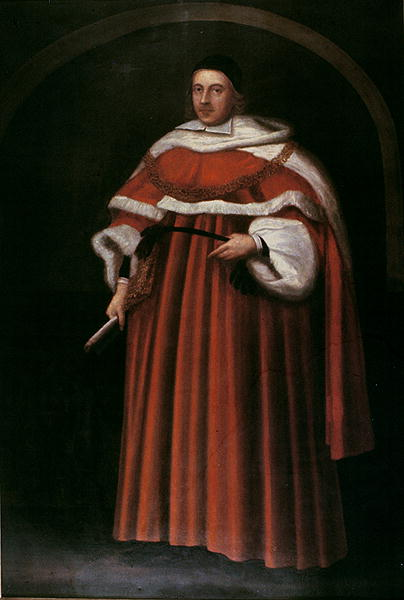
Sir Matthew Hale, chairman of the Commission

The Hale Commission was established by the Commonwealth of England on 30 January 1652 and led by Sir Matthew Hale to investigate law reform. Consisting of eight lawyers and thirteen laymen, the Commission met approximately three times a week and proposed changes as radical (at the time) as reducing the use of the death penalty, allowing witnesses, legal aid and lawyers for defendants in criminal cases and creating county courts and a court of appeal for criminal cases. Though the Commission was unsuccessful at passing any of its measures under the Rump Parliament, two of its measures were put into law by the subsequent Barebone's Parliament, and, by the middle of the 20th century, most of the others were as well. Debate has occurred over the effectiveness and strife within the Commission between its more moderate and radical members; the general conclusion is that with the sheer volume of work produced and the vast proportion of moderate to radical members, it is unlikely such strife existed.

== Background and establishment ==
The execution of Charles I during the English Civil War led to the establishment of the Commonwealth of England on 19 May 1649. During the rule of both the Commonwealth and the succeeding Protectorate, there was considerable desire for law reform. Many judges and lawyers were corrupt, and criminal law followed no real reason or philosophy. Any felony was punishable by death, proceedings were in a form of Norman French (which was no longer a common language even among the ruling class), and judges regularly imprisoned jurors for reaching a verdict they disagreed with. Cromwell and the Rump Parliament aimed to establish a "new society", which included reforming the law; to that end, on 30 January 1652 Sir Matthew Hale was appointed chairman of a commission to investigate law reform, which soon became known as the Hale Commission. The Commission's official remit was defined by the Commons; "taking into consideration what inconveniences there are in the law; and how the mischiefs which grow from delays, the chargeableness and irregularities in the proceedings in the law may be prevented, and the speediest way to reform the same, and to present their opinions to such committee as the Parliament shall appoint".

The Commission consisted of eight lawyers and thirteen laymen, appointed by the Rump Parliament on 26 December 1651, and sat from 23 January 1652 approximately three times a week in the chamber of the House of Lords. No Members of Parliament were allowed to sit. In addition to Hale, members included John Desborough, John Rushworth, Hugh Peters, Anthony Cooper, John Sadler, John Fountaine, William Steele, Henry Blount, William Roberts, Josiah Bemers, Samuel Moyer, Charles George Cock (Note: admiralty judge under the Protectorate, father-in-law of Sir Isaac Preston (died 1708) of Beeston St Lawrence, Norfolk.) and Matthew Thomlinson.

== Recommendations ==
The Commission recommended various changes. On the criminal law side, they supported reducing the use of the death penalty, although "wilful murderers" were still to be executed, and the abduction of a child under 16 was to be considered a capital crime. They also suggested allowing prisoners access to lawyers in any case where the prosecution was permitted representation and allowing witnesses for the defence to give evidence under oath. Legal aid was also considered, although the rejection of a case where legal aid was given would result in the defendant being sent to a workhouse for a month and whipped. The abolition of peine forte et dure as a way to avoid the forfeiture of land was also proposed.

For legal system reform, the Commission suggested the creation of county courts led by the Westminster judges with jurisdiction over civil actions, and small claims courts for amounts under £4 to be manned by commissioners, approved by justices of the peace. They also supported the creation of a Court of Appeal consisting of laymen chosen by parliament, the formation of a land registry and a permanent law commission. Against Hale's wishes, the Commission called for the abolition of benefit of clergy, and the acquittal of those charged with justified homicide. The Commission also suggested that debtors should no longer be imprisoned, and attorneys should be educated at an Inn of Court and not allowed to practise until they were admitted as members.

== Disestablishment ==
None of the Commission's recommendations ever made it into law under the Rump Parliament, though the Commission did produce 16 bills. Several were read in the House of Commons, and the remainder given to the Parliamentary Law Committee in July 1652 following the Committee's dissolution on 23 July. The Rump Parliament's successor, Barebone's Parliament, brought two of the Commission's suggestions (to abolish fines for original writs and to develop procedures for civil marriages) into force through statutes, though these were abrogated, along with all laws passed by the interregnum parliaments without royal assent, at the restoration of Charles II in 1660. Most of the Commission's suggestions were, at some point, followed. In 1837 the use of the death penalty was curtailed, and it was finally abolished, practically in 1969 and completely in 1998. From 1702 onwards, witnesses were allowed for the defence, and the Prisoners' Counsel Act 1836 allowed legal representation for the defendants. The use of peine forte et dure was abolished in 1772, and the benefit of clergy in 1827. A permanent Law Commission was finally established with the Law Commissions Act 1965. County courts were finally established in 1846, and a Court of Criminal Appeal in 1907.

Academic debate over the Commission's value has been strong. On the one hand, William Holdsworth wrote that the Commission was riven by strife between its lawyerly members and those of a more radical nature, and that its proposals were sometimes extreme. Other academics argued that the reform scheme was of great merit, and Hostettler writes that "there is no evidence to confirm the belief of Sir William Holdsworth that the lawyers had a difficult time with the laymen". Mary Cotterell, writing in the English Historical Review, notes that 13 of the 21 members were certainly not radicals, although Moyer, Bemers, Blount and Peters certainly were. The lawyers, all moderates, nevertheless dominated the discussions. Debate was on a highly technical level which prevented many of the laymen contributing much, although six of them had been educated at the Inns of Court. The large number of meetings and sheer volume of work produced also suggests that there was little dissent and argument. John Hostettler, in his biography of Hale, has suggested that if the measures had been put into law immediately, "we would have been honouring such pioneers for their farsightedness in enhancing our legal system and the concept of justice".

== Bibliography ==
- Cotterell, Mary (1968). "Interregnum Law Reform: The Hale Commission of 1652". English Historical Review. 83 (329). Oxford University Press. ISSN 0013-8266.
- Fritze, Ronald H.; Robison, William B. (1996). Historical dictionary of Stuart England, 1603–1689. Greenwood Publishing Group. ISBN 0-313-28391-5.
- Hostettler, John (2002). The Red Gown: The Life and Works of Sir Matthew Hale. Chichester: Barry Rose Law Publishers. ISBN 1-902681-28-2.
