= Committee of Safety (England) =

Parliamentary body that oversaw the English Civil War

The Committee of Safety, established by the Parliamentarians in July 1642, was the first of a number of successive committees set up to oversee the English Civil War against King Charles I, and the Interregnum.

== 1642–1644 ==
The initial committee of safety consisted of five members of the House of Lords: the Earls of Essex, Holland, Northumberland, Pembroke, and Viscount Saye-and-Sele; and ten members of the House of Commons: Nathaniel Fiennes, John Glynn, John Hampden, Denzil Holles, Henry Marten, Sir John Merrick, William Pierrepoint, John Pym, Sir Philip Stapleton, and Sir William Waller. It sat until 1644 when Parliament and their new Scottish allies agreed to replace it with the Committee of Both Kingdoms.

== 1647 ==
The Presbyterians in the House of Commons set up a new committee of safety, to coordinate defence of London and Parliament from the New Model Army which was advancing on London with demands that the Presbyterians did not wish to meet. When it became clear that the populace did not support them, the committee was dissolved and the Presbyterians fled.

== 1659 ==
There were two committees of safety in 1659. The first was set up on 7 May, on the authority of the Rump Parliament, to replace the Lord Protector Richard Cromwell's Council of State. It initially had seven members: Charles Fleetwood, Sir Arthur Hesilrige, Sir Henry Vane the Younger, Edmund Ludlow, William Sydenham, Richard Salwey, and John Jones. Two days later on 9 May four more men were appointed to the committee John Lambert, John Desborough, James Berry and Thomas Scot. It was only a temporary expediency and was dissolved two weeks later when on 19 May a new Council of State was appointed.

The last Committee of Safety was set up on 26 October 1659 by the high command of the New Model Army just before the Restoration. It was set up in response to the Rump Parliament which the day before tried to place the commander of the army Charles Fleetwood as chief of a military council under the authority of the speaker. The members of the last committee were:

- Henry Vane the Younger (Note: Sat on both 1659 committees)
- Bulstrode Whitelocke
- William Sydenham
- John Lambert
- James Berry
- Lord Warriston (Archibald Johnston)
- Edmund Ludlow
- Richard Salwey
- John Desborough
- Charles Fleetwood
- Sir James Harrington
- William Steele
- Walter Strickland
- Henry Lawrence
- John Ireton
- Robert Tichborne
- Henry Brandrith
- Robert Thomson
- John Hewson
- John Clark (or John Clerk)
- Robert Lilburne
- Robert Bennet
- Cornelius Holland
