= Thomas Andrewes =

English financier and Lord Mayor of London

Sir Thomas Andrewes

Lord Mayor of the City of London
- In office 1649–1649
- Preceded by: Abraham Reynardson
- Succeeded by: Thomas Foote

Lord Mayor of the City of London
- In office 1650–1651
- Preceded by: Thomas Foote
- Succeeded by: John Kendricke

Personal details
- Died: 1659
- Occupation: Financier

Sir Thomas Andrewes (died 1659) was a London financier who supported the parliamentary cause during the English Civil Wars, and sat as a commissioner at the High Court of Justice for the trial of Charles I. During the Third English Civil War, as Lord Mayor of London, he made sure that there was no trouble in London. During the Interregnum he supported Oliver Cromwell, and was knighted by him in 1657. Many sources confuse him with another Thomas Andrewes, who had a more prominent role in the British East India Company and was a contemporary of the London politician; this other Andrewes was still alive in 1660.

== Life ==
In the 1620s Andrewes followed the lead of his father Robert and traded with the Plymouth Colony. During the 1630s he traded with the New England colonies, and as a member of the guild of the Leathersellers' Company, ran a successful wholesale linen drapery business at the White Lion, Fish Street Hill. By the end of the decade he had been the master of the guild (from 1638 to 1639), and had made enough money to become an undersharer holder in a syndicate that farmed customs (a speculative venture where the syndicate paid the Crown a fixed sum against the hope of collecting a larger sum from those who owed custom revenue to the Crown).

Andrewes was a devout Puritan who in the late 1630s followed Sidrach Simpson to Rotterdam to join his congregation. When Simpson first returned to London his congregation met at Andrewes' house.

During the 1640s Andrewes continued to develop his businesses linked to foreign trade. He was involved in trade in the Caribbean, and with Maurice Thompson and Samuel Moyer he financed trading ventures with west Africa.

In 1642 at the start of the Civil War Andrewes was a member of the committee which oversaw the City of London militia, a body of men willing to defend London against the Cavaliers (see for example the Battle of Turnham Green). It was also during 1642 that he became an Alderman of the City and a Sheriff of London. Thanks to his financial success, he was able to lend large sums to help parliament finance the war, and involved himself in the financial administration of the parliamentary cause. Between 1642 and 1645 he took on many treasurerships for the army and parliament. Two of the more significant were commissioner for the customs (appointed 1643), and, in 1645, one of the treasurers for war. Mark Noble notes that these treasury positions were very lucrative and states that as Treasurer of the money and plate sent to Guildhall, he and Lord Say and Sele obtained very large sums, and as Treasurer at War his salary was three-pence in the pound. For his own financial benefit and to improve his social status he purchased lands sequestrated by parliament from bishops.

In 1647 Andrewes was appointed to the new militia committee which oversaw new militia set up under the auspices of the New Model Army. In 1648 he supported Pride's Purge and the other moves made by the Grandees in the New Model Army.

Andrewes sat as a commissioner at the trial of Charles I in January 1649. He attended the trial in Westminster Hall on 2 and 23 January, and on the 27th he, along with the other commissioners present, stood up to indicate his assent to the death sentence. He did not sign the warrant, but was present at King Charles I's execution on 30 January 1649, and in March, when the Rump Parliament passed the Act abolishing the Office of King, he was responsible for proclaiming the abolition of monarchy in the City of London.

In April that year Andrewes was appointed to succeed Abraham Reynardson, the Royalist Lord Mayor of London, on the latter's deposition in April 1649. Having served until the following October, he was, after a year's interval, again chosen for the year 1650–1651. His successful performance of his duties during his second period as Lord Mayor was of importance to the Commonwealth as he was responsible for keeping the capital quiet, and a bulwark against any resurgence of Royalism in support of the King Chales II during the third English Civil War.

Noble asserts that Andrewes fell out with Oliver Cromwell over Cromwell becoming Lord Protector, and by presenting a petition, of a dangerous nature, he fell under the displeasure of the Protector Oliver. However, in the much more modern Oxford Dictionary of National Biography A. W. McIntosh states that "he was a firm supporter of Oliver Cromwell and republicanism in the moderate City government in the fifties[, and] was knighted by Cromwell in 1657".

In the 1650s Andrewes continued a successful business career. In 1657 he became deputy governor of the East India Company and may have been its governor in 1659. He also acquired more sequestered properties including Mucking Hall in Essex.

There is no record of the place and date of his death, but he was buried on 20 August 1659. A year later the political landscape had changed and the monarchy had been restored. Under Section XXXVIII of the Indemnity and Oblivion Act, he, like the other dead regicides, was not exempted from the general pardon so that his property could be sequestrated by the state. According to Noble "To the Royalists he was peculiarly obnoxious, as one of the High Court of Justice, where he had assisted in the condemnation of other illustrious characters, besides the unhappy monarch. ... Had he lived to have seen the return of his banished Sovereign, he would either have expiated his crime by an ignominious and painful death, or spent the remainder of his life in poverty and imprisonment."

== Family ==
Thomas Andrewes was the son of Robert Andrewes of Feltham, Middlesex, and Margaret, his wife. Robert was a Plymouth merchant and a subscriber to the Massachusetts Bay Company. Thomas married Eleanor, daughter of Henry Bonwick of Horsley in Surrey. They had a number of children, of which five survived them: four sons and a daughter.

== Notes ==
Civic offices
Preceded by Abraham Reynardson	Lord Mayor of the City of London; 1649	Succeeded by Thomas Foote
Preceded by Thomas Foote	Lord Mayor of the City of London; 1650	Succeeded by John Kendricke
