= John Wollaston =

John Wollaston may refer to:

- John Wollaston (priest) (1791–1856), Anglican clergyman and settler in Western Australia
- John Wollaston (painter) (active 1742–1775), English painter of portraits active in the British colonies in North America
- John Wollaston (Lord Mayor) (died 1658), English merchant who was Lord Mayor of London in 1643
