= Nicholas Barbon =

English economist, physician, life insurance pioneer

- Born: c. 1640; London
- Died: c. 1698; Osterley House, Middlesex
- Other names: Nicholas Barebon; Nicholas Barebone; If-Jesus-Christ-had-not-died-for-thee-thou-hadst-been-damned; Unless-Jesus-Christ-had-died-for-thee-thou-hadst-been-damned
- Occupations: Physician; economist; builder
- Known for: Fire insurance; property development; economic theory; speculation; middle name

Nicholas Barbon (c. 1640 – c. 1698) was an English physician, real estate developer, and financier. He is regarded as one of the first economists and introduced several key innovations in the field of financial markets and insurance.

Initially trained as a physician, in the aftermath of the Great Fire of London, he became a property developer. In this role, he introduced significant innovations. He is credited as introducing several important types of financial instrument including fire insurance and mortgages, founding England's first insurance agency and the first bank to issue mortgages.

Barbon was also one of the first economists, writing books about commerce, international trade, finance and state policy, presenting ideas that were heterodox in his day but are now foundational to modern economics. Economic historians consider him one of the first writers to attack mercantilism and promote free trade, as well as one of the first to systematically examine the money supply and economic growth.

== Early life ==
Nicholas Barbon was born in London in either 1637 or 1640. He was the eldest son of Praise-God Barebone (or Barbon), the namesake of Barebone's Parliament of 1653, the predecessor of Oliver Cromwell's Protectorate. Praise-God Barebone was a Fifth Monarchist who purportedly gave Nicholas the baptismal name "If-Jesus-Christ-had-not-died-for-thee-thou-hadst-been-damned", an example of a hortatory name, a type of virtue name that was common among some Dissenting families in 17th-century England. Conflicting sources claim the name "Unless-Jesus-Christ-Had-Died-For-Thee-Thou-Hadst-Been-Damned" was given to Nicholas' father or to his uncle and Nicholas' hortatory name was supposedly a variant on this name.

Barbon became a religious separatist with Millenarianist beliefs, including fervent advocacy of infant baptism in particular. He studied medicine at the Universities of Leiden and Utrecht in the Netherlands, and received his Doctor of Medicine qualification from the latter in 1661. Three years later, he became an honorary fellow of the Royal College of Physicians in London.

== Property development ==
He soon turned from the medical profession to the building trade, which suddenly became important in 1666 when the Great Fire of London devastated most of the City of London which at the time was separated from Westminster, the seat of Britain's government, by two miles of countryside, dotted with grand mansions. Within a few years he was "the most prominent London builder of his age". He built houses streets at a time, often around squares, and his developments were mostly to the west of the City of London, where land was plentiful.

Barbon was responsible for joining the city to the seat of government at Westminster for the first time as a result of developments along the Strand, Bloomsbury, St Giles and Holborn. Barbon did this despite long-established restrictions on new buildings associated with various Acts of Parliament and royal declarations in the late 16th century: he often simply disregarded legal and local objections, demolished existing buildings without permission and rebuilt speculatively in search of a quick profit.

On 11 June 1684, Barbon's expansionary speculation brought him and his building tradesmen into conflict with lawyers based at Gray's Inn. Barbon started his largest project yet, the redevelopment of Red Lion Square, and environs in Holborn without being authorised to do so. The Gray's Inn lawyers, Inns of Court adjacent saw their rural outlooks jeopardised, and started physical fist fights with Barbon's workmen, but the developer and his men fought back. The lawyers subsequently obtained warrants for his arrest but Barbon had these set aside and the development scheme was completed. Another setback came when houses he had built at Mincing Lane collapsed because of inadequate foundations.

"He was unique in the unscrupulousness and brazenness of his business tactics" and his contemporary Roger North, who studied his dealings and interviewed him on the subject, called him "an exquisite mob master" in recognition of his ability to manipulate people to carry out his schemes.

== Insurance and mortgages ==
At the same time, Barbon took an interest in the development of insurance and the banking industry, and helped to pioneer both. In 1680–81, with 11 associates, he founded an "Insurance Office for Houses" which offered fire insurance for up to 5,000 households in London. Fires were a major danger in London at the time: the Great Fire destroyed more than 13,000 houses and displaced about 100,000 people, and another conflagration in 1678 damaged the Middle Temple, one of the Inns of Court. In 1690, together with John Asgill, he founded the National Land Bank. This was Britain's first land bank—a financial institution which issued loans in the form of mortgages against real estate.

These were popular with landowners because they could now raise money against the value of their main asset. The bank was moderately successful, and even threatened to usurp the Bank of England in 1696. The government budget deficit had grown to an unsustainable level; Barbon merged the National Land Bank with another institution (founded by John Briscoe) to form Land Bank United, and offered the government a £2 million loan (£326 million as of 2025). The scheme foundered when Barbon and Briscoe could not raise enough money, and Land Bank United was demerged.

Barbon was also active in other fields during the 1690s. Largely in order to take advantage of Parliamentary privilege and thus gain immunity from prosecution by his creditors he bought a number of burgages in the rotten borough of Bramber in Sussex, which enabled him to be elected one of its Members of Parliament in 1690 and 1695. Another project involved trying to pump drinking water from the River Thames, to be piped to his new building developments. He patented a design in 1694, and tried to sell pumping rights alongside fire insurance contracts.

== Economic theory ==
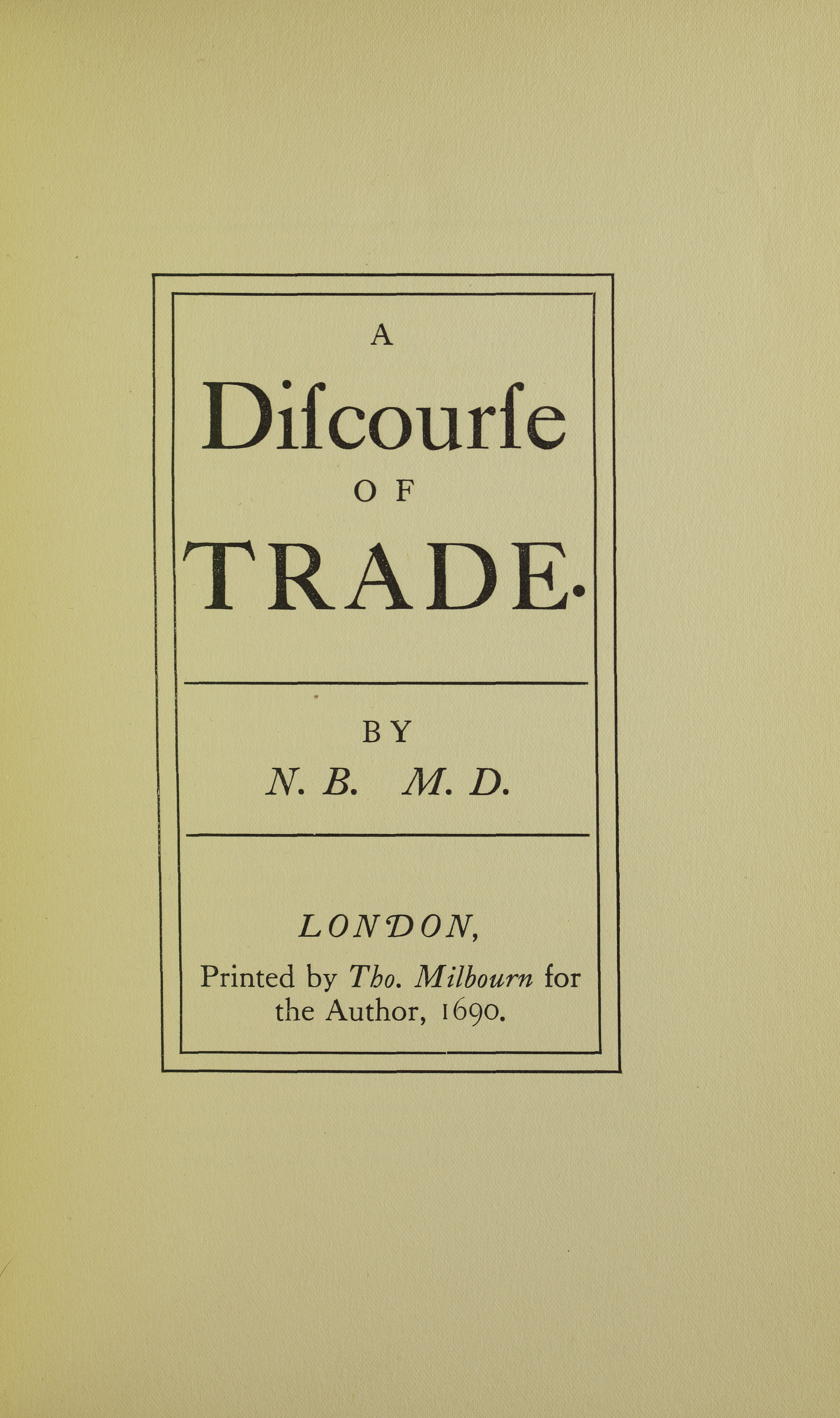
A Discourse of Trade (1690)

During the later part of his life, Nicholas Barbon wrote extensively on economic theory. His pamphlets and books on political economy are considered important because of their innovative views on money, trade (especially free trade) and supply and demand. His works, especially A Discourse of Trade (written in 1690), influenced and drew praise from 20th-century economists such as John Maynard Keynes (in The General Theory of Employment, Interest and Money) and Joseph Schumpeter. Karl Marx cites his work, notably A Discourse on Coining the New Money Lighter of (1696) in Das Capital. He was one of several late 17th-century economic, social and political theorists with a medical education background; contemporaries included Benjamin Worsley, Hugh Chamberlen, William Petty and John Locke.

His early writings sought to explain and advertise his insurance and mortgage schemes and his building developments; for example, in his Apology for the Builder: or a Discourse showing the Cause and Effects of the Increase of Building of 1685—written in the aftermath of his fight with the lawyers of Gray's Inn—Barbon justified (anonymously) his expansionary building policy by describing the benefits it would bring to London and Britain as a whole. His A Discourse of Trade, written five years later, was much more significant, however. As a broad explanation of his economic and political views, it brought together all of his ideas and became the basis for his reputation as an economic theorist.

Barbon observed the power of fashion and luxury goods to enhance trade. Fashion demanded the replacement of goods before they had worn out; he believed this directed people towards the continuous purchasing of goods, which therefore created constant demand. These views were contrary to standard moral values of the time, influenced by the government and the church. He was one of the earliest writers to draw this distinction between the moral and economic aspects of purchasing.

His views on interest were praised by Joseph Schumpeter. Barbon described as a "mistake" the standard view that interest is a monetary value, arguing that because money is typically borrowed to buy assets (goods and stock), the interest that is charged on the loan is a type of rent—"a payment for the use of goods". From this, Schumpeter extrapolated the argument that just as rent is the price paid for the use of what he called "unwrought stock, or the natural agents of [economic] production", interest is the price paid for "wrought stock—the produced means of production".

One of the main arguments in A Discourse of Trade was that money did not have enough intrinsic value to justify a government's hoarding of it; policies intended to help accumulate supposedly "valuable" commodities such as silver and gold were not appropriate, because the laws of supply and demand were the main determiner of their value. Such criticism of mercantilism—the view that a country's prosperity can be measured by its stock of bullion—helped to lay the foundation for classical economics, and was unusual at the time. Along with John Locke, with whom he debated his theories, Barbon was one of the first theorists to argue that money's value was principally symbolic and that its main function was to assist trade. These views were expanded upon in his 1696 pamphlet, A Discourse Concerning Coining the New Money Lighter.

Barbon was influenced by populationism; he identified a country's wealth with its population. He also advocated the use of paper and credit money, and postulated the reduction of interest rates, which he thought impeded the growth in manufacturing and trade. He discussed these issues in his 1696 pamphlet, which also considered the effects of the Recoinage of that year, in which the Royal Mint recalled large quantities of silver coins, melted them down and reminted them, resulting in a temporary fall in the supply of money.

Despite the importance of some of his theories, Barbon's work (especially A Discourse of Trade) has been criticised for an excess of "definition and classification" instead of analysis and a disjointed style which lacked rigour. This has been attributed to the early period in which he wrote, when economic thought was not yet fully developed.

== Later life and death ==
Barbon built a house for himself and his business interests in Crane Court, off Fleet Street, but later moved to Osterley House, a large 16th-century mansion west of London.

By the time of his death, Barbon had built or financed developments to the value of £200,000 (£29.8 million as of 2025) according to Sir John Lowther, 1st Viscount Lonsdale.

He died at Osterley in 1698 or 1699. His will was written in May 1698 and his executors received probate on 6 February 1699.

== Memorial ==
Barbon Close, opposite Great Ormond Street Children's Hospital in central London, is named after him, as is Barbon Alley off Devonshire Square.

== Works ==
- A Discourse Shewing the Great Advantages that New-buildings and the Enlarging of Towns and Cities do Bring to a Nation (1678)
- A Letter to a Gentleman in the Country, Giving an Account of the Two Insurance - Offices; the Fire-Office & Friendly-Society (1684)
- Apology for the Builder; or a Discourse showing the Cause and Effects of the Increase of Building (1685)
- A Discourse of Trade (1690)
- An Answer to Paper Entituled, Reasons against Reducing Interest to Four per Cent (1694)
- A Discourse Concerning Coining the New Money Lighter (1696)

== Notes ==
Parliament of England
Preceded by John Alford	Member of Parliament for Bramber with John Radcliffe 1690–1695; William Stringer 1695–1698; 1690–1698	Succeeded by Sir Henry Furnese
