= John Kendrick (lord mayor) =

English merchant and politician

Sir John Kendrick (or Kendricke; died 1661) was an English merchant and politician who was Lord Mayor of London in 1651.

== Family ==
John Kendrick was the son of Hugh Kendrick, of Chester, and his wife Anne Moulson. His paternal family was kin to the Kendrick baronets as well as the merchant John Kendrick. His maternal grandparents were Sir Thomas Moulson, the Lord Mayor of London in 1634, and his wife Ann (Radcliffe) Mowlson, whose children died young. (In his will Moulson referred to his sister Kendrick.) John Kendrick seems to have had five sisters.

Kendrick married Katherine Evelyn, a cousin of the noted author John Evelyn, and is mentioned in Evelyn's famous diary as "a fanatic Lord Mayor, who had married a relation of ours."

== Career ==
Kendrick was a member of London's Grocer's Company, one of the city's livery companies. He was elected as Sheriff of London in 1645, serving alongside future mayor Thomas Foote. He was elected Lord Mayor of London in 1651.

Kendrick was noted as a staunch Puritan and Republican. He was one of the aldermen who in 1648 was appointed by Parliament as part of a committee to form a militia to defend the rights and liberties of the city of London. During his mayoral term, he witnessed the Oath of Abjuration undertaken by William Petre, 4th Baron Petre to regain his lost estates by renouncing Catholicism. He also was the primary audience for a sermon by the Puritan divine Nathaniel Holmes after a great eclipse during his mayoralty. He had business dealings with the Irish faith healer Valentine Greatrakes, who purchased an interest in Kendrick's estates in Tipperary.

== Death ==
Kendrick died in 1661. His old associate Valentine Greatrakes acted as a representative for his heirs; several former owners of Kendrick's Irish estates sought to repossess the estates under the Act of Settlement 1662, and Greatrakes assisted Kendrick's heirs in their efforts to keep their inheritance intact.

Civic offices
Preceded by Thomas Andrewes	Lord Mayor of the City of London; 1651	Succeeded by John Fowke
