= Walter Strickland =

English politician and diplomat

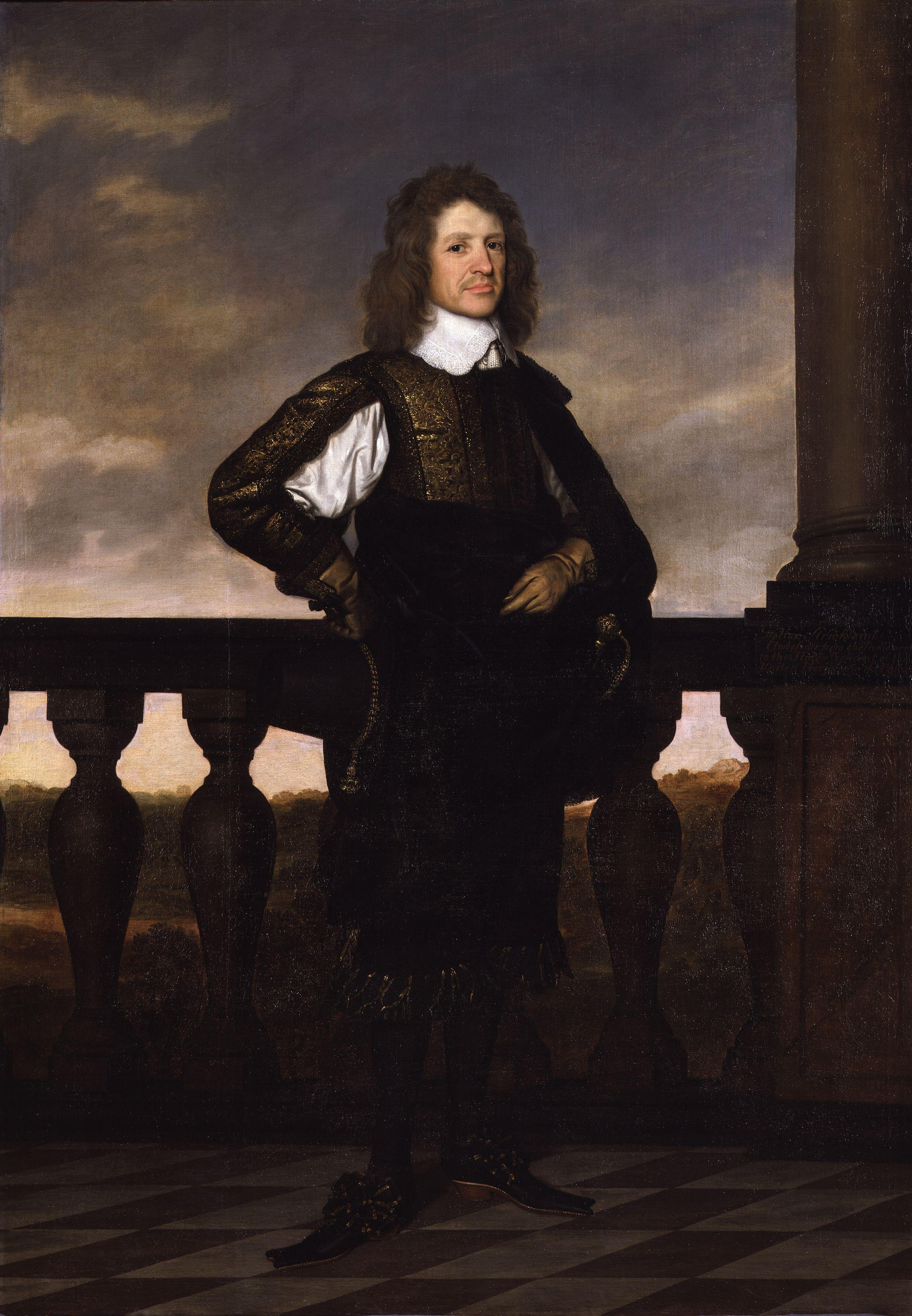
Walter Strickland by Pieter Nason

Walter Strickland (1598? – 1 November 1671) was an English politician and diplomat who held high office during the Protectorate.

== Biography ==
Strickland was the younger son of Walter Strickland of Boynton. His elder brother, William, was knighted in 1630 and created a baronet in 1641, and was a Member of Parliament from 1640 to 1660. Like his brother, Walter was educated at Queens' College, Cambridge and Gray's Inn. In his youth he was nicknamed "Wild Walter" for his reckless irresponsible behaviour: on one occasion he was said to have ridden his horse over the roof of a local church.

Following the outbreak of civil war in 1642, Strickland was appointed by Parliament as their Ambassador-General to the United Provinces of the Netherlands. Although his complaints to the States General about the assistance given by William II, Prince of Orange to Charles I bore little fruit, his efforts were judged satisfactory and he was voted a salary of £400 per annum, remaining at the Hague and hindering as far as he could the attempts of the Royalists to raise money and troops. In 1648 he briefly returned to England but was quickly reappointed, his salary having been raised to £600. The posting was a dangerous one, as most of the Dutch supported the Royalists: Strickland was frequently threatened, and his colleague Isaac Dorislaus was killed. Dorislaus, a Hollander in English service, was appointed by Parliament as ambassador in addition to Strickland. A few days after his arrival he was murdered in cold blood by some Scottish royalists from Montrose following. Only after the death of King Charles (Jan. 1649) were Orangeist fanatics attacking English Parliamentarians. The sympathies of the Dutch people were universally for Parliamentarians.

In June 1650 Strickland was recalled and received the thanks of Parliament, but the following year after the death of William II of Orange (which to the stricter English Puritans looked like God's judgement against him for his protection of the Stuarts), he was again sent to the Netherlands, accompanying Oliver St John in his famous and unsuccessful embassy. They proposed a close alliance against the Catholic world and ideally a merger of the two commonwealths into a single state, offering to restrain the English commercial-interest party, which saw the Dutch as their greatest opponents. However, neither the regents nor the Dutch populace had the least enthusiasm for a Protestant crusade, and Strickland and St John were unable to overcome their hostility. They returned home with no arguments to restrain unfettered commercial competition with the Dutch, and relations quickly deteriorated into the First Anglo-Dutch War.

Strickland had been elected to Parliament as member for Minehead in 1645, and from his final return from Holland in 1651 began to play an active role. He was elected to the third (1651) and fifth (1652) councils of state of the Commonwealth, and after the expulsion of the Rump was one of four civilians on the council of thirteen elected by the army to rule in Parliament's stead.

Strickland was subsequently a member of the nominated Barebone's Parliament and of both councils of state appointed by it. In 1654 he was made captain of the grey-coated foot-guards, who waited upon the Protector at Whitehall. This position gave him a prominent part in the second investiture of the Lord Protector. After the establishment of the Protectorate sat in the Parliaments of 1654 (for the East Riding) and 1656 (for Newcastle) and was a member of both councils of state established during Cromwell's rule. In December 1657 he was appointed to Cromwell's “House of Lords” — a "peerage" which of course did not survive the Restoration.

After Oliver Cromwell's death, Strickland was a member of Richard Cromwell’s council. When the Long Parliament was reinstated he resumed his seat, and was a member of the Committee of Safety appointed by the army in October 1659. After the restoration of the Charles II he was not considered dangerous.

== Family ==
Strickland married Anne Morgan, daughter of Sir Charles Morgan, the governor of Bergen op Zoom; she was naturalised by an act of Parliament in February 1651. They had no children.
