= Moyer baronets =

Extinct baronetcy in the Baronetage of England

The Moyer Baronetcy, of Petsey Hall in the County of Essex, was a title in the Baronetage of England. It was created on 25 March 1701 for Samuel Moyer, a London merchant. He was the son of Samuel Moyer, also a merchant, and High Sheriff of Essex in 1698. The title became extinct on Moyer's death in 1716.

== Moyer baronets, of Petsey Hall (1701) ==
- Sir Samuel Moyer, 1st Baronet (c. 1643–1716)
