= Richard Adams (poet) =

English lawyer and collector of verse

Richard Adams (1619–1661) was an English lawyer remembered as the compiler of an early collection of verse.

== Biography ==
Richard Adams, the second son of Sir Thomas Adams, alderman of London, was born on 6 January 1619; admitted fellow-commoner of Catherine Hall, Cambridge, 28 April 1635; died 13 June 1661.

Among the Harleian Collection is a thin quarto (No. 3889) lettered on the outside ‘R. Adams. Poems.’ One or two short pieces of inferior merit are signed ‘R. Adams,’ or ‘R. A.,’ but most of the poems in the collection are accessible in print. Like so many of the manuscript collections of the seventeenth century, Harl. MS. 3889 is no doubt a medley of verses by various hands. Adams certainly cannot be the author of the delightful song, ‘Pan, leave piping, the gods have done feasting’ (sometimes called ‘The Green Gown,’ or ‘The Fetching Home of the May’), for the words of that song were composed, according to the best authority, not later than 1635. The capital verses on ‘Oliver Routing the Rump, 1653,’ beginning ‘Will you heare a strange thing never heard of before?’ were first printed in the Merry Drollery, 1661, p. 53; they reappeared in Wit and Drollery, 1661, p. 260; and in Merry Drollery Compleat, 1670, and again in Loyal Songs, 1731; oddly enough, they are not in the Rump Collection. This song is unsigned in Adams's commonplace book; and, according to A. H. Bullen in the Dictionary of National Biography, "judging from the signed verses it is far better than anything he could have written".
