= John Dethick =

Sir John Dethick

Lord Mayor of London
- In office October 1655 – October 1656
- Preceded by: Christopher Packe
- Succeeded by: Robert Tichborne

Personal details
- Died: 1671

Sir John Dethick (died 1671) was Lord Mayor of London in 1656 during the Protectorate.

== Biography ==
John Dethick was the son of John Dethick of West Newington, Norfolk, and Elizabeth, daughter of Thomas Methwold. He was a member of the Worshipful Company of Mercers, Lord Mayor of London in 1656, and knighted by the Lord Protector Oliver Cromwell on 15 September 1656. He died in 1671 at his country estate at Tottenham in Middlesex and was buried in the church of St Andrew Undershaft in London.

== Family ==
Dethick married firstly Ann, daughter of Francis Smallpiece of Norwich and widow of Thomas Anguish. He married secondly Martha, daughter of Edmund Travers of London. He married thirdly Anne, daughter of Thomas Jolliff of Leek in Staffordshire. He had no surviving children from his first or third marriage, but with his second wife Martha he had three children:

- Benjamin, who married Mary, daughter of John Harrison, a London merchant.
- Elizabeth, who married Sir John Banks.
- Susan, who married Edward Rudge, a London merchant.
