= Sir Richard Browne, 2nd Baronet =

Member of the Parliament of England

Sir Sir Richard Browne, 2nd Baronet
- Born: before 1634
- Died: September 1684
- Resting place: Debden, Essex
- Education: Lincoln's Inn (admitted 12 November 1646)
- Occupations: Barrister; politician
- Office: Member of Parliament for Wycombe (Convention Parliament, 1660)
- Spouse: Frances Atkins (before 1656)
- Children: Sir Richard Browne, 3rd Baronet

Sir Richard Browne, 2nd Baronet (before 1634 – September 1684) was a barrister and politician who sat in the House of Commons in 1660.

Browne was the son of Sir Richard Browne, 1st Baronet, and his wife Bridget Bryan. He was admitted as a barrister of Lincoln's Inn, on 12 November 1646.

In March 1660, Browne was elected Member of Parliament for Wycombe in the Convention Parliament. There was a double return between Browne and another candidate Scott and Browne was not declared elected until 5 May 1660.

He was knighted on 29 May 1660, and served as Common Serjeant of London from 1661 to 1671. He succeeded his father in the baronetcy in 1669.

Browne died intestate in 1684, and was buried at Debden on 23 September 1684.

Browne married Frances Atkins before 1656 and had one son, Sir Richard Browne, 3rd Baronet.

Parliament of England
| Not represented in the restored Rump | Member of Parliament for Wycombe; With: Edmund Petty | Succeeded by Sir Edmund Pye, Bt; Sir John Borlase, 1st Baronet |
Baronetage of England
| Preceded by Richard Browne | Baronet (of London); 1669–1684 | Succeeded by Richard Browne |
