= Isaac Penington (Lord Mayor) =

English politician (c. 1584–1661)

Sir Isaac Penington
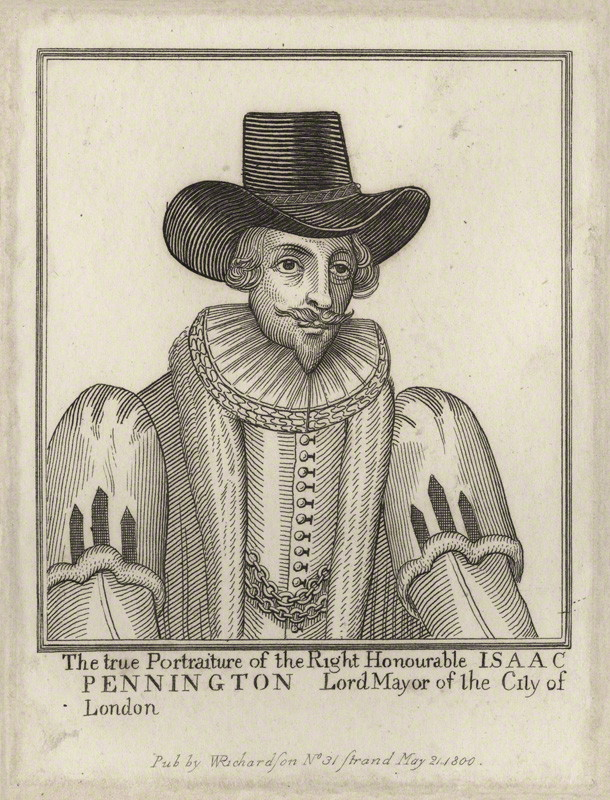

Member of the English Parliament for City of London
- In office 1640–1653
- Preceded by: Parliament suspended since 1629
- Succeeded by: Robert Tichborne; John Ireton; Samuel Moyer; John Langley; John Stone; Henry Barton; Praise-God Barebone

Lord Mayor of London
- In office 1642–1642
- Preceded by: Sir Richard Gurney, 1st Baronet
- Succeeded by: Sir John Wollaston

Personal details
- Born: c. 1584
- Died: 16 December 1661 Tower of London, England
- Children: Isaac Penington; Judith Penington
- Parent: Robert Penington (father)

Sir Isaac Penington (c. 1584 – 16 December 1661) was an English politician who sat in the House of Commons from 1640 to 1653. He was Lord Mayor of London in 1642 and a prominent member of Oliver Cromwell's government.

== Biography ==
Penington was the son of Robert Penington and followed him in becoming a Liveryman of the Worshipful Company of Fishmongers. He inherited several estates from his father and purchased one of his own. He made a fortune as a wine and cloth merchant. From 1626 he acted as financial agent to his second cousin, Admiral John Penington. He increased his commercial holdings in 1629 by becoming a partner in the brewery business of his second wife's family. He and his wife, Mary, the widow of Roger Wilkinson, a Citizen of the City of London, were both staunch Puritans.

In 1638 Penington was elected Sheriff of London and became an alderman of the City of London for Bridge Without ward on 29 January 1639. He was Prime Warden of the Fishmongers Company in 1640.

In April 1640 Penington was elected a member of parliament (MP) for the City of London in the Short Parliament. He was re-elected MP for City of London for the Long Parliament in November 1640 and sat until 1653. On 16 August 1642 Parliament appointed him Lord Mayor of London after removing the Royalist Sir Richard Gurney, 1st Baronet from the position. He became Colonel of the White Regiment, London Trained Bands, in 1642 and from 1642 to 1645 he was Lieutenant of the Tower of London. In that capacity he was present during the execution of William Laud. He became Governor of the Levant Company in 1644, retaining the position to 1654.

In January 1649, Penington was appointed a commissioner of the High Court of Justice at the trial of King Charles, but he was not one of the signatories of the King's death warrant. He served on the Rump's Council of State and on several government committees. He was made a knight in 1649. From 1650 he was the sole representative of the City of London in the Rump Parliament until it was forcibly ejected by Oliver Cromwell on 30 April 1653.

After the Restoration, he was tried for high treason and sentenced to life imprisonment in the Tower of London, where he died on the night of 16 December 1661.

== Marriage and children ==
Penington married twice:

- Firstly, in 1614–15, to Abigail Allen, a daughter of John Allen of the City of London, by whom he had six children:
  - Isaac Penington (1616–1679), the Quaker;
  - Arthur Penington, who became a Roman Catholic priest, and was living in 1676;
  - William Penington (1622–1689), a merchant of London, who also became a quaker and follower of John Perrot;
  - Abigail Penington (married about November 1641);
  - Bridget Penington;
  - Judith Penington. An acquaintance of Samuel Pepys. Letters from Isaac Penington the younger to his sister Judith imply that she also became a quaker.
- Secondly he married Mary Young, a daughter of Matthew Young, and widow of Roger Wilkinson, a Citizen of the City of London.

== See also ==
- List of lord mayors of London
- List of sheriffs of London

== Notes ==
Parliament of England
Vacant Parliament suspended since 1629	Member of Parliament for City of London; 1640–1653; With: Thomas Soame 1640–1648; Samuel Vassall 1640–1648; Matthew Cradock 1640–1641; John Venn 1641–1650	Succeeded by Robert Tichborne; John Ireton; Samuel Moyer; John Langley; John Stone; Henry Barton; Praise-God Barebone
Civic offices
Preceded by Sir Richard Gurney, 1st Baronet	Lord Mayor of London; 1642	Succeeded by Sir John Wollaston
