= John Wollaston (Lord Mayor) =

English merchant and mayor of London

Sir John Wollaston (died April 1658) was an English merchant who was Lord Mayor of London in 1643.

Wollaston was a city of London merchant and a member of the Worshipful Company of Goldsmiths. He was deputy-governor of the Irish Society from 1633 to 1634 and from 1636 to 1637. He was Sheriff of London from 1638 to 1639. On 5 February 1639 he was elected an alderman of the City of London for Farringdon Without ward and was Prime Warden of the Goldsmiths Company from 1639 to 1640. He became a colonel of the London Trained Bands in 1641 and was knighted on 3 December 1641. In 1642 he became alderman for Dowgate ward and colonel of the Yellow Regiment, London Trained Bands. He also became president of the Bethlem and Bridewell. In 1643, he was elected 307th Lord Mayor of London. He became alderman for Aldersgate in 1644 until 1647. In 1649 he became president of Christ's Hospital. He was elected alderman for Bridge Without ward in 1657.

He was buried in the chancel of St. Michael's Chapel, Highgate on 20 April 1658. He founded, in 1658, by bequest, almshouses for six poor women, and endowed them with a rent-charge of £18 10s.

Civic offices
| Preceded by Isaac Penington | Lord Mayor of the City of London; 1643 | Succeeded by Thomas Atkins |
