= Sir Richard Gurney, 1st Baronet =

English merchant

Sir Richard Gurney, 1st Baronet (died 6 October 1647), was an English merchant who was Lord Mayor of London. He supported the Royalist cause in the English Civil War.

Christened on 8 March 1577/8, Gurney was a city of London merchant and a member of the Worshipful Company of Clothworkers. He was Master of the Clothworkers Company in 1633 and Sheriff of London for 1633 to 1634. On 26 August 1634 he was elected an alderman of the City of London for Bishopsgate ward. He was elected instead as alderman for Dowgate ward in 1637. In 1641 he was elected Lord Mayor of London. He was knighted on 25 November 1641 and created a baronet, of London, on 14 December 1641. He was president of Christ's Hospital from 1641 to 1643.

Gurney was a strong supporter of the King and published the King's commission of array. As a result, he was removed from the Mayoralty and impeached by the House of Commons. He refused to surrender the City's sword to anyone but the King.

Gurney's daughter Anne married Thomas Richardson, 2nd Lord Cramond; and his daughter Elizabeth married John Pettus.

== Heraldry ==
The coat of arms of Sir Richard Gurney are blazoned: Paly of six or and azure counterchanged per fess. This is a shield that has been differenced from "Paly of six, or and azure--GOURNAY, or GURNEY, Devon." Sir Richard's family is likely a cadet branch. Crest: A Lion’s Head erased Or, gorged with a Palisado Coronet composed of Spear Heads Azure.

The earlier, now alternate blazon is: Per fess or and azure, paly of six counterchanged. The alternate blazon is exactly of Sir Richard Gurney, alias Gurnard, Lord Mayor of London 1642. (Examined by Sir William Segar Garter Herald, 26 July 1634, when Sir Richard was Sheriff.)

Civic offices
Preceded by Edmund Wright	Lord Mayor of the City of London; 1641	Succeeded by Isaac Penington
Baronetage of England
New creation	Baronet (of London); 1641–1647	Extinct
