= English Council of State =

Executive government of the Commonwealth of England

Council of State
- Flag of the Commonwealth

Agency overview
- Formed: 14 February 1649 (first time); 25 May 1659 (second time)
- Preceding agencies: Charles I (as King); Richard Cromwell (as Lord Protector)
- Dissolved: 30 April 1653 (first time); 28 May 1660 (second time)
- Superseding agencies: Oliver Cromwell (as Lord Protector); Charles II (as King)
- Type: Advisory body
- Status: Executive government
- Headquarters: London, Commonwealth of England
- Agency executive: Arthur Annesley, 1st Earl of Anglesey (last), Lord President

The English Council of State, later also known as the Protector's Privy Council, was first appointed by the Rump Parliament on 14 February 1649 after the execution of King Charles I.

Charles's execution on 30 January was delayed for several hours so that the House of Commons could pass an emergency bill to declare the representatives of the people, the House of Commons, as the source of all just power and to make it an offence to proclaim a new King. This in effect abolished the monarchy and the House of Lords.

== History ==
The Council of State was appointed by Parliament on 14 and 15 February 1649, with further annual elections. The Council's duties were to act as the executive of the country's government in place of the King and the Privy Council. It was to direct domestic and foreign policy and to ensure the security of the English Commonwealth. Due to the disagreements between the New Model Army and the weakened Parliament, it was dominated by the Army.

The Council held its first meeting on 17 February 1649 "with [Oliver] Cromwell in the chair". This meeting was quite rudimentary, "some 14 members" attending, barely more than the legal quorum of nine out of forty-one councillors elected by Parliament. The first elected president of the council, appointed on 12 March, was John Bradshaw who had been the President of the Court at the trial of Charles I and the first to sign the King's death warrant.

The members of the first council were the Earls of Denbigh, Mulgrave, Pembroke, and Salisbury; Lords Grey and Fairfax; Lisle, Rolle, Oliver St John, Wilde, Bradshaw, Cromwell, Skippon, Pickering, Masham, Haselrig, Harington, Vane the Younger, Danvers, Armine, Mildmay, Constable, Pennington, Wilson, Whitelocke, Martin, Ludlow, Stapleton, Heveningham, Wallop, Hutchinson, Bond, Popham, Valentine Walton, Scot, Purefoy, Jones.

When the Rump Parliament was dissolved by Cromwell with the support of the Army Council on 20 April 1653, the Council went into abeyance. It was reconstituted on 29 April with thirteen members seven of whom were Army officers. With the failure of Barebone's Parliament, the Council was re-modelled with the Instrument of Government to become something much closer to the old Privy Council advising the Lord Protector Oliver Cromwell. Constitutionally between thirteen and twenty-one councillors were elected by Parliament to advise the Protector, who was also elected by the Council. In reality Cromwell relied on the Army for support and chose his own councillors.

The replacement constitution of 1657, the pseudo-monarchical Humble Petition and Advice, authorised 'His Highness the Lord Protector'; to choose twenty-one Councillors and the power to nominate his successor. Cromwell recommended his eldest surviving son Richard Cromwell, who was proclaimed the successor on his father's death on 3 September 1658 and legally confirmed in the position by the newly elected Third Protectorate Parliament on 27 January 1659.

After the reinstatement of the Rump Parliament (7 May 1659) and the subsequent abolition of the position of Lord Protector, the role of the Council of State along with other interregnum institutions becomes confused as the instruments of state started to implode. The Council of State was not dissolved until 28 May 1660, when King Charles II personally assumed the government in London.

== Lord President of the Council of State ==
The role of the President of the Council of State (usually addressed as "Lord President") was intended to simply preside over the Council of State.

John Bradshaw, the first president, served in the office for two years and ten months total. After Bradshaw, the Parliament passed a resolution on 26 November 1651 stating that "That no Person of any Committee of Parliament, or of the Council of State, shall be in the Chair of that Committee, or Council, for any longer Time, at once, than one Month" (Commons Journal, 7:43–44). This rotating presidency lasted until December 1653, when Henry Lawrence was, by order of Cromwell, dated 16 December 1653, made permanent chairman, with the title "Lord President of the Council". He would thereafter serve longer than any other president, serving for five-and-a-half years, until the dissolution of the Council as the Protectorate was collapsing. Even during the Protectorate of Oliver and Richard Cromwell, the position of Lord President of the Council of State, known during this period as the Protector's Privy Council, remained in existence until the re-establishment of the monarchy in 1660.

Start	End	Name	Note
17 February 1649	12 March 1649	vacancy	Pro tempore Oliver Cromwell
12 March 1649	29 December 1651	John Bradshaw	
29 December 1651	26 January 1652	Bulstrode Whitelocke	
26 January 1652	23 February 1652	Sir Arthur Haselrig	
23 February 1652	22 March 1652	Philip Sidney, Lord Lisle	
22 March 1652	19 April 1652	John Lisle	
19 April 1652	17 May 1652	Henry Rolle	
17 May 1652	14 June 1652	Sir Henry Vane the Younger	
14 June 1652	12 July 1652	Philip Herbert, Earl of Pembroke	
12 July 1652	9 August 1652	Denis Bond	
9 August 1652	7 September 1652	William Purefoy	
7 September 1652	5 October 1652	Sir James Harrington	
5 October 1652	25 October 1652	Sir William Constable	
25 October 1652	22 November 1652	Sir William Masham	
22 November 1652	1 December 1652	Sir William Constable	
1 December 1652	29 December 1652		unknown
29 December 1652	26 January 1653	Henry Rolle	
26 January 1653	23 February 1653	John Bradshaw	
23 February 1653	23 March 1653	Thomas Chaloner	
23 March 1653	20 April 1653	Denis Bond	
20 April 1653	29 April 1653		Dissolved along with the Rump Parliament by Cromwell with the support of the Army Council
30 April 1653	6 May 1653	John Lambert	Reconstituted with thirteen members of whom nine were Army officers. (Note: The thirteen members were Captain-General Oliver Cromwell; Major-Generals John Lambert, Thomas Harrison, John Desborough and Matthew Thomlinson; Colonels Anthony Stapley, Robert Bennet, William Sydenham and Philip Jones; and four civilians, Walter Strickland, Sir Gilbert Pickering, John Carew and Samuel Moyer. (Jenkins 1890, p. 67))
6 May 1653	13 May 1653	Sir Gilbert Pickering	
13 May 1653	27 May 1653		unknown
27 May 1653	10 June 1653	John Desborough	
10 June 1653	24 June 1653	unknown	
24 June 1653	5 July 1653	Philip Jones of Fonmon	Welsh
8 July 1653	21 July 1653	Sir Gilbert Pickering	
21 July 1653	4 August 1653	Edward Montagu	
4 August 1653	17 August 1653		unknown
17 August 1653	31 August 1653	Sir Anthony Ashley Cooper	
31 August 1653	14 September 1653	Robert Tichborne	
14 September 1653	28 September 1653		unknown
28 September 1653	14 October 1653	Charles Howard	
4 October 1653	3 November 1653	Samuel Moyer	acting
14 October 1653	3 November 1653	Samuel Moyer	
3 November 1653	6 December 1653	Edward Montagu	
6 December 1653	12 December 1653	Walter Strickland	
December 1653	6 May 1659	Henry Lawrence	During the Protectorate
7 May 1659	18 May 1659		Replaced by a Committee of Safety
19 May 1659	25 October 1659	Josiah Berners (or Barnes)	Members of the Council known to serve as president during most of 1659 the first year of the second period of the Commonwealth, which started in May when the Protectorate of Richard Cromwell came to an end. (Note: The presidents of the council during this period are listed in alphabetic order—as is done by the source (Schultz 2010)—not in the chronological order of the rest of the list.)
19 May 1659	25 October 1659	Sir James Harrington,	Members of the Council known to serve as president during most of 1659 the first year of the second period of the Commonwealth, which started in May when the Protectorate of Richard Cromwell came to an end.
19 May 1659	25 October 1659	Sir Arthur Haselrig	Members of the Council known to serve as president during most of 1659 the first year of the second period of the Commonwealth, which started in May when the Protectorate of Richard Cromwell came to an end.
19 May 1659	25 October 1659	Archibald Johnston, Lord Warriston (Scot)	Members of the Council known to serve as president during most of 1659 the first year of the second period of the Commonwealth, which started in May when the Protectorate of Richard Cromwell came to an end.
19 May 1659	25 October 1659	Richard Salwey	Members of the Council known to serve as president during most of 1659 the first year of the second period of the Commonwealth, which started in May when the Protectorate of Richard Cromwell came to an end.
19 May 1659	25 October 1659	Thomas Scot	Members of the Council known to serve as president during most of 1659 the first year of the second period of the Commonwealth, which started in May when the Protectorate of Richard Cromwell came to an end.
19 May 1659	25 October 1659	Sir Henry Vane the Younger	Members of the Council known to serve as president during most of 1659 the first year of the second period of the Commonwealth, which started in May when the Protectorate of Richard Cromwell came to an end.
19 May 1659	25 October 1659	Bulstrode Whitelocke	Members of the Council known to serve as president during most of 1659 the first year of the second period of the Commonwealth, which started in May when the Protectorate of Richard Cromwell came to an end.
26 October	Late December		Replaced by another Committee of Safety
30 December 1659	23 February 1660		unknown
23 February 1660	28 May 1660	Arthur Annesley	Anglo-Irish

== Sources ==
- Emerich, John; Acton, Lord Edward Dalberg, eds. (1934), The Cambridge Modern History, vol. 5, CUP Archive, p. 437
- Hume, David (1983) [1778], "Chapter: LX: The Commonwealth: Endnote [a]", The History of England from the Invasion of Julius Caesar to the Revolution in 1688, Foreword by William B. Todd, 6 vols., vol. 6, Indianapolis: Liberty Fund
- Jenkins, Edward (1890), The Constitutional Experiments of the Commonwealth: A study of the Years 1649–1660, Cambridge Historical Essays, vol. III, CUP Archive, p. 67
- Schultz, Oleg, ed. (13 March 2010), "Commonwealth of England: Council of State: 1649–1660", Archontology, archived from the original on 16 July 2012
- Tanner, Joseph Robson (1928), English Constitutional Conflicts of the Seventeenth Century, 1603–1689 (reprint ed.), CUP Archive, p. 168, ISBN 9780521065986
