= Matthew Thomlinson =

English soldier (1617–1681)

Matthew Thomlinson (1617–1681) was an English soldier who fought for Parliament in the English Civil War. He was a regicide of Charles I. Tomlinson was a colonel of horse (cavalry) in the New Model Army and was one of the officers presenting the remonstrance to parliament in 1647. He took charge of Charles I in 1648, until Charles's execution, but refused to be his judge. He followed Oliver Cromwell to Scotland in 1650.

On Cromwell's dissolution of the Rump Parliament, Tomlinson was chosen as one of the members of the Council of State that succeeded it, and of the Barebones Parliament. Sent to Ireland to join the government there, he was knighted by Henry Cromwell who, nevertheless, distrusted him; in 1658 he was recalled to London as one of Ireland's representatives in Oliver Cromwell's new House of Peers. He was impeached by the parliamentary party in 1660 but escaped punishment at the restoration of the monarchy.

== Biography ==
Thomlinson, baptised 24 September 1617, was the second son of John Thomlinson of York and Eleanor, daughter of Matthew Dodsworth.

Thomlinson was one of the gentlemen of the Inns of Court who enlisted to form the lifeguard of Robert, Earl of Essex in 1642. On 25 March 1645, Whitelocke mentions the defeat of a party of the garrison of Wallingford by Captain Thomlinson and a detachment from Abingdon. In the New Model Army he held the rank of major in Sir Robert Pye's regiment of horse, becoming colonel of that regiment in the summer of 1647.

During the quarrel between the army and the Long Parliament, he adhered to the former and was one of the officers presenting the remonstrance of the army (25 June 1647) to Parliament. On 23 December 1648, the Army Council ordered him to take charge of the King, then at Windsor, and Charles remained in his custody at St. James's during the trial, and up to the day of his execution. Thomlinson then delivered Charles up to Colonel Hacker, the bearer of the death warrant, but, at the King's request, accompanied him as far as the entrance to the scaffold. Charles gave him a gold toothpick and case as a legacy. Thomlinson had been appointed by the Rump Parliament as one of the King's Judges, but had declined to sit in the court.

In 1650, Thomlinson and his regiment followed Oliver Cromwell to Scotland. On 17 January 1652, he was appointed one of the committee for the reformation of the law. On Cromwell's dissolution of the Rump Parliament in April 1653 he was one of the members of the Council of State chosen by the Council of Officers of the army, and on 5 July 1653 he was also co-opted to sit in the Barebones Parliament.

During the greater part of the Protectorate, Thomlinson was employed in Ireland as one of the council first of Charles Fleetwood (27 August 1654) and afterwards of Henry Cromwell (16 November 1657). On 11 December 1654, when the officers of the English occupation army in Ireland made their agreement with Dr. (afterwards Sir) William Petty for the survey of Ireland, there was "a solemn seeking of God, performed by Colonel Thomlinson, for a blessing upon the conclusion of so great a business". Henry Cromwell found him rather a thorn in his side, and, in spite of his "sly carriage", suspected him of stirring up disaffection against his government and of secret intrigues with the republican opposition. Nevertheless, Henry Cromwell, when he became Lord Deputy, selected Thomlinson for knighthood (24 November 1657), in order to show his willingness to be reconciled to old opponents; nor did he hesitate to give him a commendatory letter when he went to England. The Protector summoned Thomlinson to sit in his House of Lords, but his employment detained him in Ireland.

On 7 July 1659, the restored Rump Parliament made Thomlinson one of the five commissioners for the civil government of Ireland. In the quarrel which followed between Parliament and the army he was suspected of too great an inclination to the cause of the latter, and was consequently arrested (13 December 1659) and impeached (19 January 1660) by the supporters of the parliamentary party. The impeachment, however, was not proceeded with, and when Thomlinson arrived in England he was permitted to remain at liberty on giving his engagement not to disturb the existing government.

At the restoration of the monarchy Thomlinson was excepted by name from the order for the arrest of the King's judges and the seizure of their estates (17 May 1660). In his petition to the House of Lords, he stated that he had never taken part in the proceedings against Charles I (though his name had been mistakenly inserted among those who sat and gave judgement). He pleaded also that the King had specially recommended him to his son for his civility, and, as this was confirmed by the evidence of Henry Seymour, the Lords agreed with the Commons to free him from any penalty. Charles II and some royalists argued that Thomlinson ought to have allowed the King to escape, and grudgingly gave Thomlinson his impunity.

At the trial of the regicides, Thomlinson bore evidence against Colonel Hacker, but most of his testimony was directed to his own vindication. He lost by the Restoration Ampthill Park, which he had acquired during the Commonwealth. He died on 3 November 1681, and was buried in the church of East Malling, near Maidstone.

== Family ==
Thomlinson married Pembroke, daughter of Sir William Brooke, with whom he had two daughters:

- Jane, who married Philip Owen, and died in 1703;
- Elizabeth, died unmarried.

His widow died on 10 June 1683, and was buried in East Malling church. Thomlinson's sister Jane was the wife of Sir Thomas Twisden, who, ironically, presided as a judge at the trial of several of Matthew's fellow regicides.
