= John Fowke =

English merchant and politician

John Fowke (c. 1596 – 22 April 1662) was an English merchant and politician. He served as a Sheriff of London for 1644 and Lord Mayor of London for 1652.

He was the Member of Parliament for City of London in 1661–1662.

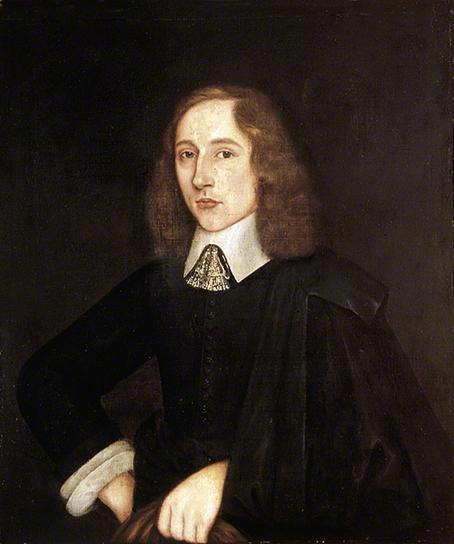
John Fowke.

== Early life ==
He was the third son of William Fowke of Tewkesbury, Gloucestershire, by his wife, Alice Carr of Newcastle-under-Lyme, Staffordshire. Coming to London, he rose to be one of its leading merchants. He was a member of the Haberdashers' Company, and an alderman.

== Conflict with the king ==
In 1627 Fowke, after the vote and declaration of the House of Commons against paying tonnage and poundage, persistently refused to pay. He had goods seized to the value of £5,827. In August 1627 and January 1628, for attempting to obtain legal redress, he was imprisoned and lost more merchandise. In the following February he was prosecuted by the Star Chamber for 'pretended riot and seditious words' used by him to the officers sent to execute the replevin. About the same time Charles I expressed displeasure against Fowke, and shortly afterwards named him in a declaration printed and published in March 1628.

In October 1629, on Fowke again refusing to pay the impost, an information was laid against him at the council, and 'great endeavours used to take away his life and estate upon false pretences of clipping of money and piracies.' After witnesses had been examined he was committed to the Fleet Prison and his ship and cargo, with a prize of sugar, seized. He was forced to give £40,000.

In June 1641 he petitioned the Commons for relief for his losses. The House, by an order of 30 June 1645, nominated a committee to consider how he might have reparation out of delinquents' estates.

== Civil War years ==
Fowke served the office of sheriff in 1643. King Charles, in his answer to the city petition of 4 January 1643, spoke of Fowke as one of the leaders of the parliamentary party in the city, and a person 'notoriously guilty of schism and high treason'. In the ordinance of 29 March 1643 of parliament for raising money, Fowke was one of the persons empowered to nominate collectors in each ward.

Having been appointed a commissioner of the customs, and refusing to deliver up an account on oath of what money he had received, he was fined by the committee of accompts, 18 April 1645, and in the end sent to the Fleet Prison. A deputation from the common council, headed by his friend William Gibbs, goldsmith, then sheriff, petitioned the Commons on 23 July for his release on bail. After a long debate on 4 August it was resolved that Fowke ought to 'accompt jointly with the rest of the late commissioners and collectors of the customs.'

He was treated on all sides with deference. Under two decrees made by Lord Keeper Coventry, on 21 November 1631 and 9 June 1635, the East India Company had retained money of Fowke's. He petitioned the Lords, 8 July 1646, to have these decrees reversed. On 6 May 1647 judgment was given in his favour, with costs.

== After the First Civil War: the parliament-army struggle ==
At a meeting of the common council for nominating a new committee for the militia of London, 27 April 1647, Fowke's name was ordered to be omitted from the list to be presented to parliament. However, on the following 12 June, upon a rumour of the army's near approach to London, he was asked to head a deputation to parliament to desire its approbation of the city's answer to Thomas Fairfax, and early next morning he set out with his fellow-commissioners to carry it to the general at St. Albans. He was restored to the militia committee by an ordinance of both houses dated 23 July and 2 September 1647.

On 12 July 1648 Fowke presented to both houses a petition for peace, and delivered a short speech. The petition, which with the speech was published, expressed a hope that the parliament might take a course to secure peace. When a few weeks later the army returned to London, according to Denzil Holles, Fowke and Gibbs kept the city calm.

== Under the Commonwealth ==
At the sale of bishops' lands Fowke acquired, on 28 September 1648, the Gloucestershire manors of Maysmore, Preston, Longford, and Ashleworth, the property of the sees of Gloucester and Bristol. He was named one of the king's judges, but refused to attend the trial.

On 27 February 1651 a parliamentary committee reported that compensation to the extent of £27,615 ought to be awarded him. The matter was referred to a committee of the council of state, 9 September 1652, who suggested that state lands in Waltham Forest, Essex, worth £500 a year should be settled on him and his heirs for ever. This proposal received the assent of the council on 9 May 1654. Fowke then asked them to take his 'sufferings' into consideration. Finally, it was enacted, 4 August 1654, that £5,000 be assigned him from the fines set by the Act of Grace for Scotland.

During 1652–3 Fowke served the office of lord mayor. In January 1653 he was acting as a commissioner for the sale of the king's goods. Along with four other commissioners he was appointed, 10 March 1654, to consider 'how the business of the forests might be best improved for the benefit of the state,' and to draw up a report.

== The Restoration ==
He was one of the committee chosen by the City of London to confer with Charles Fleetwood, 9 December 1659. Three weeks later he laid before the court of common council a report, which was printed, on the 'imminent and extraordinary danger of the City.' When the city corporation agreed to send their thanks to George Monck for his services, Fowke was one of the three commissioners appointed for that purpose, 19 January 1660. In March he appears as a commissioner for the City of London militia.

When the Restoration seemed inevitable, Fowke issued an advertisement denying that he was 'one of those persons that did actually sit as judges upon the tryal,' to which he appended a certificate from Henry Scobell, clerk of the parliament, dated 28 March 1660. For a while he appears to have lived in retirement at his country seat at Clayberry, situated to the north-east of Barking, near Woodford Bridge, Essex. He was, however, elected M.P. for the city of London on 19 March 1661, when he headed the poll. He was chosen in the same year president of Christ's Hospital, to which and Bethlehem Hospital he proved a liberal benefactor. He died of apoplexy on 22 April 1662.

== Legacy ==
He bequeathed to Christ's Hospital estates in Essex for the maintenance of eight boys, of whom two were to be of the parish of Barking and two of Woodford. Under this bequest Clayberry was sold by his trustees in 1693. Fowke's portrait, dated 1691, is at Christ's Hospital.

== Family ==
By his wife Catherine, daughter of Richard Briggs of London, he had two sons, John and Bartholomew, and a daughter, Elizabeth.

== See also ==
- List of Lord Mayors of London
- List of Sheriffs of London

Civic offices
Preceded by John Kendrick	Lord Mayor of the City of London; 1652	Succeeded by Thomas Vyner
