= William Thompson (1614–1681) =

English businessman and politician

Sir William Thompson (10 April 1614 – c. April 1681) of London was an English businessman and politician. He was the Member of Parliament for the City of London from 19 March 1661 to 1679.

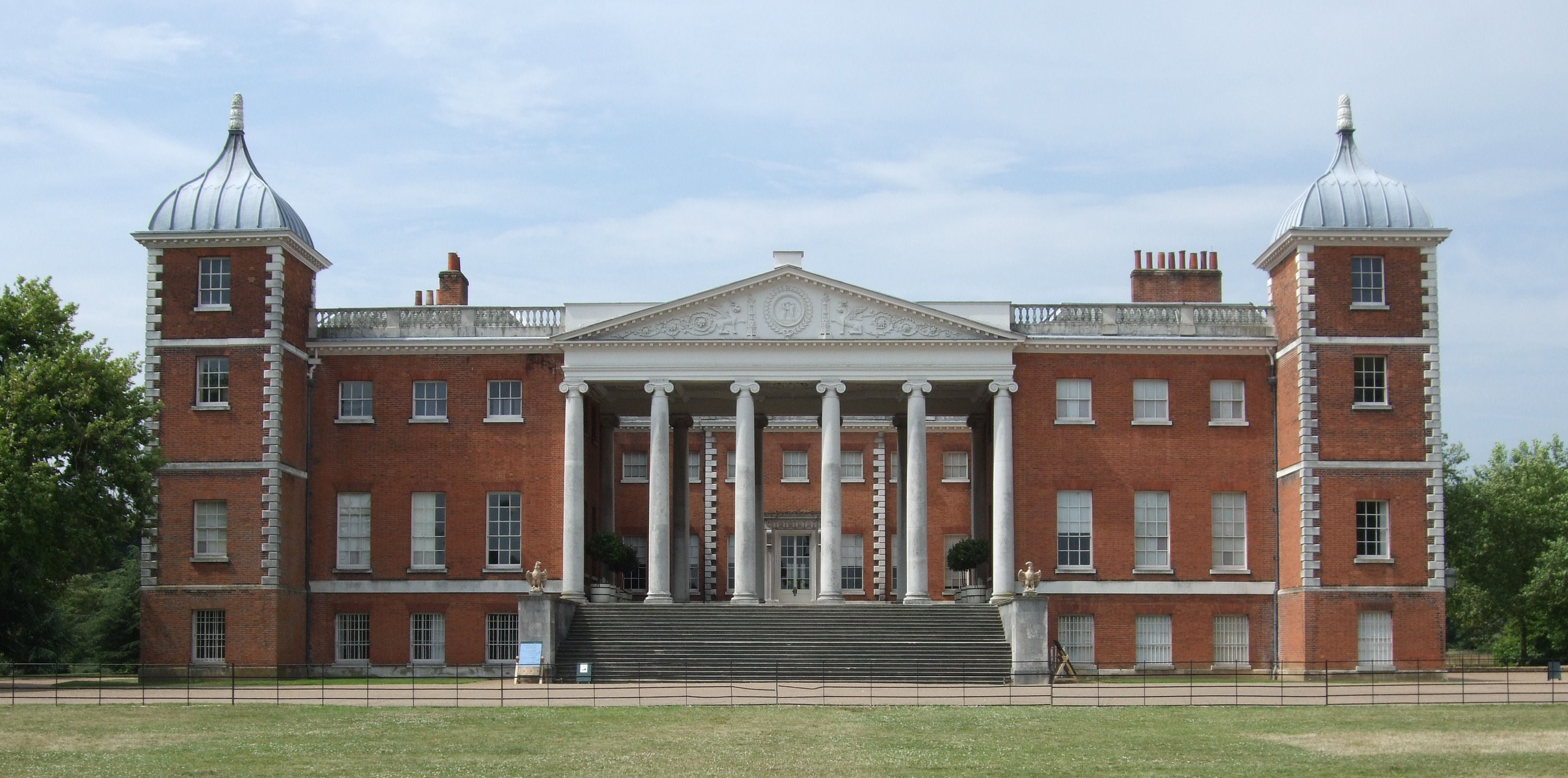
Osterley Park House today

He was born the youngest of the four sons of Robert Thompson of Cheshunt, Hertfordshire and educated at Merchant Taylors' School. All four brothers, which included Maurice and George, became successful businessmen in London. A committed Parliamentarian, he was second-in-command at the First Battle of Newbury. He rose to prominence in the East India Company as a major stockholder and Governor, becoming a London alderman and sheriff.

He served as a Member of Parliament for the City of London in 1659 and was knighted in The Hague by King Charles II in 1660.

He was re-elected MP for London in 1661, sitting until 1679. During this time he bought Osterley Park, now in north London.

He died in 1681. He had married Elizabeth, the daughter and heiress of Samuel Warner, Grocer, of London, with whom he had a surviving son and a daughter. The son, Samuel, also became a London alderman and was knighted by James II.
