= Praise-God Barebone =

English radical Puritan preacher (c. 1598–1679)

Praise-God Barebone/Barbon
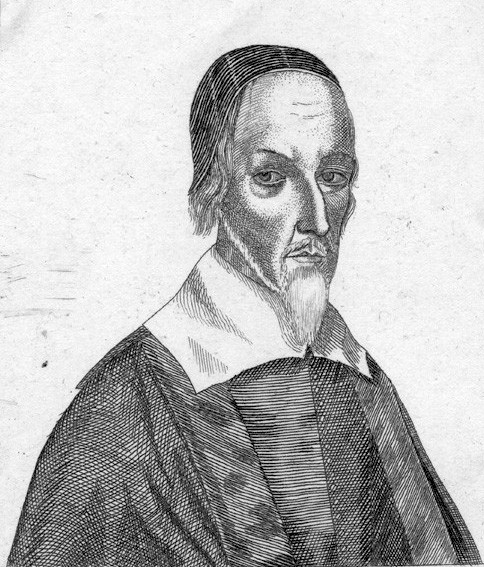

Member of Parliament in Barebone's Parliament

Personal details
- Born: c. 1598
- Died: 1679
- Profession: Preacher, leather-seller

Praise-God Barebone (sometimes spelled Barbon) (c. 1598–1679) was an English leather-seller, preacher, and Fifth Monarchist. He is best known for giving his name to the Barebone's Parliament of the English Commonwealth of 1653.

== Early life ==
Little is known of Barebone's early life. Writing in 2001, Nicholas Tyacke speculated that he may have been the son of John Barebone, rector of Charwelton in Northamptonshire, by his marriage to Mary Roper of Daventry, and that he may have had an older brother called Fear-God (a minor poet) but this possibility lacks supporting evidence because the Charwelton parish register for that period has been lost.

The first that is known about him is that he became a freeman of the Leathersellers' Company in January 1623, having served an eight- or nine-year apprenticeship. He was elected a warden of the yeomanry of the leather-sellers in 1630, and a liveryman in 1634. In 1630 he married his wife Sarah, with whom he later had at least one son, Nicholas Barbon, an economist known as the father of fire insurance.

There is some confusion over the use of the hortatory name 'Unless-Jesus-Christ-Had-Died-For-Thee-Thou-Hadst-Been-Damned' in the Barebone family. One source claims this was Praise-God's baptismal name; others claim this was his brother's name; and more modern sources claim a variant on this name was given to his son Nicholas.

== Religion ==
By 1632, Barebone had joined the semi-separatist congregation founded in 1616 by Henry Jacob, later to be led by John Lothropp and then, from 1637, by Henry Jessey. By December 1641 he had begun preaching to audiences at his premises at the Lock and Key, at the lower end of Fleet Street near Fetter Lane. On 19 December of that year, his sermon against bishops and the Book of Common Prayer attracted hostile attention from apprentices, who smashed the premises' windows.

... he was preaching in his house to a hundred or a hundred and fifty people, "as many women as men", when a hostile crowd gathered outside and begun to break the windows. A constable came and arrested some of the separatists, but order was not fully restored until the lord mayor and sheriffs arrived.

Some of Barebone's congregation were taken to the Bridewell prison, others to the Counters, and still others made their escape over the roof-tops, while the crowd was left to destroy his shop-sign.

The following month more than fifty people, including many members or former members of Jessey's church, were rebaptised by immersion, in London. Barebone strongly disagreed with these advocates of believers' baptism, and within a few weeks he issued A Discourse Tending to Prove the Baptism ... to be the Ordinance of Jesus Christ. The claim that Barebone himself was an Anabaptist is likely to derive from post-Restoration critics. A second work, A Reply to the Frivolous and Impertinent Answer of RB, was published in the spring of 1643. In the next few years Barebone was involved in conflicts with those who controlled the vestry of St Dunstan-in-the-West, and with Francis Kemp, the lawyer who acted for them. Barebone later joined the sect known as the Fifth Monarchists, known for their millenarianism.

== Appointment to the Nominated Assembly ==
In July 1653 Barebone was appointed to sit as a representative of the City of London in the Nominated Assembly, a body set up after the expulsion of the Rump Parliament by Oliver Cromwell. The Assembly, whose members were chosen by Cromwell and the Army Council instead of being elected, soon became known as Barebone's Parliament to its many critics, Barebone proving a likely target due to his name and his apparently humble origins.

Barebone, who was never chosen to sit in the Assembly's Council of State, was an active member. He sat on a committee on tithes set up on 19 July 1653, and he was also one of the first members of the committee established on 19 August to consider law reform. In late July he was tasked with placating large numbers of women who were demonstrating at Westminster in support of John Lilburne.

== Later career ==
Barebone was elected to the Common Council of the City of London for the year 1657 and re-elected until 1660. After the restoration of the Rump Parliament, he was nominated to the London militia committee under the Act of 7 July 1659. In 1660, Barebone endeavoured to prevent the Restoration of the English monarchy. He published Marchamont Needham's book News from Brussels in a Letter from a Near Attendant on His Majesty's Person..., which related unfavourable anecdotes about the prospective king of England, Charles II. Along with other "well-affected citizens" in London, he also presented an address to the Rump Parliament in February 1660 urging that they "use all possible Endeavours to prevent the Commonwealth's Adversaries in this their most dangerous Stratagem" and subsequently received the thanks of the House.

When the same Parliament had its excluded members of 1648 readmitted, paving the way for the Restoration, celebratory bonfires were lit in London by young apprentices, and Barebone "had but little thanks of the boyes, for they broke all his glass windows that belonged to the front of his house". In July 1660, following the Restoration, a royalist tract called The Picture of the Good Old Cause Drawn to the Life reprinted a petition he had made in February calling for Members of Parliament to deny rule by Charles II or any other single person.

As a result of these views, he was arrested on 25 November 1661 and charged with treason alongside James Harrington and Samuel Moyer. He was then imprisoned in the Tower of London. He was freed on 27 July 1662 after a petition from his wife pleading his illness. In 1666, his premises were one of the most westerly buildings to be engulfed in the Great Fire of London. Barebone died at the end of 1679 and was buried on 5 January 1680 in the parish of St Andrew Holborn.

== Works ==
- A Discourse tending to prove ... Baptism ... to be the ordinance of Jesus Christ. As also that the Baptism of Infants is warentable. 1642. The preface indicates Barebone's religious tolerance.
- A Reply to the Frivolous and Impertinent answer of R.B. and E.B. to the Discourse of P.B.. 1643.
- Good Things to Come. 1675. In this Barebone looked forward to the imminent arrival of Jesus Christ: "his kingdom and reign shall be outward, and visible on earth... when he shall come the second time, in power and great glory" (p. 10).

== Family ==
His eldest son was the economist Nicholas Barbon.
