= Barebone's Parliament =

English parliament, July to December 1653

Barebone's Parliament, also known as the Little Parliament, the Nominated Assembly and the Parliament of Saints, came into being on 4 July 1653, and was the last attempt of the English Commonwealth to find a stable political form before the installation of Oliver Cromwell as Lord Protector. It was an assembly entirely nominated by Oliver Cromwell and the Army's Council of Officers. It acquired its name from the nominee for the City of London, Praise-God Barebone. The Speaker of the House was Francis Rous. The total number of nominees was 140, 129 from England, five from Scotland and six from Ireland (see the list of MPs).

After conflict and infighting, on 12 December 1653, the members of the assembly voted to dissolve it. It was preceded by the Rump Parliament and succeeded by the First Protectorate Parliament.

== Need for a parliament ==
Oliver Cromwell

Following the execution of King Charles, the Rump Parliament was the last remaining element of the English government. It had little or no claim to representation of the populace and held elections only to replace members. The mood of the country was for long-needed reforms to be carried out but the Rump made little progress. The enactment of a Navigation Act to aid merchants led to the First Anglo-Dutch War in 1652. There was an expectation that a new parliament should be called; however, the Rump made no moves towards its dissolution.

== Debate over form of assembly ==
The forced dissolution of the Rump Parliament on 20 April 1653 left a gap in the legislature, with no blueprint to fill it. Cromwell and the Council of Officers claimed to be "led by necessity and Providence to act as we have done, even beyond and above our own thoughts and desires, so we shall ... put ourselves wholly upon the Lord for a blessing".

On 29 April, Cromwell set up a small Council of State of thirteen members, responsible for foreign policy and administration of the country. (Note: The members were Lambert, Harrison, Cromwell, Desborough, Strickland, Pickering, Sydenham, Carew, Stapley, Bennett, Tomlinson, Jones, and Moyer.) The Council of Officers remained responsible for decisions about the new form of government. John Lambert argued in favour of lodging power in the hands of ten or twelve men. Thomas Harrison, drawing on his Fifth Monarchist beliefs, argued that their duty was to accelerate the coming of the kingdom of Christ by putting power into the hands of godly men. Another Fifth Monarchist, John Rogers, proposed the idea of an assembly numbering 70 based on the Jewish Sanhedrin. The Council of Officers settled on an assembly of 140 representatives, double the Sanhedrin model, which may signify a practical compromise to emulate the Sanhedrin while accommodating members from across England, Wales, Scotland and Ireland. The Scottish and Irish delegates were English soldiers serving in those countries.

The Council of Officers then settled the question of how to select the group's representatives, agreeing that members should be chosen by the council, all of whom were free to put forward nominations. Power would be vested in each member by Cromwell in his role as commander-in-chief of the army. Although there was negative reaction from some churches, with a member of a congregation in London declaring "the question is not so much now who is Independent, Anabaptist, etc., as who is for Christ and who is for Cromwell", most of the sects welcomed the decision. S. R. Gardiner conjectured that the Council of Officers consulted congregational churches in each county, asking them to send names of suitable candidates for the new assembly. However, no copy of any letter of consultation survives, and although some churches did send in nominations, there is no evidence that a mass consultation took place. By 3 May the Council of Officers had had over a hundred names submitted by its members. By 23 May an initial list of nominations was ready, which was then added to and refined over the next few weeks.

== Inauguration ==
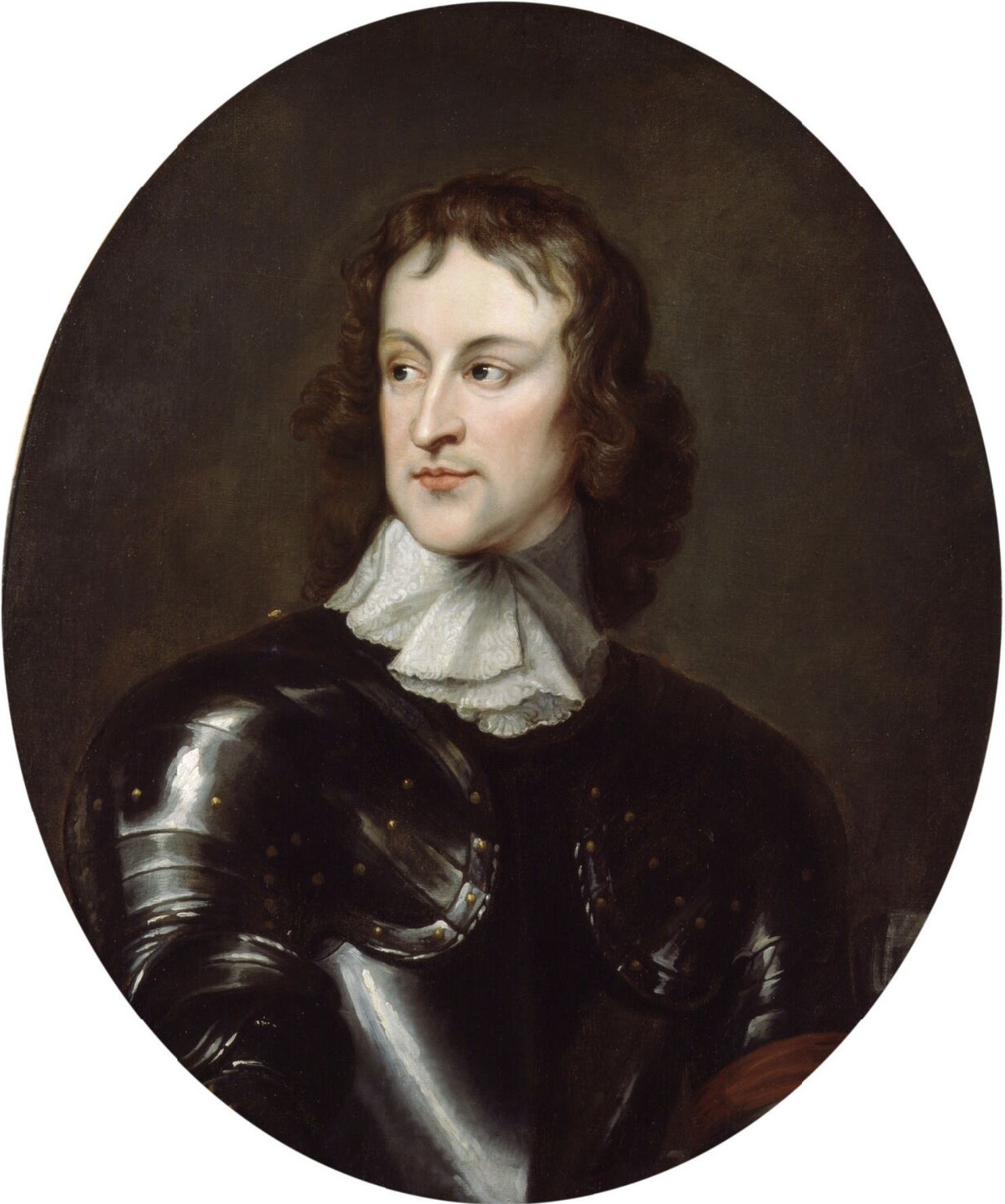
John Lambert

The assembly met for the first time on 4 July in the council chamber at Whitehall. Cromwell opened proceedings with a speech around two hours long. He began by summing up the "series of Providences" that had brought them to this point, starting with the Short Parliament and singling out 1648 as the "most memorable year that ever this nation saw". In a much-analysed passage, Cromwell is supposed to have declared: "God doth manifest it to be the day of the Power of Jesus Christ". This has sometimes been adduced as evidence that Cromwell shared Harrison's Fifth Monarchist beliefs, welcoming the assembly as the start of Christ's kingdom on earth. However, the first published version of the speech records this sentence as "God doth manifest it to be a day of the Power of Jesus Christ", considerably softening the impact, and implying that he merely thought it to be a spiritually joyful occasion. (Note: See discussion and particularly (Woolrych 1982, pp. 148–149, n. 17)) Cromwell then asked a written 'instrument' to be read out, drawn up by the Council of Officers and investing power in the assembly.

The assembly then adjourned before sitting in full on the following day. On that day they elected Francis Rous, initially as chairman (he was not known as Speaker until a month later). Henry Scobell was appointed as Clerk. Cromwell and four other officers – Lambert, John Desborough, Harrison and Matthew Tomlinson – were then co-opted as members. On 12 July, the assembly published a declaration declaring itself to be the parliament of the Commonwealth of England. This was the first time that it had been formally described as a parliament.

== Membership ==
The parliament became a subject of ridicule very quickly after its establishment. A newswriter called them "Pettifoggers, Innkeepers, Millwrights, Stockingmongers and such a rabble as never had hopes to be of a Grand Jury". In particular, its members were singled out for their alleged low social status, their puritanism and their relative lack of political experience. These criticisms were seen to be encapsulated by one of its members, Praise-God Barebone, a leather seller, Fifth Monarchist and lay preacher from Fleet Street in London. Before its dissolution the assembly had become known as Barebone's Parliament.

Despite contemporary slanders, the assembly's members were mainly drawn from the richest five per cent of the population, and few tradesmen were represented. Nor was it solely composed of Fifth Monarchists, despite the impression that hostile contemporary pamphlets give. Twelve or thirteen members can be identified as Fifth Monarchists, some of whom had served with Harrison. These were contrasted with about fifteen of the more active members of the assembly, who were more moderate Independents. Although it is misleading to divide the assembly into two parties, an analysis of its entire membership along moderate and radical lines identifies 76 members as religious moderates and 47 as radicals, with a further 21 either impossible to identify or not participating in the assembly.

Only four regicides, Anthony Stapley, John Carew, Thomas Harrison, and Cromwell himself, were appointed. Thomas Harrison was the leader of the Fifth Monarchists and John Carew was also a Fifth Monarchist.

== The rise of conflict ==
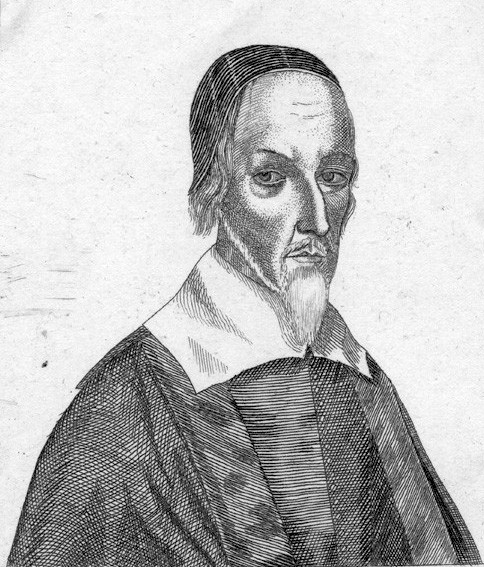
Praise-God Barebone

On 13 July, the assembly began debating tithes – which were objected to by many sects on the grounds that they were a remnant of Catholicism, that they supported a professional rather than voluntary clergy, and that their economic burden fell unequally. There was general agreement that tithes were objectionable, but little agreement about what mechanism for generating revenue should replace them. Debate within the assembly was quickly echoed by petitions from churches around the country. Another contentious issue the assembly debated during its early weeks was the trial of John Lilburne, which again did little to unite opinion. A third issue, reform of the legal system, again split the members, with Fifth Monarchists arguing that only laws contained in scripture should be reflected in the temporal legal system, while former members of the Rump's Hale Commission pushed for progressive reform.

By early September, Cromwell was already said to have been growing frustrated with the assembly's in-fighting between different groups. A newswriter reported him saying to a confidant that he was "more troubled now with the fool than before now with the knave". He also wrote to his son-in-law Charles Fleetwood complaining that the members "being of different judgements, and of each sort most seeking to propagate their own, that spirit of kindness that is to them, is hardly accepted of any". Attendance also began to fall. Over one hundred members were present at most votes in July, dropping to an average turnout of 70 by October. Various bills inflamed conflict between the radical and moderate members – bills to abolish the Court of Chancery, regulate legal fees, and speed up settlement of cases in the Court of Admiralty all became bogged down in conflict. At this point, however, radical members were still mainly outnumbered in votes by moderate and conservative members.

== Dissolution and aftermath ==
This changed during November and December when debate returned to the question of tithes. On 6 December the committee of the assembly appointed to consider the question presented their report, covering the question of how unfit ministers were to be ejected, naming commissioners who would have the job of enacting this, and retaining support for tithes in prescribed circumstances. The first clause of the report was voted against by 56 votes to 54 in a defeat for the moderates. Two days later, moderates came to the House and demanded that the assembly abdicate its powers, criticising radical members for threatening the wellbeing of the Commonwealth by fomenting disagreement. Rous and around 40 members walked out and went to Cromwell at Whitehall, presenting a document signed by nearly 80 members that declared: "Upon a Motion this day made in the House, that the sitting of this Parliament any longer as now constituted, will not be for the good of the Commonwealth". Those left in the house were soon confronted by troops requesting that they leave.

The collapse of the radical consensus which had spawned the Nominated Assembly led to the Grandees passing the Instrument of Government in the Council of State which paved the way for Cromwell's Protectorate.

== See also ==
- List of MPs nominated to the English parliament in 1653
