= Robert Tichborne =

English merchant, politician, author and military officer

Sir Robert Tichborne
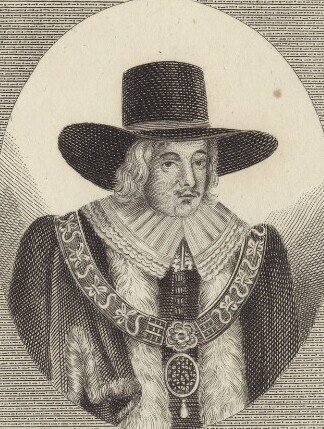
- Engraving of Tichborne

Sheriff of the City of London
- In office 1651–1651 Serving with Richard Chiverton

Lord Mayor of London
- In office October 1656 – October 1657
- Preceded by: John Dethick
- Succeeded by: Richard Chiverton

Personal details
- Born: c. 1604
- Died: 1682 Tower of London
- Known for: Regicide of Charles I

Sir Robert Tichborne (c. 1604 – c. 1682) was an English merchant, politician, author and military officer who served as Lord Mayor of London in 1656. He was a regicide of Charles I.

Before the English Civil War, he was a linen-draper by trade. In 1643 he was a captain in the London trained bands. He was Lieutenant of the Tower of London in 1647. Tichborne was an extreme republican and independent who signed Charles I's death-warrant. He was appointed as a commissioner to settle government of Scotland in 1651, following the Tender of Union. He sat for London in the Little parliament and in Cromwell's House of Lords. He was knighted in 1655, and made lord mayor of London in 1656.

Tichborne was one of the conservators of liberty set up by the New Model Army in 1659. He was sentenced to death after the Stuart Restoration, and imprisoned for life in the Tower of London. Tichborne was also the author of two religious works. Burke's Peerage, page 1436. Berry, Genealogies of Hants, Page 28. Berry, Genealogies of Kent, page 361. Visitation of London, Vol. 2, page 289.

== Early life and origins ==
Robert Tichborne (1599–1682) was related to the Tichbornes of Tichborne, near Winchester, Hants. The precise relation is not clear but both lines were descended from Sir John Tichborne (died 1498) Knight and Sheriff of Hampshire in 1488 and 1496, and (married c. 1465) Margaret Martin, daughter and heiress of Richard Martin of Edenbridge. The line for Chidiock Tichborne is also descended from this couple.

The Harleian MS 5800 in the British Library has a handwritten pedigree for the Tichbornes, written 1658 for Robert Tichborne just after he had been Lord Mayor of London (1656–57) and for his elevation to the Lords by Cromwell. Robert's coat of arms uses the Tichborne coat (vair a chief or) but with a crescent for difference, denoting a second son.

The descent is not clear for the first two generations – and does not fully match with other contemporary Tichborne genealogies. Working backwards and using additional sources as well, this gives Robert Tichborne's ancestry as:

1. son of Robert Tichborne (1567–) and Johanna Banckes, daughter of Thomas Banckes.(Visitation of London, 1633–4, ii. 289). This Robert's brother was Richard Tichborne of Crippenden, Cowden, Kent – a wealthy Iron Foundry owner.
2. who was second son of John Tichborne (after 1549–1620) of Cowden and Dorothy Chaloner (born 1542), daughter of Thomas Chaloner of Lyndfield and Alice Shirley, daughter of Sir Richard Shirley of Wiston. This John's brother Morris, married Jane Chaloner, sister of Dorothy.
3. who was son of John Tichborne (d. 1556) and Alice Wolffe of Ashington, possibly daughter of Edward Wolffe of manor of Ashinton, W Sussex)
4. who was second son of Maurice/Morris Tichborne (died before 1508) and Margaret Courthope (died 1533), daughter of William Courthope of Heath.

This Morris Tichborne was either a younger son of John Tichborne and Margaret Martin – or grandson, with two generations in quick succession, through Thomas Tichborne (born between 1470–1477). This remains a genealogical uncertainty.

Early in life Robert Tichborne (1599–1682) was a linen-draper in London "by the little Conduit in Cheapside". Burke's Peerage, page 1436. Berry, Genealogies of Hants, page 28. Berry, Genealogies of Kent, page 361. Visitation of London, Vol. 2, page 289.

== Civil war ==
On the outbreak of the English Civil War Tichborne took up arms for Parliament, and was in 1643 a captain in the Yellow Regiment of the London trained bands. In February of that year he was one of a deputation from the city who presented a petition to the House of Commons against the proposed treaty with the king. According to a contemporary critic, he did not distinguish himself as a soldier, and was indeed "fitter for a warm bed than to command a regiment"; but he was a colonel in 1647, and was appointed by Fairfax in August of that year lieutenant of the Tower. Tichborne's political views were advanced, as his speeches in the council of the army in 1647 prove; and in religion his printed works show that he was an extreme independent.

== Regicide ==
On 15 January 1649 Tichborne presented to the House of Commons a petition from London in favour of the execution of the king and the establishment of a republic. Tichborne was appointed one of the king's judges, signed the death-warrant, and attended every meeting of the court excepting two.

== Commonwealth ==
On 23 October 1651 parliament selected Tichborne as one of the eight commissioners to settle the government of Scotland and prepare the way for its union with England. On 14 May 1652 he received the thanks of the English Parliament for his services in Scotland. In 1650 he was one of the sheriffs of London.

== Protectorate ==
Tichborne was one of the representatives of London in the Little Parliament, and was a member of the two councils of state elected by it.

In 1651 Tichborne was a Sheriff of the City of London. He is recorded as 'Alderman Tichburne' in attendance at the Whitehall Conference in 1655, representing the interests of merchants in discussing the readmission of Jews into England. The merchants were broadly opposed to readmission.

In 1656, he was elected Lord Mayor of London. The Lord Protector Oliver Cromwell knighted him on 15 December 1655 and summoned him to his House of Lords in December 1657. On 17 April 1658 Tichborne, who was colonel of the Yellow Regiment and a member of the London Militia Committee, presented an address from the London trained bands to the Lord Protector (Mercurius Politicus, 15–22 April 1658).

An unflattering character of Tichborne was given in "A Second Narrative of the late Parliament", 1658.

== Second Commonwealth ==
After the fall of the house of Cromwell, Tichborne, who was never a member of the Long Parliament, became a person of less importance; but in October 1659, when the army under John Lambert expelled the parliament, he was appointed one of the committee of safety which the army set up, and he was also one of the twenty-one "conservators of liberty" named by them in December following. Edmund Ludlow wrathfully observes that he "had lately moved to set up Richard Cromwell again". The restoration of the Long Parliament at the end of the month put an end to his political career. On 20 April 1660 a warrant was issued for the arrest of Tichborne and Alderman John Ireton, who were regarded as the two pillars of the Good Old Cause in the City of London. They were released four days later on bail.

== Restoration ==
At the Restoration Tichborne surrendered in obedience to the king's proclamation (16 June), though he showed considerable vacillation, withdrawing himself from the custody of the sergeant-at-arms, and then giving himself up once more, and Royalist pamphlets exulted over his imprisonment.

== Trial ==
Tichborne was tried at the sessions house in the Old Bailey on 10 October 1660, and pleaded not guilty, but admitted the fact for which he was indicted, only asserting his ignorance and repentance. "It was my unhappiness to be called to so sad a work when I had so few years over my head; a person neither bred up in the laws, nor in parliaments where laws are made. ... Had I known that then which I do now, I would have chosen a red hot oven to have gone into as soon as that meeting". He was found guilty of high treason, the considerable property he had acquired during the civil war and the confiscation of the crown lands that he had purchased were sequestrated, and he was sentenced to death.

The sentence of death was not carried out immediately because under terms of the act of Indemnity Tichborne was one of the nineteen regicides who, having surrendered themselves, were, if condemned, not to be executed save by a special act of parliament. It was also alleged in his favour that he had saved the lives of various royalists during the late government. A bill for the trial of Tichborne and his companions passed the House of Commons in January 1662, but was dropped in the Lords after Tichborne had been brought to the bar of the upper house and heard in his defence.

== Life imprisonment ==
In July 1662 Tichborne was removed to Holy Island, where he fell very ill, and was on his wife's petition transferred to Dover Castle. His wife and children were allowed to live with him during his imprisonment at Dover. He remained a prisoner for the rest of his life, and died in the Tower of London in July 1682.

== Bibliography ==
Tichborne was the author of two religious works:

- A Cluster of Canaan's Grapes: being several experimented truths, 1649, 4to.
- The Rest of Faith, 1649, 4to.; this is dedicated to Cromwell.
