= John Ireton =

Lord Mayor of London in 1658

Sir John Ireton (1615 – 1689) was Lord Mayor of London in 1658 and brother of General Henry Ireton.

== Biography ==
John Ireton was knighted by Oliver Cromwell, and purchased the estate of Radcliffe-on-Soar, in Nottinghamshire from Colonel Hutchinson. In 1652 he was appointed a Sheriff of London and in 1658 elected Lord Mayor of London.

In 1660 at the Restoration, he was excluded from the Act of Indemnity, and for a time imprisoned in the Tower of London. An allusion to which circumstance is made by Pepys in his "Diary," under the date 1 December 1661. According to a letter in the State Papers, in 1662 he was removed to the Scilly Islands; but if this were so, he was shortly after liberated, for in a list of thirteen "fanatics" at East Sheen, in 1664, where "conventicles were innumerable," is the name of "John Ireton, Formerly Lord Mayor." in 1685 he was again imprisoned for seditious practices, and, dying in 1689, was buried in London at the church of St. Bartholomew-the-Less.
