= Sir Thomas Adams, 1st Baronet =

Lord Mayor of the City of London and Member of Parliament for the City of London

Sir Thomas Adams Bt
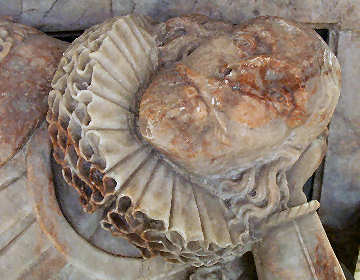
- Effigy from the tomb of Sir Thomas Adams

Member of Parliament for the City of London
- In office 1654–1658

Lord Mayor of the City of London
- In office October 1645 – October 1646
- Preceded by: Thomas Atkins
- Succeeded by: John Gayer

Personal details
- Born: 1586 Wem, Shropshire, England
- Died: 24 February 1667/1668
- Resting place: Sprowston, Norfolk, England
- Children: Richard Adams
- Education: Shrewsbury School
- Alma mater: Cambridge University
- Occupation: Draper, alderman

Sir Thomas Adams, 1st Baronet (1586 – 24 February 1667/1668) was the Lord Mayor of the City of London and a Member of Parliament for the City of London from 1654 to 1655 and from 1656 to 1658.

Adams was born in 1586, at Wem, Shropshire, educated at Shrewsbury School and admitted as a sizar to Sidney Sussex College, Cambridge University in 1600. He received his BA in 1605–6, and became a draper in London.

== Civic career ==
In 1640, he was elected as sheriff, giving up his business, and applying himself to public affairs. He then served as Master of the Drapers' Company, sat as an alderman on the City of London Corporation, and was president of St Thomas' Hospital, which he probably saved from ruin, by discovering the frauds of a dishonest steward. In 1642 he became Colonel of the Blue Regiment, London Trained Bands. In 1645, he was elected 309th Lord Mayor of the City of London, showing unusual disinterestedness, declining the financial advantages usually made by the sale of places which become vacant.

His loyalty to Charles I was so well known that at the start of the English Civil War his house was searched by parliamentary supporters, hoping to find the king there. The next year he was committed to the Tower, and detained for some time. However, at length he became the oldest alderman upon the bench, and was consequently dignified with the honourable title of father of the city. Sir Thomas sat as an MP for London from 1654 to 1655 and 1656–1658.

His affection for the king was such that during the exile of Charles II, he remitted him £10,000. On the restoration of the King Sir Thomas, then 74 years of age, was deputed by the city to accompany General Monck to Breda in the Netherlands, to accompany the king home. For his services the king knighted him at The Hague; and soon after the restoration advanced him to the dignity of a baronet, on 13 June 1661.

== Later life ==
In his latter years he was afflicted with kidney stones, which hastened his death. After his death a stone was taken from his body, weighing 25 ounces (1.5 lb, or 0.7 kg), which is preserved in a laboratory at Cambridge. He seemed perfectly prepared for death, often saying "Solum mihi superest sepulchrum" ("All my business is to fit me for the grave"). His funeral sermon was preached by Dr. Hardy, at St Katherine Cree Church, before his children and many of his relations. He was buried in a barrel vault excavated under the altar of St Mary and St Margaret Church, Sprowston, Norfolk, and a large marble monument was erected above it. His descendants enjoyed the title down to Sir Thomas Adams, the sixth baronet, who died a captain in the Royal Navy in 1770.

== Legacy ==
Renowned as a public benefactor, in his lifetime Sir Thomas gave his house at Wem as a free-school (Thomas Adams School) to the town, and endowed it; he founded an Arabic professorship at Cambridge in 1643, and paid for the printing of the Gospels in Persian, and for sending them into the east. Despite suffering great losses in his estate, he left legacies to the poor of many parishes, to hospitals, and ministers' widows in his will.

His title and Sprowston estate passed to his eldest son William (1634–1687). His second son Richard is remembered for a collection of verse.

== Sources ==
- Chalmers, Alexander. The General Biographical Dictionary: Containing an Historical and Critical Account of the Lives and Writings of the most Eminent Persons in Every Nation; Particularly the British and Irish; from the Earliest Accounts to the Present Time. new ed. rev. and enl. London: Nichols [et al.], 1812–1817. 32 vols.
- Keith Roberts, London And Liberty: Ensigns of the London Trained Bands, Eastwood, Nottinghamshire: Partizan Press, 1987, ISBN 0-946525-16-1.

== Notes ==
Civic offices
Preceded by Thomas Atkins	Lord Mayor of the City of London; 1645	Succeeded by John Gayre
Baronetage of England
New creation	Baronet (of London); 1660–1668	Succeeded by William Adams
