= William Steele (Lord Chancellor of Ireland) =

English lawyer, judge and politician

William Steele (bap. 19 August 1610, Sandbach – 1680) was an English lawyer, judge, and politician who sat in the House of Commons in 1654. He was Chief Baron of the Exchequer and Lord Chancellor of Ireland. Steele was also a Puritan Baptist layman.

Steele was a son of Richard Steele of Sandbach, Cheshire, and his wife Cicely Shaw, and was educated at Caius College, Cambridge.

In 1648 he was chosen to be Recorder of London, and he was one of the four counsel appointed to conduct the case against Charles I in January 1649, but illness prevented him from discharging this duty. However, a few days later he took part in the prosecution of James Hamilton, 1st Duke of Hamilton and other leading Royalists.

Steele was elected MP for the City of London in 1654. He was Chief Baron of the Exchequer in 1655, and was made Lord Chancellor of Ireland in 1656. After the fall of Richard Cromwell, he was one of the five commissioners appointed in 1659 to govern Ireland. At the end of that year, he returned to England, but he refused to sit on the committee of safety to which he had been named.

At the Restoration he obtained the full benefits of the Act of Indemnity, but he thought it advisable to reside for a time in Holland. However, he returned to England before his death, towards the end of 1680.

== Family ==
William was the nephew of Thomas Steele (died 1643), who was shot for surrendering Beeston Castle in the Civil War. His brother Laurence Steele (bap. 1616) was Clerk of the Irish House of Commons from 1662 to 1697.

He married firstly in 1638 Elizabeth Godfrey of Kent, daughter of Richard Godfrey, MP for New Romney and Mary Moyle. He married secondly in 1662 Mary Mellish, widow of Michael Harvey (a brother of the noted scientist William Harvey). He had issue by both marriages. His daughter, Mary Steele (died 1673), married George Boddington (1646–1719), a director of the Bank of England. His grandson was the writer Richard Steele (1672–1729), the son of the elder Richard Steele, William's only son from his first marriage, and his wife Elinor Symes (née Sheyls). The elder Richard was an attorney who spent much of his life in Ireland: he died in 1676.

== Family Tree ==

Legal offices
Preceded by Sir John Wilde	Lord Chief Baron of the Exchequer; 1655–1656	Succeeded by Sir Thomas Widdrington
Preceded by In commission - last held by Sir Richard Bolton	Lord Chancellor of Ireland; 1656–1660	Succeeded by Sir Maurice Eustace
