= Thomas Foote =

Local politician in London (1598–1687)

Sir Thomas Foote Bt

Lord Mayor of the City of London
- In office 1649–1649
- Preceded by: Thomas Andrewes
- Succeeded by: Thomas Andrewes

Personal details
- Born: 1598
- Died: 12 October 1687
- Resting place: All Saints Church, West Ham, England

Sir Thomas Foote, 1st Baronet (1598 – 12 October 1687) was a wealthy Citizen and grocer of London. He was Lord Mayor of the City of London in 1649. During the Protectorate he was knighted by the Lord Protector Oliver Cromwell in 1657, and after the Restoration (England) he was made a baronet by Charles II.

== Biography ==
Thomas Foote was a son of John Foote and Margaret (née Brooke) of London and grandson of John Foote of Royston. (Note: John Foote of St Benet Gracechurch, Margret Brooke, spinster, of the same were granted a marriage licences 10 April 1581, and were married 11 April 1581, at St Mary Woolchurch.)

In 1646, Foote was made a Sheriff of London and in 1649 he was elected Lord Mayor of London. He represented London in the First and Second Protectorate Parliaments, and was knighted by the Lord Protector Oliver Cromwell on 5 December 1657 (this honour passed into oblivion at the restoration of the monarchy in May 1660).

Foote was created a baronet, of London, on 21 November 1660, with the title to revert on his death to his son-in-law, Arthur Onslow of West Clandon.

Foote died on 12 October 1687, in his 89th year and was buried in All Saints Church, West Ham, (then in Essex). As he left no sons to succeed him, his son-in-law, Arthur Onslow succeed to baronetcy.

== Family ==
On 16 December 1625 Foote married Elizabeth Boddicot, widow of Augustine Boddicot. He had four daughters:

- Priscilla Foote, married Sir Francis Rolle (d. 1686) on 23 January 1654.
- Mary Foote, married Sir Arthur Onslow, 1st Baronet as his second wife. They had a number of children.
- Sarah Foote, married first Sir John Lewis, 1st Baronet (d. 1671) and second Denzil Onslow (d. 1721) (younger brother of Arthur).
- Elizabeth Foote, married Sir John Cutler, 1st Baronet (1607–1693) as his second wife, they had a daughter who died before he did. (Note: Sir John Cutler was satirised by Alexander Pope for avarice.)

== Notes ==
Civic offices
Preceded by Thomas Andrewes	Lord Mayor of the City of London; 1649	Succeeded by Thomas Andrewes
Baronetage of England
New creation	Baronet (of London); 1660–1687	Extinct (reversion to Arthur Onslow)
