= Ainsty =

Historic district of Yorkshire, England

Coordinates: 53.917°N 1.157°W

The location of the Ainsty

The Ainsty or the Ainsty of York was a historic district of Yorkshire, England, west of the city of York. Originally a wapentake or subdivision of the West Riding of Yorkshire it later had a unique status as a rural area controlled by the corporation of the city.

== Geography ==
The Ainsty covered an area to the west of York, bounded by three rivers: the Nidd to the north; the Ouse to the east and the Wharfe to the south. The Ainsty was unique among the wapentakes of Yorkshire in that it was not formally included in any Ridings from 1449 until 1836.

Much of the Ainsty consists of floodplain intersected by streams (e.g. Dam Dike, Healaugh Beck, Sike Beck, The Foss) and man-made drainage channels (e.g. Moor Drain). Being low-lying and surrounded by rivers, in mediaeval times it was fenny and prone to flooding, particularly in winter. As a result, villages tend to occupy slight rises, and the settlements of the Ainsty are dispersed with some areas, such as Marston Moor, almost completely devoid of buildings.

The Ainsty is now divided between the City of York and the counties of North Yorkshire and West Yorkshire.

== Early history ==
The Ainsty is first recorded in the Domesday Book of 1086 (in the form Ainestig), when it was a wapentake of the West Riding of Yorkshire. It was named from Ainsty Cliff at Bilbrough, presumably the original meeting place of the wapentake. Ainsty Cliff was itself named from a small narrow path which led from Steeton Farm over Ainsty Cliff to Bilbrough. The word Ainsty is from Old English ān stīga, meaning "one-man path" or "narrow path", which became einstigi in Old Norse.

The city of York later claimed jurisdiction over the area under a royal charter of King John granted in the early 13th century. The validity of this charter was a matter of dispute between the city and the Crown, eventually leading to the imprisonment of the mayor in 1280 when it was proved that a clause in the document had been altered. The bailiffs of the city were subsequently able to resume jurisdiction of the wapentake, although it was not formally included in the city when it was created a county of itself in 1396.

In 1449 the Ainsty was annexed to York, with the sheriffs of the city assuming authority. The city, which was said to be "in decay", was granted the "privileges and franchises" of the Ainsty to improve its financial position. In 1463 the mayor and aldermen were made justices of the peace with the commission of oyer and terminer.

Many Ainsty villages have churches with well-preserved Norman (Romanesque) features, e.g. Tockwith, Moor Monkton, Bilton-in-Ainsty, Askham Richard, Askham Bryan, Healaugh, and Wighill. The comparative absence of alteration to these churches after c. 1200 (and of large later churches) suggests that the Ainsty was something of an economic backwater during the later mediaeval period. The area contains the sites of at least two deserted villages: Easedike, just north of Tadcaster on the Wharfe, and Wilstrop on the south bank of the Nidd.

The English Civil War battlefield of Marston Moor (1644) lies within the Ainsty, near Long Marston.

== Municipal reform ==
The Municipal Corporations Act 1835 reformed the city of York as a municipal borough with effect from 1 January 1836. It was unclear if the reformed corporation still had jurisdiction in the Ainsty. The matter was finally settled by the Municipal Corporation (Boundaries) Act 1836, which came into force in August. Under the legislation the Ainsty was declared to be part of the West Riding for all purposes. When elected county councils were created by the Local Government Act 1888, the Ainsty's inclusion in the West Riding was confirmed.

By the 19th century, the Ainsty had two divisions: the eastern, or York Division, and the western, or Tadcaster Division.

Like other similar subdivisions of counties, although the Ainsty was never formally abolished, it ceased to have any function in the latter half of the 19th century. The former area of the wapentake is now divided between the unitary City of York and the former districts of Harrogate and Selby in North Yorkshire.

== Constituent parishes and townships ==
From 1866 the wapentake comprised the following civil parishes:

- Acaster Malbis
- Acaster Selby
- Acomb
- Angram
- Appleton Roebuck
- Askham Bryan
- Askham Richard
- Bickerton
- Bilbrough
- Bilton
- Bishopthorpe
- Bolton Percy
- Catterton
- Colton
- Copmanthorpe
- Dringhouses
- Healaugh
- Hessay
- Holgate
- Hutton Wandesley
- Knapton
- Long Marston
- Middlethorpe
- Moor Monkton
- Nether Poppleton
- Oxton
- Rufforth
- Steeton
- Tadcaster East
- Thorp Arch
- Tockwith
- Upper Poppleton
- Walton
- Wighill
- Wilstrop

== Legacy ==
The Ainsty gave its name to the Selby and Ainsty parliamentary constituency, contested at the general election of 2010, and the New Ainsty Deanery of the Church of England.

The Ainsty Bounds Walk is a 44-mile (71 km) footpath around Ainsty.

Ainsty is also the name of a residential area of Wetherby developed in the 1950s, including Ainsty Road, Ainsty Crescent, Ainsty Drive and Ainsty View.

The Ainsty is the name of a public house in the Acomb area of York.

Ainsty also gives its name to Ainsty Court inside Halifax College, a college within the University of York.
