= St Helen's Church, Bilton-in-Ainsty =

Church in Bilton-in-Ainsty, North Yorkshire, England

Coordinates: 53°56′51″N 1°16′34″W

St Helen’s ancient Parish Church, Bilton-in-Ainsty
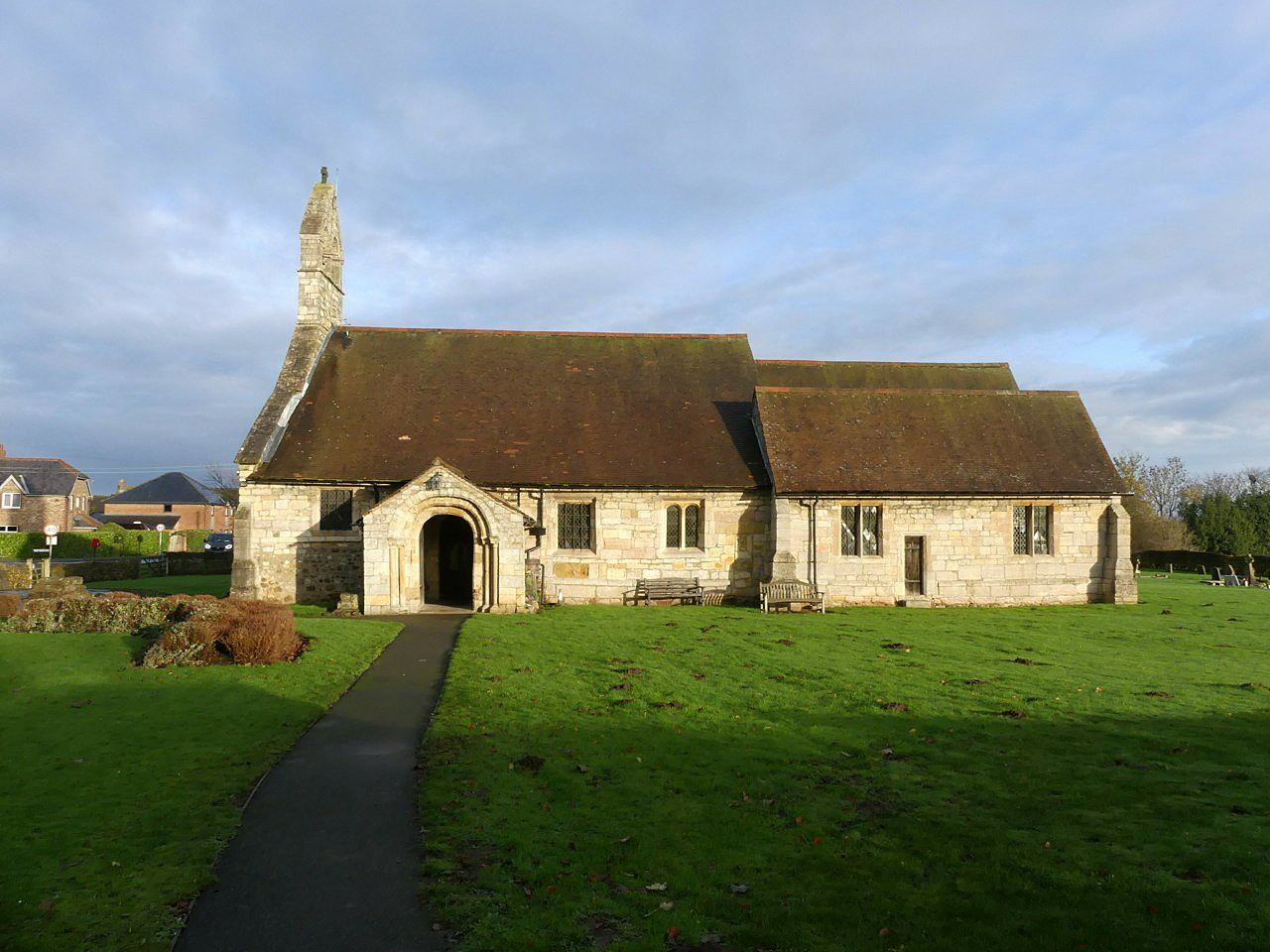
- The church, seen from the south, in 2022
- St Helen’s ancient Parish Church, Bilton-in-Ainsty
- OS grid reference: SE 47604 50382
- Country: England
- Denomination: Church of England

Architecture
- Completed: 1150

St Helen's Church is the parish church of Bilton-in-Ainsty, a village west of York in North Yorkshire, in England.

Although no church in the village is mentioned in the Domesday Book, the various Saxon fragments incorporated in the current building suggest that there was a previous church on the site. The current church was built in about 1150 by the Haget family. In 1160, its advowson was granted to Syningthwaite Priory, then in 1293 it became a prebendary of York Minster. In the first half of the 13th century, north and south aisles were added to the nave, and in the 15th century, these were extended along the chancel. More new windows were inserted in the 17th century, and the porch door is dated 1633.

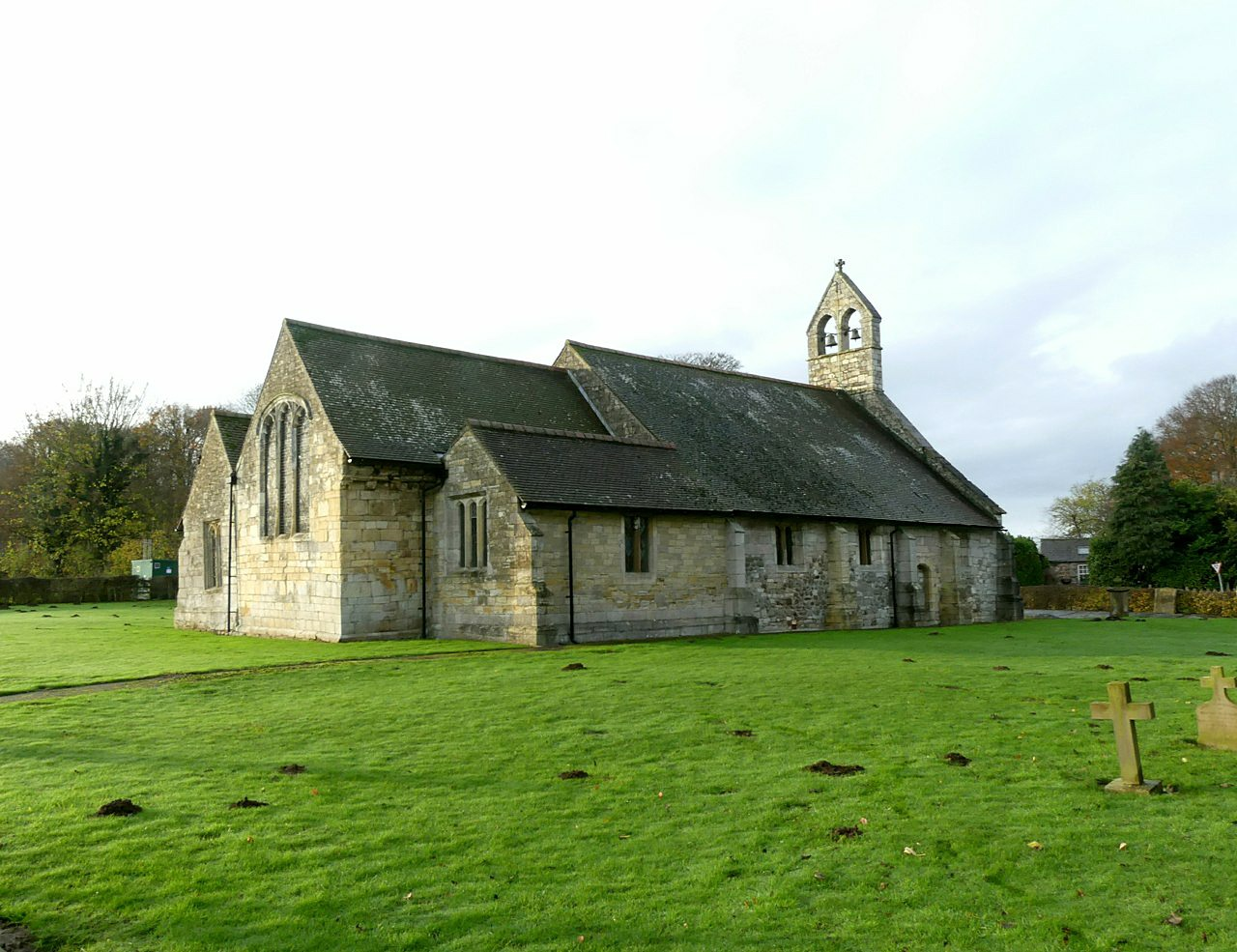
The church, seen from the north east, in 2022

It is claimed that the church served as a military hospital following the Battle of Marston Moor, in 1644. A satirical carving of a crowned snake, in the church door, has been attributed to a Royalist officer held prisoner in the building. From 1869 to 1871, the church was restored by George Gilbert Scott, who removed a west gallery, replaced the pews, and found parts of various early crosses buried in the churchyard. The church was Grade I listed in 1966.

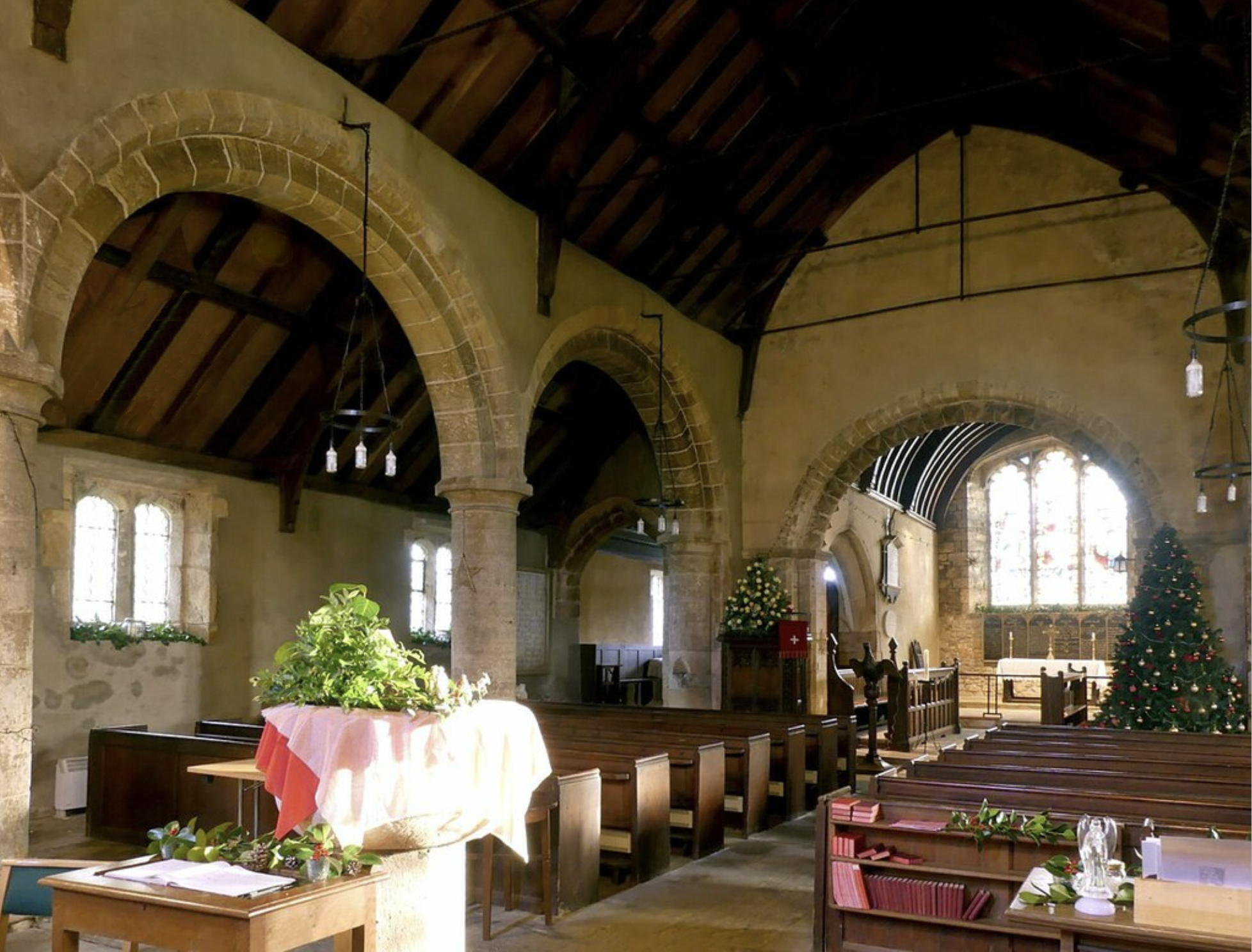
View from the nave into the chancel

The church is constructed of limestone and cobbles. It has a four-bay nave and three-bay chancel, aisles, a south porch, and a bellcote at the west end. The bellcote dates from the 17th century and is believed to have replaced a bell tower. The west wall has a restored Norman arched window, with an oculus window above, and the south aisle has a possible Saxon window in its west wall, reset in the 13th century and restored by Scott.

Inside, the aisles have arcades with circular piers. The chancel has remains of a piscina, and has corbels in the eaves with early carvings of animals and two sheela na gigs. There is also a carved mass dial. There are fragments of three 10th-century Anglo-Norse crosses, and one Saxon cross. There is a brass monument of about 1400, which is believed to depict an abbess of Syningthwaite. The plain bowl font was moved from Tockwith. There is also an altar table from about 1600 and an eagle lectern of similar date.

The Church also contains a female effigy, likely of Alice Vavasour (née Cockfield), crafted out of fine sandstone and depicts the woman holding a bird. Alice was a descendant of the Haget family and a patron to local Priories. Alice may have been buried at the church but likely she was buried at Syningthwaite Priory, built by Bertram Haget. If she was buried in the Priory she would’ve been moved to St Helen’s after its dissolution.

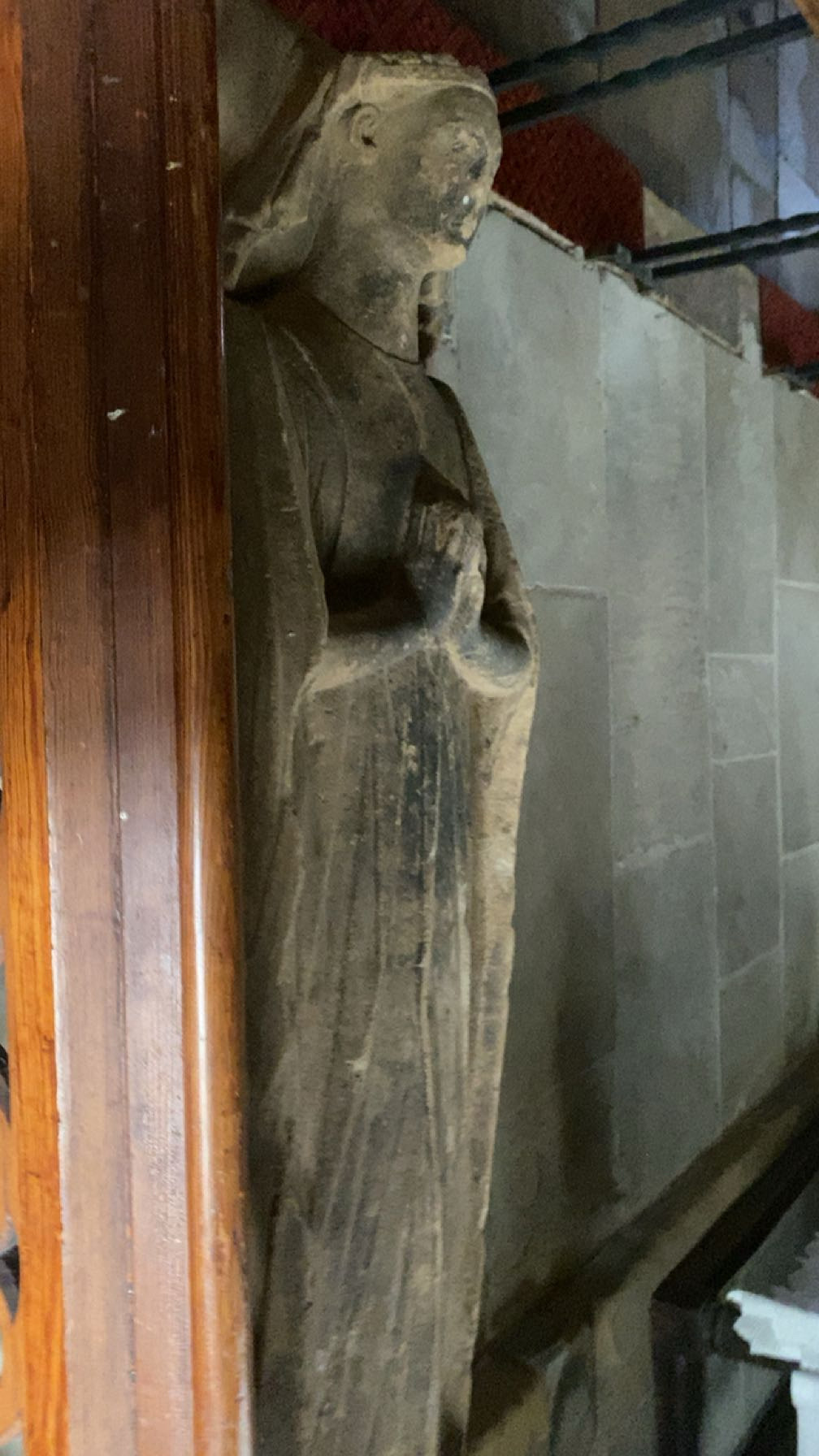
The effigy, associated with Alice Vavasour.

In 2015 the effigy was moved to the north aisle sanctuary during restoration to remove algae from the Church.

== See also ==
- Grade I listed buildings in North Yorkshire (district)
- Listed buildings in Bilton-in-Ainsty with Bickerton
