= St John the Baptist's Church, Hessay =

Anglican church in Hessay

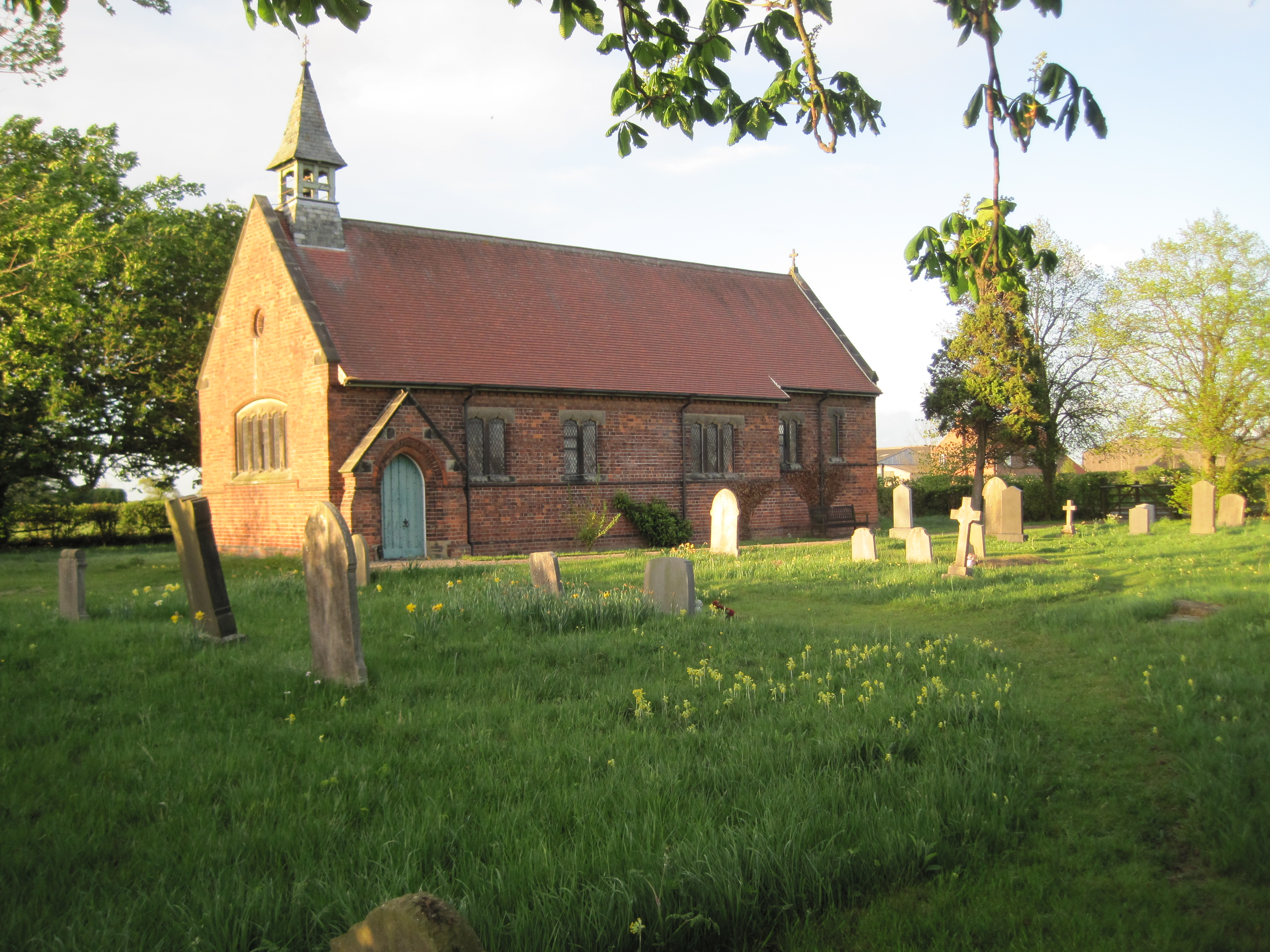
The church, in 2013

St John the Baptist's Church is an Anglican church in Hessay, a village in North Yorkshire, in England.

Until the late 19th century, villagers in Hessay travelled to All Saints' Church, Moor Monkton to worship. In 1898, work started on a church in a field just outside the village. The building was designed by Charles Hodgson Fowler, and it was consecrated on 8 November 1899. It cost about £1,000, and on completion had seating for 72 worshippers. In 1905, an organ was installed, moved from St Philip and St James' Church, Clifton. The Yorkshire Post describes it as a "fine Anglican church". It has never had electricity or heating installed.

The building is constructed of red brick with stone dressings, and a tiled roof. It consists of a nave, chancel and vestry and there is a bellcote at the west end. Many of the windows have two lights, with the west window having five lights, and the east window having three lights and tracery. Inside, there is a central aisle. The chancel has a tiled floor, while the nave has a floor of woodblocks laid on concrete.
