= Cyril Lemprière =

English rugby league footballer

- Baines Cigarette card featuring Cyril Lempriere

Personal information
- Full name: Charles Cyril Lemprière
- Born: 19 April 1870; Hull, England
- Died: 24 January 1939 (aged 68); Ely, England

Playing information
- Position: Wing
Club
Years	Team	Pld	T	G	FG	P
1895–01	Hull FC
Representative
Years	Team	Pld	T	G	FG	P
1898–99	Yorkshire	1

Charles Cyril Lemprière (19 April 1870 – 24 January 1939) was an English professional rugby league footballer who played in the 1890s and 1900s. He played at representative level for Yorkshire, and at club level for Hull FC, as a wing, and was captain of Hull during the 1895–96 season and 1897–98 season. From about 1899 he was a schoolmaster, establishing a prep school for boys at Harrogate which moved to Moor Monkton, near York, in 1902. He retired in 1922.

== Background ==
Lemprière was born in Hull, East Riding of Yorkshire, the eldest son of Captain Percy Reid Lemprière, RA, younger brother of Major-General Arthur Reid Lempriere. His grandfather was born in Jersey. He was educated in Worcester and at Radley College before attending the University of Oxford, earning honours in Classical Moderations, 1891. In about 1899 he founded the Carteret School in Harrogate which, in 1902, moved to the Red House, Moor Monkton, near York. Initially he rented the premises from the Slingsby family of Scriven but, in 1916, he purchased the house and land adjacent. He believed the rural location was ideal for preparatory schoolboys, providing them with a healthy environment and space for outside activity. He included classics and science on the curriculum while also encouraging practical skills such as woodwork and gardening. The boys were involved in the running of a school farm which sold provisions to the school kitchen. In 1922 he retired but maintained a close contact with the school. His death aged 68 was registered in Ely district, Cambridgeshire.

== County honours ==
Cyril Lemprière won a cap for Yorkshire (alongside Albert Goldthorpe) in the victory over Cheshire during the 1898–99 season.
