= Listed buildings in Moor Monkton =

Moor Monkton is a civil parish in the county of North Yorkshire, England. It contains six listed buildings that are recorded in the National Heritage List for England. Of these, two are listed at Grade II*, the middle of the three grades, and the others are at Grade II, the lowest grade. The parish contains the village of Moor Monkton and the surrounding countryside. The listed buildings consist of a church, a chapel, three houses, and a railway signal box.

== Key ==
Grade	Criteria
II*	Particularly important buildings of more than special interest
II	Buildings of national importance and special interest

== Buildings ==
Name and location	Photograph	Date	Notes	Grade
All Saints' Church; 53.99781°N 1.22206°W		12th century	The church has been altered and extended through the centuries, including a restoration in 1878–79 by James Fowler. It is built in sandstone and gritstone with a tile roof, and consists of a nave, a south porch, a chancel, and a west tower. The tower has three stages, clasping buttresses, string courses, a round-headed west window with nook shafts, a narrow round-headed window in the middle stage, two round-headed bell openings on each front with a continuous hood mould, and a plain parapet on corbels, with gargoyles on the corners. The south doorway and the priest's door, both round-headed, date from the 12th century.	II*
Red House School Chapel; 54.00708°N 1.19314°W	—	Early 17th century	The chapel is in brick with stone dressings, quoins, a stepped eaves course, and a Welsh slate roof. There are two storeys, open to the roof, and three bays. The south front contains a two-light mullioned window, above which thee three-light windows with cinquefoil heads. The west gable end contains a round-headed doorway with imposts and a keystone, and an inscription in brick above, and in the east gable end is a three-light Perpendicular window.	II*
Church Farmhouse; 54.00572°N 1.22459°W	—	Late 18th century	The house is in brick, with a dentilled eaves course, and a pantile roof with brick kneelers and raised gable ends. There are two storeys and three bays. The doorway has a fanlight, the windows are sashes, and all are under elliptical arches.	II
Rosemead Farmhouse; 54.00536°N 1.22777°W	—	Late 18th century	The house is in brick, and has a pantile roof with stone coping and shaped kneelers. There are two storeys and two bays. The central doorway has a pediment, and the windows are sashes, those on the ground floor under elliptical arches.	II
The Red House; 54.00709°N 1.19363°W	—	1864	The house, at one time a school, incorporating earlier features, it is in brick, with stone dressings, quoins, a floor band, and a Westmorland slate roof with gable coping and shaped kneelers. The main front has two storeys and attics, and eight bays. Two of the bays project, and are gabled, and on the front are three massive chimney stacks. The left gable bay contains a doorway with a Tudor arch, most of the windows are transomed, and in the attics are three flat-roofed dormers.	II
Marston Moor Signal Box; 53.98460°N 1.22217°W		1910	The signal box was built by the Southern Division of the North Eastern Railway. It is in timber, with horizontal weatherboarding, on a brick plinth, and has a Welsh slate roof. There is a single storey with continuous glazing on the front and gable ends, and the entrance is in the west gable. The roof overhangs, and there are plain bargeboards, and spiked-ball finials with ball pendants.	II
