= James Hampton (priest) =

English cleric and writer

James Hampton (1721–1778) was an English cleric and writer, known as the translator of the Ancient Greek historian Polybius.

== Life ==
Baptized on November 2, 1721, Hampton was the son of James Hampton of Bishop's Waltham, Hampshire. He entered Winchester College in 1733, and was elected a scholar of Corpus Christi College, Oxford, matriculating on 20 July 1739. At Oxford Hampton was noted for his scholarship and violent behavior, on one occasion provoking a quarrel by kicking over a tea table in the rooms of William Collins with whom he'd been at school. He graduated B.A. in 1743, and M.A. in 1747, and took holy orders.

Lord-chancellor Henley presented Hampton, in 1762, to the rectory of Monkton-Moor, Yorkshire on the basis of his Polybius translation: Hampton dedicated to Henley the second edition of the work. In 1775 he obtained the sinecure rectory of Folkton, Yorkshire, which he held with his other benefice.

Hampton died at Knightsbridge, Middlesex, apparently unmarried, in June 1778. He left his property to William Graves of the Inner Temple.

== Works ==
In 1741 Hampton began on Polybius by publishing A Fragment of the 6th Book, containing a Dissertation on Government, translated, with notes, by a Gentleman, London. This was followed by a translation of the first five books and part of the fragments (2 vols., London, 1756–61), which between that date and 1823 went through at least seven editions.

Hampton's other works were:

- An Essay on Ancient and Modern History, Oxford, 1746, which contains an evaluation of Gilbert Burnet as a historian.
- A Plain and Easy Account of the Fall of Man. In which the distinct agency of an evil spirit is asserted, and the objection, taken from the silence of Moses upon that point, fully answered, London, 1750.
- Two Extracts from the sixth Book of the general history of Polybius, . . . translated from the Greek. To which are prefixed some reflections tending to illustrate the doctrine of the author concerning the natural destruction of mixed governments, with an application of it to the state of Britain, London, 1764.
