= Bilton-in-Ainsty =

Village near York, North Yorkshire, England

Coordinates: 53.944500°N 1.275100°W

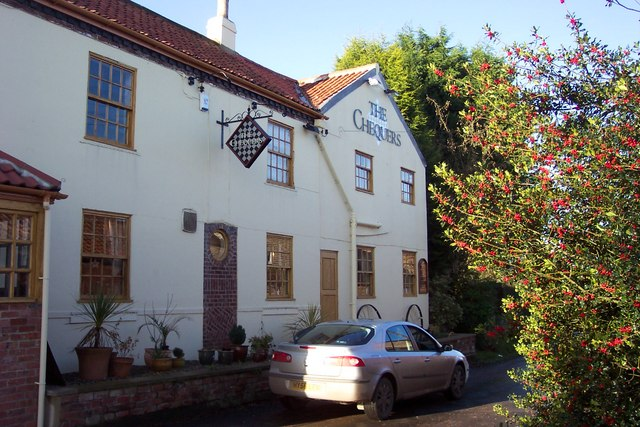
- The Chequers

- Location within North Yorkshire
- OS grid reference: SE476500
  - London: 175 mi (282 km) S
- Civil parish: Bilton-in-Ainsty with Bickerton
- Unitary authority: North Yorkshire
- Ceremonial county: North Yorkshire
- Region: Yorkshire and the Humber
- Country: England
- Sovereign state: United Kingdom
- Post town: YORK
- Postcode district: YO26
- Dialling code: 01423
- Police: North Yorkshire
- Fire: North Yorkshire
- Ambulance: Yorkshire
- UK Parliament: Wetherby and Easingwold

Bilton-in-Ainsty is a village in the civil parish of Bilton-in-Ainsty with Bickerton, in North Yorkshire, England. It lies about 4 miles (6 km) east of Wetherby and 8 miles (13 km) west of York. Bilton had a population of 147 in 2006.

== Geography and communications ==
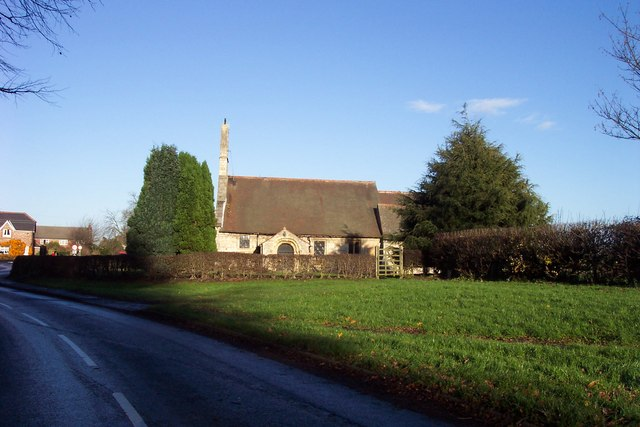
St Helen's Church

The village is situated on the B1224 York to Wetherby road. The soil is primarily loam. The village is surrounded by farmland. The nearest villages are Long Marston 1.7 miles (2.7 km) to the east, Tockwith 1.5 miles (2.4 km) to the north and Bickerton 1.5 miles (2.4 km) to the west. There is no road access to the south of the village. The village has a church and a pub, The Chequers. There is a bus service between York and Wetherby running through village. There are public footpaths to Tockwith to the north, Healaugh to the south-east, Wighill to the south and Syningthwaite to the south-west.

== Governance ==
The village is part of the Wetherby and Easingwold Parliamentary constituency.

On 1 April 1937 the parish of Bickerton was merged with Bilton, on 1 June 1956, the merged parish was renamed to "Bilton in Ainsty", on 26 October 1988 the parish was renamed to "Bilton in Ainsty with Bickerton". In 1931 the parish of Bilton (prior to the merge) had a population of 217.

Until 1974 it was part of the West Riding of Yorkshire. From 1974 to 2023 it was part of the Borough of Harrogate, it is now administered by the unitary North Yorkshire Council.

== Heritage ==
=== Historic buildings ===
St Helen's Church is a Grade I listed building. Standing at the crossroads with the main road, it was built in the Norman style in 1166. It was associated with the Syningthwaite Cistercian nunnery founded about the same time and dissolved in 1535. The church underwent restoration around 1870 under the direction of George Gilbert Scott. It contains two medieval sheela na gig figurative carvings, as well as a carving of a mermaid pulling her tresses, several corbels, a cross from the Anglo-Saxon period, and other carved fragments.

Bilton Hall became a Grade II listed building in 1966, cited as a "small country house. Early-mid C18 with extensions and alterations c. 1865." Also listed Grade II at that time was a private house known as Bilton Brow. It has a style similar to the additions to Bilton Hall.

One building converted to residential use is an 1845 Wesleyan chapel and Sunday school. The village school, likewise Grade II listed and converted to residential use, was founded by Hall Plumer in 1801, closed in 1928, and then served as a village hall until 1973.

=== History ===
A Bronze Age hoard was discovered on Bilton Moor, pointing to prehistoric habitation. Bilton is an Anglo-Saxon name meaning Bilo's or Billa's Homestead. Ainsty was the name of the wapentake. The village appears in the Domesday Book in 1086 as Biletone of the Annesti (Bilton in Ainsty). The parish registers go back in 1571 and record for 1644 the burial of several soldiers killed in the nearby Battle of Marston Moor, after which some Royalist prisoners were held in the church. Bilton Hall and its manor passed to the Plumer family in the 18th century, who established a school in 1801.

John Marius Wilson's Imperial Gazetteer of England and Wales (1870–72) described Bilton, then including not only Bickerton, but Tockwith, as follows: "BILTON, a township, a parish, and a subdistrict in the district of Tadcaster, W. R. Yorkshire. The township lies on the York and High Harrogate railway, near Hammerton station, 5 miles ENE of Wetherby; and has a post office under York. Acres, 1,460.-Real property, £2,606. Pop., 242. Houses, 44. The parish includes also the townships of Bickerton and Tockwith. Acres, 4,150. Real property, £6,894. Pop., 926 Houses, 201. A Cistercian nunnery was founded here, at Symingthwaite, about 1,160, by Bertram de Haget. The living is a vicarage in the diocese of York Value. £300.* Patron, the Prebendary of Bilton. Tockwith was made a separate benefice in 1867. There are two Wesleyan chapels and an endowed school.-The subdistrict comprises two parishes and two parts. Pop., 1,493."

== Notable people ==
The writer sisters Annie (1825–1879) and Eliza Keary (1827–1918) were born at what is now the Old Vicarage, Church Lane, Bilton-in-Ainsty, where their father, Rev. William Keary, was vicar and their mother Lucy the daughter of Hall Plumer of Bilton Hall. A third sister, Maud, also took part in joint writing projects. The oldest brother, also William Keary and born in Bilton, was a solicitor who became the first mayor of Stoke-on-Trent, when it was incorporated in 1874.

== Sport ==
Bilton-in-Ainsty has a village cricket club, the BIACC, founded in 1932. The club plays in the York and District League Galtres Division 2 and Wetherby League Division 3. It is nicknamed the Frogs for its team badge.

== See also ==
- Listed buildings in Bilton-in-Ainsty with Bickerton

== External resources ==
- W. V. Crapp: Some Historical Notes on the Parish and Parish Church of St Helen's, Bilton in Ainsty with Bickerton, 1973.
