= Listed buildings in Bilton-in-Ainsty with Bickerton =

Bilton-in-Ainsty with Bickerton is a civil parish in the county of North Yorkshire, England. It contains 15 listed buildings that are recorded in the National Heritage List for England. Of these, two are listed at Grade I, the highest of the three grades, and the others are at Grade II, the lowest grade. The parish contains the villages of Bilton-in-Ainsty and Bickerton and the surrounding countryside. The listed buildings include houses and associated structures, a church with a war memorial and a mounting block in the churchyard, a former chapel, three mileposts and a war memorial.

== Key ==
| Grade | Criteria |
|---|---|
| I | Buildings of exceptional interest, sometimes considered to be internationally important |
| II | Buildings of national importance and special interest |

== Buildings ==
| Name and location | Photograph | Date | Notes | Grade |
|---|---|---|---|---|
| St Helen's Church; 53.94739°N 1.27622°W | | 12th century | The church has been extended and altered through the centuries, including a restoration in 1869–71 by George Gilbert Scott. The church is built in limestone and cobbles and has a tile roof. It consists of a nave, north and south aisles, a south porch, and a chancel with a north vestry and a south chapel. The west wall contains a 12th-century window with a circular window above and a bellcote on the gable. The entrance to the porch has two orders of colonnettes with waterleaf and scalloped capitals and a double-chamfered round arch, and the doorhead has a scalloped design with a date and initials. | I |
| Syningthwaite Priory Farmhouse; 53.93225°N 1.29842°W | — | 12th century | The oldest part is the rear wing, the surviving refectory range of a previous convent, the rest being added later, and the front range dating from the early 19th century. It is in limestone with some brick, and has a roof of pantile at the rear and grey slate on the front range. There are two storeys, a front range of three bays and a three-bay wing at the rear. The front range has a central doorway with a fanlight, and sash windows with splayed voussoirs. In the rear wing is a round-arched doorway with a chamfered surround, colonettes with weathered capitals, leaf motifs in the moulded spandrels, and a hood mould with carved stops. The windows include a three-light mullioned window with Tudor arched lights and a hood mould, sash windows, a horizontally-sliding sash, and a fire window. | I |
| Mounting block 53.94741°N 1.27645°W | | 17th century (possible) | The mounting block is in the churchyard of St Helen's Church to the west of the church. It is in limestone, and consists of a platform about 80 centimetres (31 in) high flanked by four steps. | II |
| Bilton Hall; 53.94485°N 1.28120°W | | Early to mid 18th century | A small country house that has been altered, particularly in about 1865. It is in rendered limestone and brick on a plinth, and has a modillion eaves cornice and a hipped slate roof. There are two storeys and five bays. The south front has a central doorway with a fanlight, and a doorcase with fluted Doric columns, a frieze with triglyphs and paterae, and a dentilled pediment. Above the doorway is a round-headed window, and the other windows are sashes. In the garden front are three canted bay windows, and the right return contains a doorway with a fanlight and a pediment. | II |
| Folly or game larder, Bilton Hall; 53.94527°N 1.28413°W | — | Late 18th century | The building is in red brick on a stone plinth, with a projecting eaves band and a thatched roof. It is circular, about 6 metres (20 ft) in diameter, and divided into panels by eight pilasters. The building contains two blocked round-arched doorways and circular windows. | II |
| Stable block, Bilton Hall; 53.94533°N 1.28127°W | — | Late 18th century | The stable block and coach house range are in red-brown brick with floor bands and a grey slate roof. The range is symmetrical, consisting of a central block with two storeys and three bays, flanked by recessed single-storey, three-bay wings, ending in two-storey, two-bay ranges with pyramidal roofs. In the centre is a round carriage arch, flanked by round-arched windows in round-arched recesses, continuing as a blind arcade along the front. In the upper floor, the central arch is flanked by circular windows, and the wings contain Diocletian windows. | II |
| The Old Vicarage; 53.94393°N 1.27498°W | | Late 18th century | The vicarage, later a private house, is in red brick, it has a slate roof with gable copings and narrow kneelers, and is in Gothick style. The central doorway has a fanlight, the windows are sashes, and all the openings have pointed arches. | II |
| Old School House; 53.95054°N 1.28339°W | — | Early 19th century | A school, later a private house, in red brick, with a modillion eaves cornice and a grey slate roof. There are two storeys and six bays, the middle two bays projecting under a pediment containing a blind oculus with an inscription and a date. In the centre is a doorway with a fanlight, and the windows are sashes with segmental arches. Projecting to the right is a single-storey schoolroom with mullioned windows. In the left return, facing the road, is a round-arched recess with a keystone, two round-arched windows, and a blocked oculus in the gable. | II |
| Former Methodist Chapel and wall 53.94943°N 1.31338°W | — | 1826 | The former chapel is in limestone, and has a slate roof with gable copings and shaped kneelers. There is a single storey, a front of one bay and two bays on the sides. The front is gabled and contains a doorway with a stone arch, above which is a multipane window with splayed voussoirs, and an inscribed and dated plaque. On the sides are sash windows, and the south wall is blank. Enclosing the forecourt is a limestone wall with triangular coping, ramped down to the gateway. | II |
| Beech Cottage and Church Walk Cottage; 53.94741°N 1.27711°W | | Early to mid 19th century | A house, later divided, in limestone with a hipped grey stone roof. There are two storeys and four bays. On the front and on the left return is a doorway with a fanlight and a hood, and the windows are sashes. | II |
| Bilton Brow; 53.94368°N 1.27449°W | | Early to mid 19th century | A vicarage, later a private house, in red-brown brick and stone, with a moulded string course, a dentilled eaves cornice, and a hipped roof with deep eaves. Three steps lead up to a central doorway that has a fanlight and an open pediment. The windows on the front are sashes in architraves with projecting sills on brackets. In the left return is a staircase window with a cambered arch, and in the right return is a two-storey canted bay window and a flat-roofed dormer. | II |
| Milepost east of Springs Lane; 53.94416°N 1.33008°W | | Late 19th century | The milepost is on the south side of York Road (B1224 road). It is in gritstone with a cast iron face, about 80 centimetres (31 in) high, and has a triangular plan and a rounded top. On the top is inscribed "COLLINGHAM AND YORK ROAD" and "BICKERTON", on the left side are the distances to Wetherby, Collingham and Leeds", and on the right side the distance to "York". | II |
| Milepost east of the turning to Bickerton; 53.94817°N 1.30672°W | | Late 19th century | The milepost is on the south side of York Road (B1224 road). It is in gritstone with a cast iron face, about 80 centimetres (31 in) high, and has a triangular plan and a rounded top. On the top is inscribed "COLLINGHAM AND YORK ROAD" and "BICKERTON", on the left side are the distances to Wetherby, Collingham and Leeds", and on the right side the distance to "York". | II |
| Milepost west of the turning to Bilton; 53.94769°N 1.28248°W | | Late 19th century | The milepost is on the south side of York Road (B1224 road). It is in gritstone with a cast iron face, about 80 centimetres (31 in) high, and has a triangular plan and a rounded top. On the top is inscribed "COLLINGHAM AND YORK ROAD" and "BILTON", on the left side are the distances to Wetherby, Collingham and Leeds", and on the right side the distance to "York". | II |
| War memorial 53.94740°N 1.27639°W | | 1920 | The war memorial is in the churchyard of St Helen's Church to the west of the church. It is in Portland stone on a square limestone base of three steps. The lower plinth has a chamfered and moulded base and a top with a laurel wreath. The shaft is square and carries a sculpture of Christ under a gabled roof. On the front are the names of those lost in the First World War. | II |
