= Wilstrop =

Civil parish in North Yorkshire, England

Coordinates: 53.992186°N 1.2572426°W

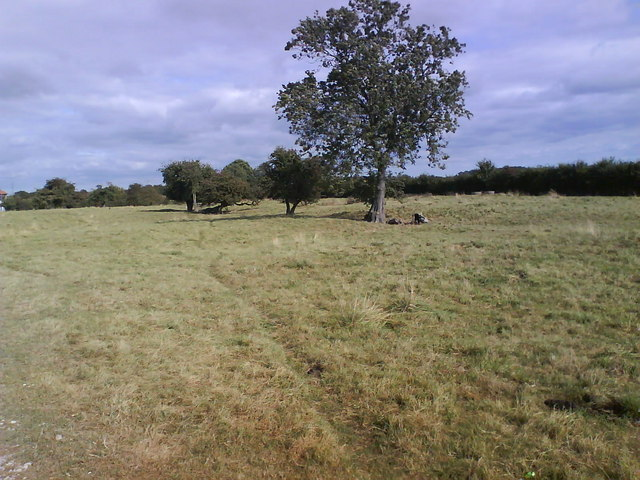

- Location within North Yorkshire
- Area: 4.36 km^{2} (1.68 sq mi)
- Population: 44 (2001 census)
  - Density: 10/km^{2} (26/sq mi)
- Civil parish: Wilstrop
- Unitary authority: North Yorkshire
- Ceremonial county: North Yorkshire
- Region: Yorkshire and the Humber
- Country: England
- Sovereign state: United Kingdom
- Police: North Yorkshire
- Fire: North Yorkshire
- Ambulance: Yorkshire
- Website: http://www.tockwith.gov.uk/Tockwith-Wilstrop-Parish-Council/Default.aspx

Wilstrop is a civil parish about 8 miles (13 km) west of York, in the county of North Yorkshire, England. In 2001 the parish had a population of 44, and in 2015 the population was estimated at 60. There is no modern village in the parish. The site of the deserted medieval village of Wilstrop lies near the River Nidd on the northern boundary of the parish.

Wilstrop is also mentioned in an ancient letter that the Borthwick Institute is trying to solve. The parish touches Green Hammerton, Kirk Hammerton, Long Marston, Moor Monkton, Nun Monkton and Tockwith. Wilstrop shares a parish council with Tockwith called "Tockwith with Wilstrop Parish Council".

== Landmarks ==
There is 1 listed building in Wilstrop called "Skip Bridge" which is grade II listed. Wilstrop Siding railway station opened in 1848, closed to passengers in 1931 and closed entirely in 1964.

== History ==
The name "Wilstrop" means 'Wifel's outlying farm/settlement'. Wilstrop was recorded in the Domesday Book as Wilestorp/Wivlestorp. Wilstrop is one of the possible sources of the surname Willstrop. The village of Wilstrop was deserted in the 15th century, when the local landowner evicted the population to make way for sheep grazing. In the 16th century the site was converted into a park. Earthworks still survive. Wilstrop was formerly a township in the parish of Kirk-Hammerton, in the West Riding of Yorkshire. In 1866 Wilstrop became a civil parish in its own right. In 1974 the parish was transferred to the new county of North Yorkshire. From 1974 to 2023 it was part of the Borough of Harrogate, it is now administered by the unitary North Yorkshire Council.
