= Battle of Marston Moor =

1644 battle of the First English Civil War

- Part of the First English Civil War
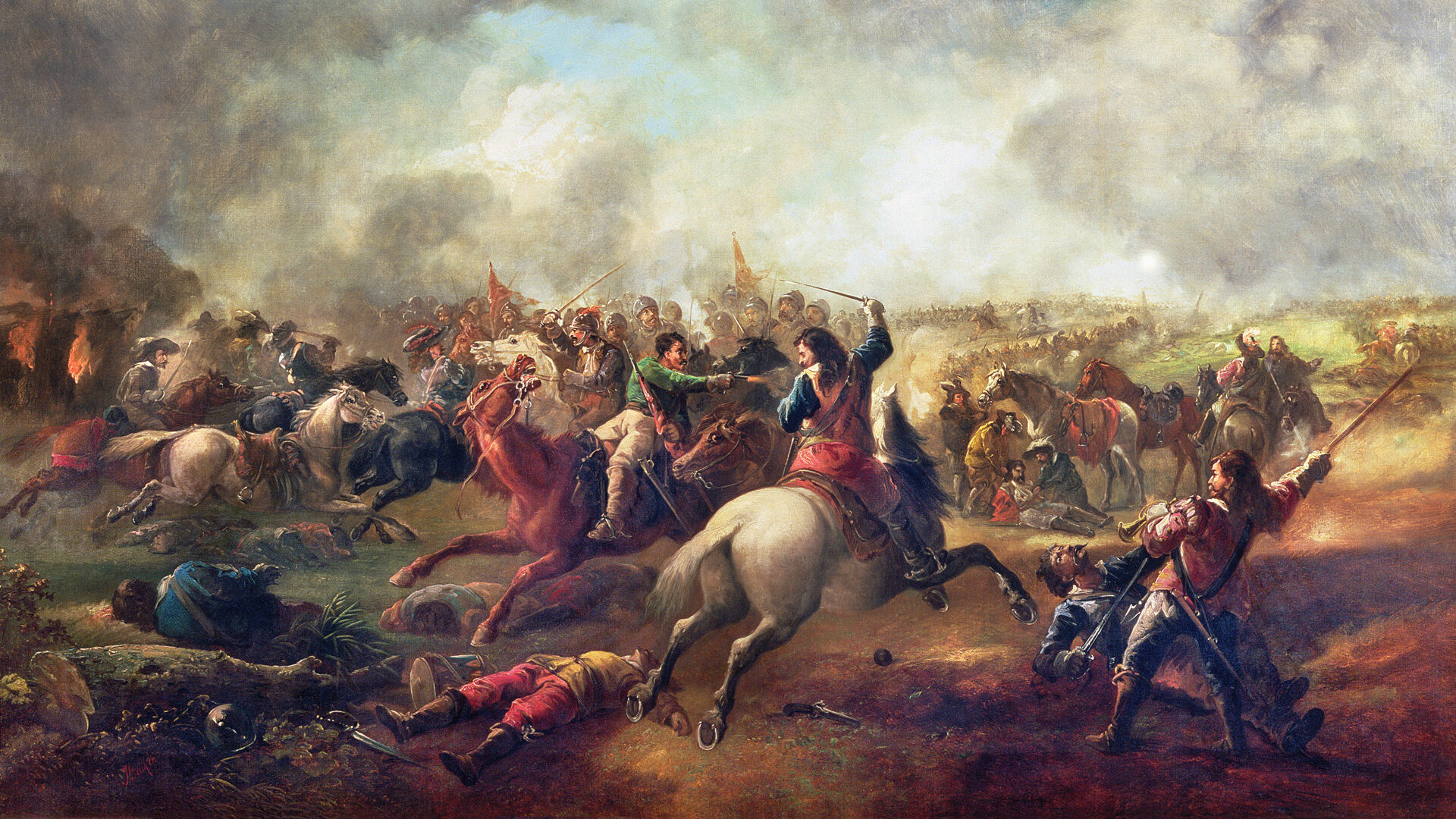
- The Battle of Marston Moor, 2 July 1644; John Joseph Barker
Date	2 July 1644
Location	Near Long Marston, Yorkshire, England 53°57′44″N 1°15′15″W
Result	Parliamentarian-Scottish victory

Belligerents
Parliamentarians; Solemn League and Covenant	Royalists

Commanders and leaders
Earl of Manchester; Lord Fairfax; Oliver Cromwell; Sir Thomas Fairfax; Earl of Leven; David Leslie; William Baillie	Prince Rupert; Marquess of Newcastle; Baron Byron; Lord Goring; Charles Lucas (surrendered); Lord Eythin

Strength
24,500	17,500

Casualties and losses
300 killed	4,000 killed 1,500 captured

North Yorkshire and Long Marston

The Battle of Marston Moor was fought on 2 July 1644, during the Wars of the Three Kingdoms of 1639–1653. (Note: In some older sources this battle is described as taking place on Hessam-Moor. At the time, Hessay Moor and Marston Moor were contiguous areas of uncultivated common land.) The combined forces of the English Parliamentarians under Lord Fairfax and the Earl of Manchester and the Scottish Covenanters under the Earl of Leven defeated the Royalists commanded by Prince Rupert of the Rhine and the Marquess of Newcastle.

During the summer of 1644, the Covenanters and Parliamentarians had been besieging York, which was defended by the Marquess of Newcastle. Rupert had gathered an army which marched through the northwest of England, gathering reinforcements and fresh recruits on the way, and across the Pennines to relieve the city. The convergence of these forces made the ensuing battle the largest of the civil wars.

On 1 July, Rupert outmanoeuvred the Covenanters and Parliamentarians to relieve the city. The next day, he sought battle with them even though he was outnumbered. He was dissuaded from attacking immediately and during the day both sides gathered their full strength on Marston Moor, an expanse of wild meadow west of York. Towards evening, the Covenanters and Parliamentarians themselves launched a surprise attack. After a confused fight lasting two hours, Parliamentarian cavalry under Oliver Cromwell routed the Royalist cavalry from the field and, with Leven's infantry, annihilated the remaining Royalist infantry.

After their defeat the Royalists effectively abandoned Northern England, losing much of the manpower from the northern counties of England (which were strongly Royalist in sympathy) and also losing access to the European continent through the ports on the North Sea coast. Although they partially retrieved their fortunes with victories later in the year in Southern England, the loss of the north was to prove a fatal handicap the next year, when they tried unsuccessfully to link up with the Scottish Royalists under the Marquess of Montrose.

== Background ==
=== Civil war in the north ===
In Northern England the Royalists had the advantage in numbers and local support, except in parts of Lancashire and the West Riding of Yorkshire, where the Parliamentarians had support from the clothing-manufacturing towns which "naturally maligned the gentry". (Note: Quote from Clarendon.) On 30 June 1643, the Royalists commanded by the Marquess of Newcastle defeated the Parliamentarian army of Lord Fairfax at the Battle of Adwalton Moor near Bradford. Fairfax and his son, Sir Thomas Fairfax, fled with their remaining forces to the port of Hull, which was held for Parliament.

Newcastle sent some of his army south into Lincolnshire, as part of a planned "three-pronged" advance on London, but was forced to besiege Hull with most of his forces. The siege failed, as the Parliamentarian navy could supply and reinforce the port and the garrison flooded wide areas around the city, while the Royalist detachments sent into Lincolnshire were defeated at the battles of Gainsborough and Winceby.

In late 1643, the English Civil War widened. King Charles I negotiated a "cessation" in Ireland, which allowed him to reinforce his armies with English regiments (one of horse and twelve of foot) which had been sent to Ireland following the Irish Rebellion of 1641, but Parliament took an even greater step by signing the Solemn League and Covenant, sealing an alliance with the Scottish Covenanters.

Early in 1644, a Covenanter army under the Earl of Leven entered the north of England on behalf of the English Parliament. The Marquess of Newcastle was forced to divide his army, leaving a detachment under Sir John Belasyse to watch the Parliamentarians under Lord Fairfax in Hull, while he led his main body north to confront Leven.

=== Siege of York ===
During March and early April, the Marquess of Newcastle fought several delaying actions as he tried to prevent the Scots from crossing the River Tyne and surrounding the city of Newcastle upon Tyne. Meanwhile, a Parliamentarian cavalry force under Sir Thomas Fairfax, who had been campaigning in Cheshire and Lancashire during the winter, crossed the Pennines and entered the West Riding of Yorkshire. To prevent Sir Thomas rejoining Lord Fairfax in Hull, Belasyse occupied the town of Selby which lay between them. On 11 April, Sir Thomas Fairfax's force, reinforced by infantry under Sir John Meldrum, stormed Selby, capturing Belasyse and most of his force.

Hearing the news, Newcastle realised that the city of York was in danger. York was the principal city and bastion of Royalist power in the north of England, and its loss would be a serious blow to the Royalist cause. He hastily retreated there to forestall the Fairfaxes. Leven left a detachment under the Earl of Callendar to mask the Royalist garrison of Newcastle upon Tyne, and followed the Marquess of Newcastle's army with his main body. On 22 April, Leven and the Fairfaxes joined forces at Wetherby, about 14 mi (23 km) west of York. Together, they began the Siege of York.

Initially, the siege was a rather loose blockade as the Covenanters and Parliamentarians concentrated on capturing smaller Royalist garrisons which threatened their communications with Hull. On 3 June, they were reinforced by the Parliamentarian army of the Eastern Association under the Earl of Manchester. York was now completely encircled and siege operations began in earnest. Leven was accepted as commander in chief of the three combined allied armies before York (referred to by Parliament as the "Army of Both Kingdoms"). It was politic to make the Scottish Covenanters pre-eminent in the north as they were the largest single contingent in the army, but Leven was also a respected veteran of the Thirty Years' War. (Note: The most complete work on his continental service is Murdoch & Grosjean 2014.)

=== Relief moves ===
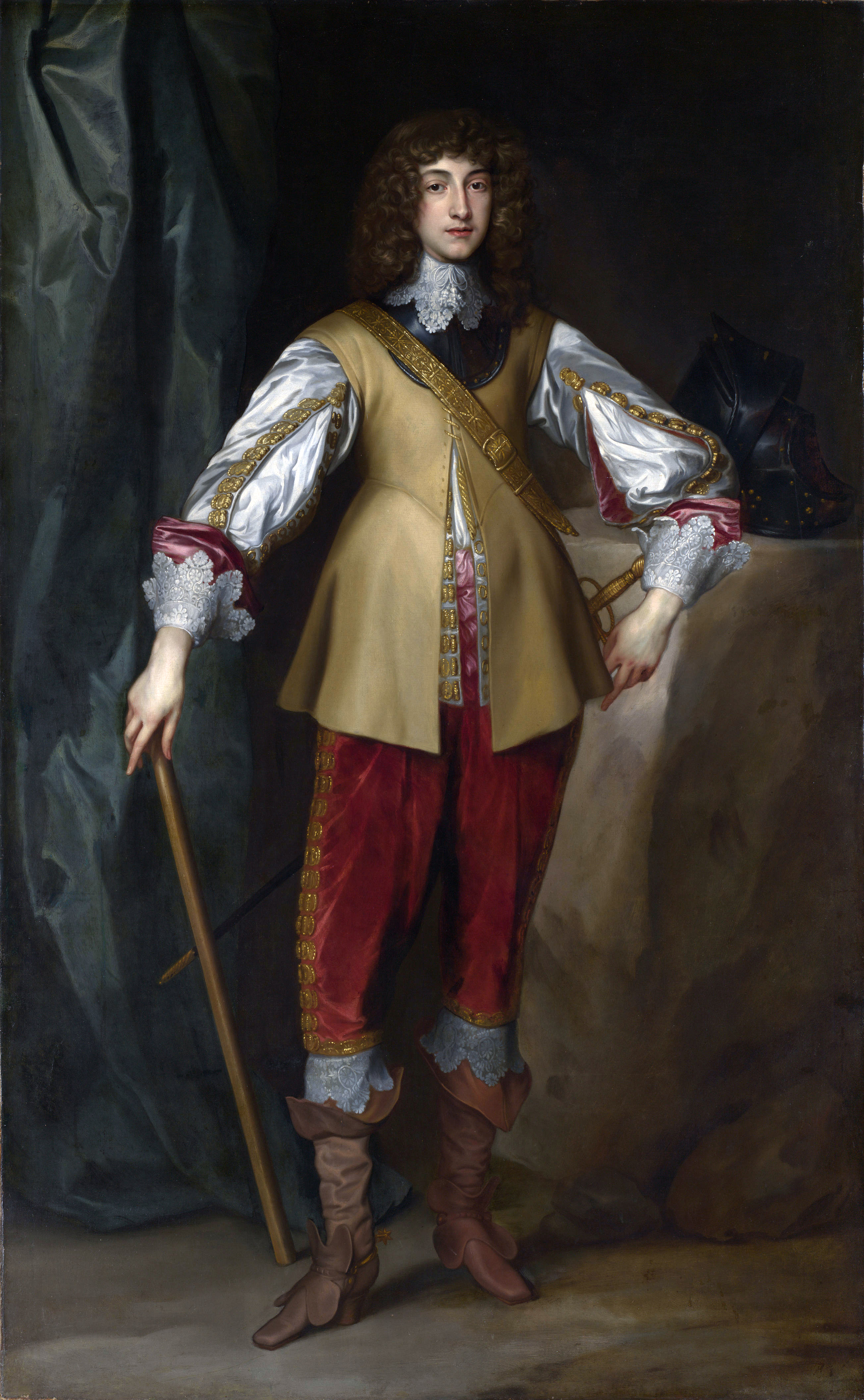
Prince Rupert of the Rhine (1619–1682) – Rupert was ordered to retake the north from Parliament and their Scottish allies.

News of the siege soon reached Oxford, where the King had his wartime capital. From 24 April to 5 May, he held a council of war attended by his nephew and most renowned field commander, Prince Rupert. It was settled that while the King attempted to play for time in Oxford, Rupert would relieve York.

Rupert set out from Shrewsbury with a small force on 16 May. His first moves were intended to gather reinforcements along the way to bolster his army, and secure Lancashire for the troops heading over from Ireland for the Royalist cause. He assumed the direction of a small Royalist army, based on Chester and commanded by Lord John Byron, raising his force to 2,000 horse and 6,000 foot. Having forced a crossing of the River Mersey at Stockport, he stormed Bolton, allegedly killing 1,600 of the Parliamentarian defenders and citizens. Resting at Bury nearby, Rupert was joined by the Marquess of Newcastle's cavalry under Lord George Goring, which had broken out of York early in the siege, with a small contingent from Derbyshire, and several regiments which were being freshly raised in Lancashire by the Earl of Derby. Bypassing the Parliamentarian stronghold of Manchester, Rupert approached Liverpool on 6 June and wrested control of the city from Parliament after a five-day siege.

Rupert now hesitated, unsure whether to proceed to the relief of York or remain to consolidate the Royalist hold on Lancashire, securing more reinforcements in the process. He also distrusted some of the members of the King's council of war and was wary of being so far from the King's side. On 16 June, he received a dispatch from the King which contained troubling news. The King's advisors on the council of war had overturned Rupert's defensive policies, sending the garrisons of Reading and Abingdon on an offensive in the West Country. This had left Oxford exposed to a sudden threat from the Parliamentarian armies commanded by the Earl of Essex and Sir William Waller and forced the King to leave the city in haste and head to Worcester, where he was still in danger. The letter also contained some ambiguous orders regarding Rupert's northern offensive and future plans:

But now I must give the true state of my affairs, which, if their condition be such as enforces me to give you more peremptory commands than I would willingly do, you must not take it ill. If York be lost I shall esteem my crown little less; unless supported by your sudden march to me; and a miraculous conquest in the South, before the effects of the Northern power can be found here. But if York be relieved, and you beat the rebels' army of both kingdoms, which are before it, then (but otherwise not) I may possibly make a shift upon the defensive to spin out time until you come to assist me. Wherefore I command and conjure you, by the duty and affection that I know you bear me, that all new enterprises laid aside, you immediately march according to your first intention, with all your force to the relief of York. But if that be either lost, or have freed themselves from the besiegers, or that for want of powder, you cannot undertake that work, that you immediately march with your whole strength, directly to Worcester to assist me and my army; without which, or you having relieved York by beating the Scots, all the successes you can afterwards have must infallibly be useless onto me.

Rupert understood the letter to be an order both to relieve York and defeat the allied army before heading south once more to aid the King. By this time Rupert's army numbered nearly 14,000. He set out from Liverpool to Preston, which surrendered without a fight. From there he proceeded via Clitheroe and crossed the Pennines to Skipton, where he paused for three days from 26 to 28 June to "fix arms" and await some final reinforcements from Cumberland and Westmoreland. He arrived at the Royalist garrison at Knaresborough Castle 14 mi (23 km) north-west of York on 30 June.

=== Relief of York ===
The allies were aware of Rupert's approach and had been hoping that reinforcements from Manchester under Sir John Meldrum and the Midlands under the Earl of Denbigh could ward off this threat, but they learned that these forces could not intervene in time. The allied armies around York were separated from each other by rivers, and if Rupert attacked them in their siege lines he could destroy any one army before the other two could come to its aid. Therefore, they abandoned the siege on the night of 30 June, and concentrated their forces near the village of Hessay before taking position on Marston Moor, where they blocked Rupert's expected direct march to York (along the old Roman road named Ermine Street, the modern A59), and could easily move to their left to prevent Rupert making any move to the south via Wetherby.

Early on 1 July, some Royalist cavalry advanced from Knaresborough and appeared on the Moor, and the allies prepared for battle. However, Rupert had made a 22 mi (35 km) flank march to the northeast with his main body, crossing the River Ure at Boroughbridge and the River Swale at Thornton Bridge. These two rivers merge to form the River Ouse, which Rupert had successfully put between himself and the allied armies. Later that day, his forces defeated the Earl of Manchester's dragoons, who had been left to guard a bridge of boats across the Ouse at the village of Poppleton a few miles north of York. This had been the only crossing available to the allies above another bridge of boats at Acaster Malbis 5 mi (8.0 km) south of York, and its capture prevented the allies crossing the Ouse to engage Rupert.

More of Rupert's cavalry arrived at York to gain touch with the garrison. With York definitely relieved, Newcastle sent Rupert a fulsome letter of welcome and congratulations. Rupert replied, not in person but through Goring, with a peremptory demand for Newcastle to march his forces to Rupert's assistance on the following morning.

== Battle ==
=== Prelude ===
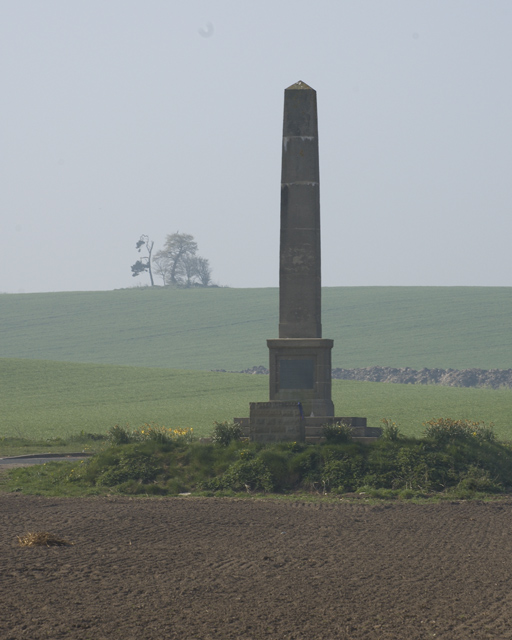
The monument commemorating the battle, alongside the Long Marston – Tockwith road. In the background is Marston Hill, crowned by the clump of trees known as "Cromwell's plump", reputedly the site of the Parliamentarian and Covenanter headquarters.

On learning that they had been outmanoeuvred, the allied commanders debated their options. They decided to march south to Tadcaster and Cawood, where they could both protect their own supply lines from Hull, and also block any move south by Rupert on either side of the Ouse. Their foot (infantry), ordnance and baggage set off early on 2 July, leaving the cavalry and dragoons, commanded by Sir Thomas Fairfax, as rearguard. At about 9 am, the allied generals learned that Rupert's army had crossed the Ouse by the captured bridge of boats at Poppleton and a ford nearby, and was advancing onto Marston Moor. The Covenanter and Parliamentarian foot, some of whom had already reached Tadcaster, were hastily recalled. (Note: Account by Thomas Stockdale to John Rushworth, Clerk's Assistant at the House of Commons.)

However, Newcastle and his Lieutenant General, James King, 1st Lord Eythin, were opposed to any pitched battle and possibly offended by Rupert's high-handed attitude. Rather than join Rupert immediately they temporised, claiming that it would take time to clear the earth and rubble which had been used to block the city gates of York during the siege. Newcastle's soldiers in York then refused to fight unless given their delayed payment, a dispute which Eythin may have fomented. A number were also absent, pillaging the abandoned allied siege works and encampments outside the city, and had yet to return.

Around midday, Rupert was joined on Marston Moor by Newcastle, accompanied by a mounted troop of "gentleman volunteers" only. Rupert greeted him by saying, "My Lord, I wish you had come sooner with your forces, but I hope we shall yet have a glorious day." Newcastle counselled that the three allied armies, with separate garrisons, recruiting areas and lines of communication to protect, would eventually separate. He also suggested waiting for a force of 3,000 under Colonel Clavering and collected garrisons amounting to another 2,000 to join the Royalist army. Rupert was adamant that the King's letter (which he never showed to Newcastle) was a command to engage and defeat the enemy immediately. (Note: Account of the Duchess of Newcastle.) Furthermore, Rupert wished to compensate for the Royalists' numerical inferiority by catching the enemy unawares, and before further Parliamentarian reinforcements could increase their superiority in numbers.

However, without Newcastle's infantry, and with his own infantry exhausted from their long march on the previous day, Rupert was unable to attack, and the odds against him lengthened as the day wore on, and the Scots and Parliamentarian infantry and artillery returned from their aborted move south and took position.

At about 2:00 pm, the allied artillery, consisting of around thirty pieces of ordnance commanded by General Alexander Hamilton, began a cannonade, although according to a Royalist eyewitness:

... this was only a shewing of their teeth, for after 4 shots made them give over & in Marston corn feilds [sic] fall to singing psalms..."

At about 5:00 pm, the firing ceased. Meanwhile, at about 4:00 pm, the Royalist contingent from York belatedly arrived, led by Eythin. Rupert and Eythin already knew and disliked one another. Both had fought at the Battle of Vlotho in 1638, where Rupert had been captured and held prisoner for several years. Rupert blamed Eythin's caution for the defeat on that occasion, while Eythin blamed Rupert's rashness. On the Moor, Eythin criticised Rupert's dispositions as being drawn up too close to the enemy. His main concern was that a fold in the ground (referred to by some eyewitnesses as a "glen") between the ridge on which the allied forces were drawn up and the track between Long Marston and Tockwith concealed the front line of the allied infantry from both view and artillery fire, allowing them to attack suddenly from a comparatively close distance. When Rupert proposed to either attack or move his army back as Eythin suggested, Eythin then pontificated that it was too late in the day for such a move. The Royalist army prepared to settle down for the night, close to the allied armies.

=== Deployment ===
==== Covenanters and Parliamentarians ====
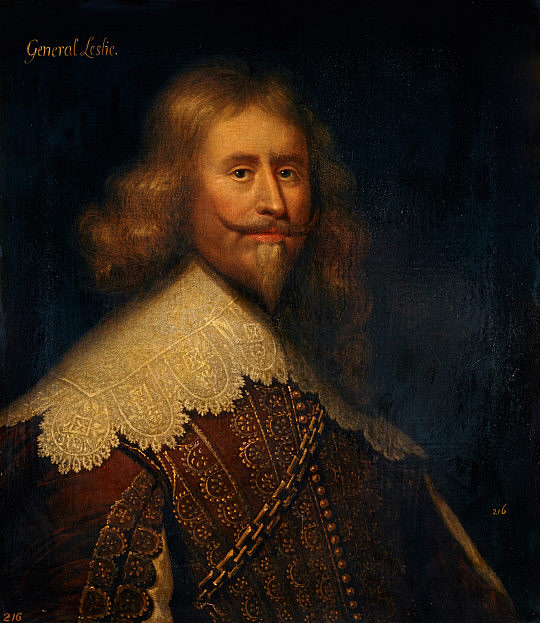
Alexander Leslie, 1st Earl of Leven (1580–1661) – Leven commanded the Covenanter and Parliamentarian armies.

The Covenanters and Parliamentarians occupied Marston Hill, a low feature (actually part of a terminal moraine) less than 100 ft (30 m) above the surrounding countryside but nevertheless prominent in the flat Vale of York, between the villages of Long Marston and Tockwith. They had the advantage of the higher ground, but cornfields stretching between the two villages hampered their deployment.

At some point in the day, the Royalists attempted to seize a rabbit warren to the west of the cornfields from where they might enfilade the Parliamentarian position, but they were driven off and the Parliamentarian left wing of horse occupied the ground. The wing was under the command of Manchester's Lieutenant General, Oliver Cromwell. The first two lines consisted of over 3,000 cavalry from the Eastern Association, including Cromwell's own double-strength regiment of ironsides. They were deployed in eleven divisions of three or four troops of cavalry each, with 600 "commanded" musketeers deployed as platoons between them. The use of musketeers to disrupt attacking cavalry or dragoons was a common practice in the Swedish Army during the Thirty Years' War, and was adopted by both the Parliamentarians and Royalists at Marston Moor. Three regiments of Covenanter horse, numbering 1,000 and mounted on lighter "nags", formed a third line to Cromwell's rear under Sir David Leslie. Five hundred Scottish dragoons under Colonel Hugh Fraser were deployed on the extreme left.

The centre, under the direction of the Earl of Leven as nominated commander in chief, consisted of over 14,000 foot, with 30 to 40 pieces of artillery. Thomas Stockdale recorded the disposition of the troops and the role of Leven in drawing up the order of battle:

The Yorkeshire forces strengthened with a great party of the Scotts army hauing the main battle, the Earl of Manchester’s forces the left wing, and the Scotts the right wing, each battle hauing severall reserues and winged with horse, according to Generall Lesleys direction whose great experience did worthyly challenge the prime power in ordering them (Note: Stockdale, quoted.)

The Covenanter Sergeant Major General of Foot, James Lumsden, nevertheless observed (in a note on the map he made of the allied army's dispositions) that "... the Brigads drawen up heir as we [illegible] it is not so formal as it ought to be."

Most of Manchester's infantry under Sergeant Major General Lawrence Crawford were on the left of the front line. A brigade of Lord Fairfax's foot was in the centre. Two Covenanter brigades each of two regiments, the "vanguard" of the main battalia commanded by Lieutenant General William Baillie, made up the right of the front line. The second line consisted of four Covenanter brigades, their "main battle", commanded by Lumsden. There is confusion as to the disposition of the third line and of the infantry deployment on the right wing, as the only map (Lumsden's) is badly damaged. The usual interpretation, based on Peter Young's reconstruction, is that the third line contained two or three Covenanter brigades and the Earl of Manchester's own regiment of foot. Young placed the main body of Fairfax's foot on the left of the third line, although more recent interpretations of accounts put them on the right of the third line or even behind the cavalry of the right wing. An unbrigaded Covenanter regiment may have formed an incomplete fourth line. There were a total of nineteen Covenanter regiments of foot, some of them incomplete, present at the battle. (Note: These units are detailed in Murdoch & Grosjean.) (Note: The most complete discussion of the command structure and number of men in each is found in Furgol.)

The right wing was commanded by Sir Thomas Fairfax, with John Lambert as his second in command. He had at least 2,000 horse from Yorkshire and Lancashire, deployed in nine divisions, with 600 musketeers posted between them in the same manner as on the left wing. There were also perhaps 500 dragoons. One regiment of Covenanter horse commanded by the Earl of Eglinton was deployed with Fairfax's front line, two more (one of them composed of lancers commanded by the Earl of Balgonie, Leven's son) were deployed behind Fairfax's second line. The second and third lines of the right wing may also have included some units of foot, whose identity is uncertain. (Note: On his map, Lumsden depicted both infantry and dragoons in the same manner.)

==== Royalists ====
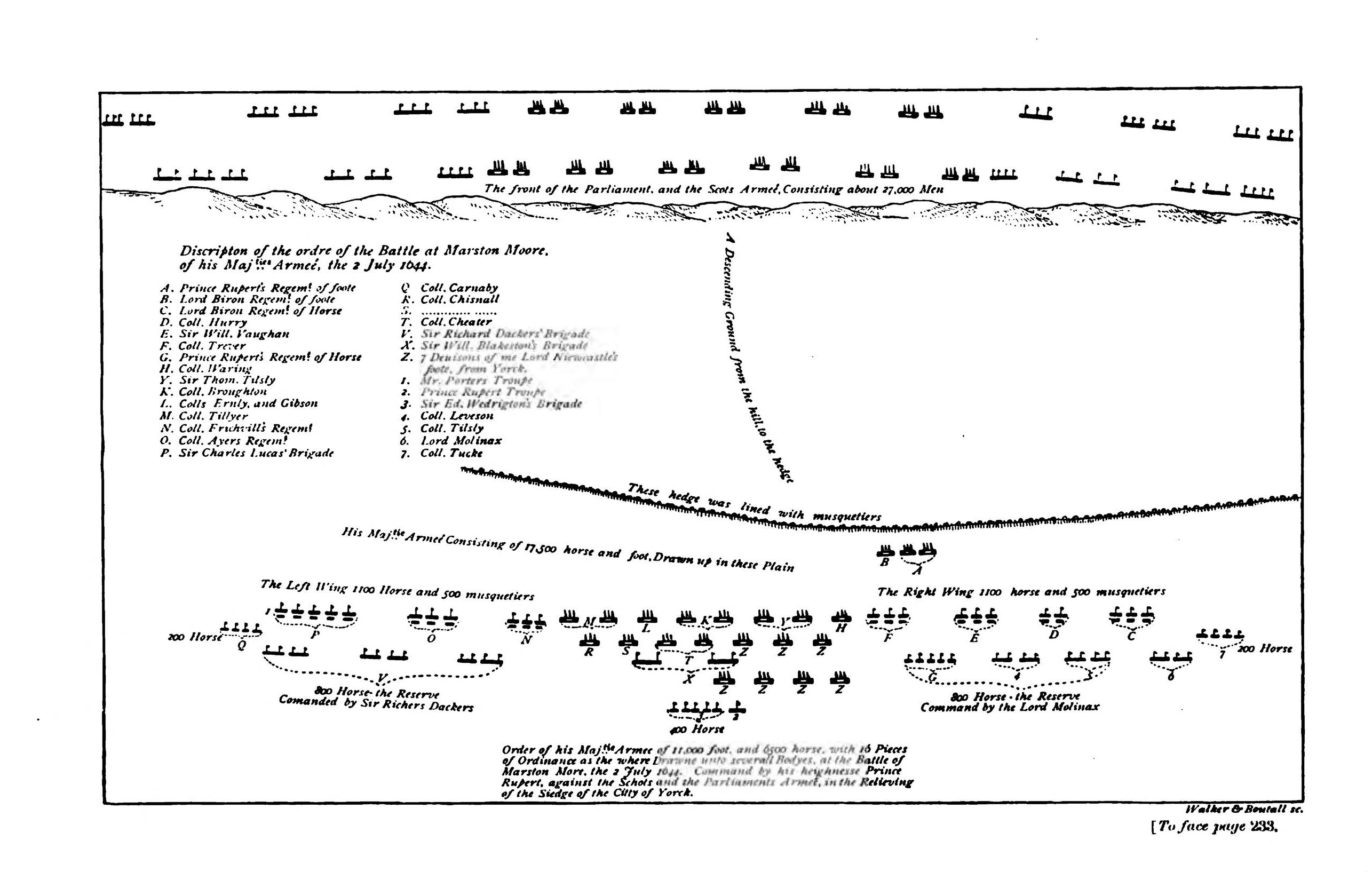
A plan of the Royalist dispositions at Marston Moor, drawn up by Sir Bernard de Gomme

The Royalists occupied the low-lying moor, behind a drainage ditch that Rupert noted as an effective obstacle to a cavalry charge. There is some dispute over the course of the ditch at the time of the battle. Some contemporary accounts support the contention by later historians that it was non-existent on the Royalists' right wing. On the other hand, a near-contemporary plan of the Royalist dispositions by Rupert's chief engineer, Bernard de Gomme, shows the ditch in its present-day alignment. It is generally accepted that the ditch was at least less of an obstacle on the Royalist right.

The Royalist left wing was commanded by Lord Goring. It consisted of 1,700 cavalry from the Marquess of Newcastle's cavalry (the "Northern Horse"), 400 cavalry from Derbyshire and 500 musketeers. The first line was commanded by Goring and the second by Sir Charles Lucas.

Their centre was commanded by Eythin. A brigade numbering 1,500 and consisting of Rupert's and Byron's regiments of foot under Colonel Robert Napier of Byron's regiment was deployed at the ditch, at the junction of the right wing and centre, possibly to protect some artillery which may have occupied a slight hummock near this point or where the ditch was an especially weak obstacle. To their left, a forlorn hope of musketeers lined the ditch. Behind them, the first line and the left wing of the second line were composed of the remaining infantry units of Rupert's army, numbering 5,500, under Rupert's Sergeant Major General, Henry Tillier. The 3,000 infantry from Newcastle's army, organised as seven small "divisions" under Sergeant Major General Francis Mackworth, formed the right wing of the second line and an incomplete third line behind the right centre when they arrived. Some at least of them may not have taken up their assigned positions when the battle began, leaving the right of the Royalist centre understrength. A brigade of 600 "Northern Horse" under Sir William Blakiston was deployed behind the left centre. A total of 14 field guns were deployed in the centre.

The right wing was commanded by Byron, with 2,600 horse (including a regiment, 200 strong, of Northern Horse) and 500 musketeers. The second line, which included Rupert's Regiment of Horse but also some comparatively inexperienced regiments, was commanded by Lord Molyneux, although the experienced but unprincipled Sir John Urry (or "Hurry") was Sergeant Major General of Rupert's horse and therefore Byron's second in command.

Unlike the Covenanters and Parliamentarians, Rupert retained a reserve of 600 cavalry, including his elite Lifeguard of Horse, under his personal command. This reserve was situated behind the centre.

=== Main action ===
Delayed by the late arrival of the York garrison, it was late evening before the Royalists were fully deployed. A flurry of rain showers and the discouragement of Newcastle and Eythin persuaded Rupert to delay his attack until the next day. From the ranks of the allied army he could hear the singing of psalms. As the Royalist troops broke ranks for their supper, Leven noted the lack of preparation among his opponents and ordered his men to attack at or shortly after 7:30 pm, just as a thunderstorm broke out over the moor.

On the allied left, Crawford's infantry outflanked and drove back Napier's brigade while Cromwell's horse quickly defeated Byron's wing. Though Byron had been ordered to stand his ground and rely on the ditch and musket fire to slow and disorganize an enemy attack, he instead ordered a hasty counter-charge which disordered his own troops and prevented his musketeers and four "drakes" (field guns) attached to Napier's brigade from firing for fear of hitting their own cavalry. In the clashes which followed, Byron's front line regiments were put to flight. Cromwell was slightly wounded in the neck, by a pistol ball in most accounts, and briefly left the field to have the wound dressed.

Noting the setback on this flank, Rupert led his reserve towards the right, rallying his own fleeing regiment of horse and leading them in a counter-attack. A Parliamentarian officer wrote:

Cromwell's own division had a hard pull of it; for they were charged by Rupert's bravest men both in front and flank; they stood at the sword's point a pretty while, hacking one another; but at last (it so pleased God) he [Cromwell] brake through them, scattering them before him like a little dust. (Note: Scoutmaster-General Watson to Henry Overton.)

— Scoutmaster-General Watson to Henry Overton

Leslie's Covenanter regiments eventually swung the balance for Cromwell, outflanking and defeating the Royalist cavalry. Rupert's right wing and reserve were routed and he himself narrowly avoided capture by hiding in a nearby bean field.

On the allied right centre, the brigade of Fairfax's infantry and Baillie's "vanguard" initially succeeded in crossing the ditch, capturing at least three pieces of artillery. On the allied right, Sir Thomas Fairfax's wing fared worse. He later wrote:

Our Right Wing had not, all, so good success, by reason of the whins and ditches which we were to pass over before we could get to the Enemy, which put us into great disorder: notwithstanding, I drew up a body of 400 Horse. But because the intervals of Horse, in this Wing only, were lined with Musketeers; which did us much hurt with their shot; I was necessitated to charge them. We were a long time engaged with one another, but at last we routed that part of their Wing ... [I] myself only returned presently, to get to the men I left behind me. But that part of the Enemy which stood, perceiving the disorder they were in, had charged and routed them, before I could get to them. (Note: Sir Thomas Fairfax, quoted.)

— Sir Thomas Fairfax

Fairfax wrote that his second-in-command, Major-General Lambert, could not get up to him, and so charged in another place. A lane, the present-day Atterwith Lane, crossed the ditch on this flank, and some accounts suggest that several units were easy targets for the Royalist musketeers as they advanced along the lane only four abreast. When a small embankment alongside the ditch at this point was removed in the 1960s, several hundred musket balls were recovered.

When Goring launched a counter-charge, the disorganised Parliamentarians were routed, although some of the Covenanter cavalry regiments with Sir Thomas Fairfax's wing, especially the Earl of Eglinton's regiment, resisted stoutly for some time. As an eyewitness observed:

sir Tho. Fairfax his new levied Regiments being in the Van [of the right wing], they wheeled about, & being hotly pursued by the enemy, came back upon the L. Fairfax foot, and the reserve of the Scottish foot, broke them wholly, & trod the most part of them under foot. (Note: Captain William Stewart, quoted.)

— Captain William Stewart

Most of Goring's victorious wing then either scattered in pursuit, or fell out to loot the allied baggage train, but some of them under Lucas wheeled to attack the right flank of the allied infantry. Meanwhile, some of Newcastle's foot counter-attacked the brigade of Fairfax's foot in the centre of the allied front line and threw them into confusion. Following up this advantage, Blakiston's brigade of horse, probably reinforced by the troop of "gentleman volunteers" under Newcastle himself, charged the allied centre. Under Lucas's and Blakiston's assaults in the confusion and the gathering darkness, six of the Covenanter infantry regiments and all of Fairfax's infantry fled the field. The Scottish sergeant major general, Lumsden, on the right of the allied second line, stated that:

These that ran away shew themselves most baselie. I commanding the battel was on the head of your Lordships [Loudoun's] Regiment, and Buccleuch's; but they carried themselves not so I could have wished, neither could I prevaile with them: For these that fled, never came to charge with the enemie, but were so possest with ane pannick fear, that they ran for an example to others, and no enemie following them, which gave the enemie [an opportunity] to charge them, they intended not, &they had only the losse.

— Sir James Lumsden to the Earl of Loudon

One isolated Covenanter brigade of foot that stood its ground was at the right of their front line and consisted of the regiments of the Earl of Crawford-Lindsay and Viscount Maitland. Lucas launched three cavalry charges against them. In the third charge, Lucas's horse was killed, and he was taken prisoner. Behind them, Lumsden reformed the reserve of the allied centre, pushing four regiments (those of the Earl of Cassilis, William Douglas of Kilhead, Lord Coupar and the Earl of Dunfermline) and part of the Clydesdale Regiment forward into the breach in the allied front line. (Note: Lumsden's account) Behind them in turn, the Earl of Manchester's regiment repulsed and scattered Blakiston's brigade.

By now it was nearly fully dark, although the full moon was rising. The countryside for miles around was covered with fugitives from both sides. A messenger from Ireland riding in search of Prince Rupert wrote:

In this horrible distraction did I coast the country; here meeting with a shoal of Scots crying out, 'Weys us, we are all undone'; and so full of lamentation and mourning, as if their day of doom had overtaken them, and from which they knew not whither to fly; and anon I met with a ragged troop reduced to four and a Cornet; by and by with a little foot officer without hat, band, sword, or indeed anything but feet and so much tongue as would serve to enquire the way to the next garrisons, which (to say the truth) were well filled with the stragglers on both sides within a few hours, though they lay distant from the place of the fight 20 or 30 miles. (Note: Mr. Arthur Trevor to the Marquess of Ormonde)

— Mr. Arthur Trevor to the Marquess of Ormonde

Cromwell's disciplined horsemen had rallied behind the right of the original Royalist position. Sir Thomas Fairfax, finding himself alone in the midst of Goring's men, removed the "field sign" (a handkerchief or slip of white paper which identified him as a Parliamentarian) from his hat, and made his way to Cromwell's wing to relate the state of affairs on the allied right flank. Some five or six troops of Fairfax's cavalry and Balgonie's Covenanter regiment of horse (split into two bodies) also made their way through the Royalists to join Cromwell. Cromwell now led his cavalry, with Sir David Leslie still in support and Sergeant Major General Crawford's foot on his right flank, across the battlefield to attack Goring's cavalry.

By this time, Goring's troops were tired and disorganised, and several of his senior officers were prisoners. They nevertheless marched down the hill from the Parliamentarian baggage to occupy roughly the same position which Fairfax's cavalry had held at the start of the battle, which most contemporary accounts stated to be a disadvantageous position. When Cromwell attacked, Goring's outnumbered troops were driven back. Many of them retired to the "glen", the fold of ground beneath Marston Hill, but refused to take any further part in the battle despite the efforts of officers such as Sir Marmaduke Langdale and Sir Philip Monckton to rally them. Eventually, they obeyed orders to retreat to York late at night.

The triumphant allies meanwhile turned against the remains of the Royalist centre, overrunning successive units and cutting down many fugitives. Finally some of Newcastle's foot, the "whitecoats", gathered for a last stand in a ditched enclosure. This has usually been stated to be White Sike Close, in the rear of the Royalists' original position, where some of Newcastle's infantry would have retreated when they found their right flank "in the air" following the defeat of Byron's and Rupert's cavalry, and certainly where some mass burials later took place, although the enclosure may instead have been Fox Covert, a mile north of Long Marston on the natural line of retreat towards York. The whitecoats refused quarter and repulsed constant cavalry charges until infantry and Colonel Hugh Fraser's dragoons were brought up to break their formation with musket fire. The last 30 survivors finally surrendered. (Note: Will Coster speculates that far from it being a voluntary last stand, that the Parliamentarians refused to accept the surrender of many men because they (probably mistakenly) believed the regiment to contain many Roman Catholics.)

=== Casualties ===
Approximately 4,000 Royalist soldiers had been killed, many in the last stand of the whitecoats, and 1,500 captured, including Lucas and Tillier. The Royalists lost all their guns, with many hundreds of weapons and several standards also falling into the hands of the allied forces.

The allied generals' dispatch, and other Parliamentarian accounts, stated that 300 of their soldiers were killed. One of those mortally wounded among the Parliamentarians was Sir Thomas Fairfax's brother, Charles. Another was Cromwell's nephew, Valentine Walton, who was struck by a cannonball early in the day. Cromwell was present when he died afterwards, and wrote a famous letter to the soldier's father, Cromwell's brother-in-law, also named Valentine Walton, which briefly described the battle and then informed the father of the son's last words and death.

== Outcome ==
=== Royalists ===
Late at night, the Royalist generals reached York, with many routed troops and stragglers. The Governor of York, Sir Thomas Glemham, allowed only those who were part of the garrison (in effect, only a few officers who had participated in the battle as volunteers) into the city, in case Parliamentarian cavalry entered the city on the heels of the fleeing Royalists. Many fugitives, including wounded, crowded the streets before Micklegate Bar, the western gate into the city.

Newcastle, having seen his forces broken and having spent his entire fortune in the Royalist cause, resolved that he would not endure the "laughter of the court". He departed for Scarborough on the day after the battle (3 July) and went into exile in Hamburg, with Eythin and many of his senior officers. Two days after the battle, Rupert rallied 5,000 cavalry and a few hundred infantry whom he mounted on spare horses. He considered that rather than attempt to restore Royalist fortunes in the north, he was required to return south to rejoin the King. Leaving York by way of Monk Bar on the north east side, he marched back over the Pennines, making a detour to Richmond to escape interception.

At Marston Moor, Rupert had been decisively beaten for the first time in the war. He was deeply affected by the defeat, and kept the King's ambiguous dispatch close to him for the remainder of his life. He had suffered an additional blow through the death during the battle of his dog "Boye", who had been a constant companion by his side throughout his campaigns. Parliamentarian propaganda made much of this, treating Boye almost as a Devil's familiar.

With the departure of Newcastle and Rupert, the Royalists effectively abandoned the north, except for isolated garrisons, which were reduced one by one over the next few months. The remnants of Byron's troops were driven from Lancashire in August, and were involved in another Royalist disaster at the Relief of Montgomery Castle in Wales in September. The Royalist cavalry from the northern counties, the "Northern Horse", continued to fight for the King under Sir Marmaduke Langdale. They relieved a Royalist garrison at Pontefract Castle in West Yorkshire in February 1645, but their undisciplined and licentious conduct turned many former sympathisers away from the Royalist cause. After being involved in the defeats of the King at the battles of Naseby and Rowton Heath, they made a final attempt to reach Scotland and were routed at the Battle of Sherburn in Elmet in October 1645.

The nearby Church of St Helen’s in Bilton-in-Ainsty is thought to have been used a hospital for soldiers. A satirical drawing of a snake with a crown on the door of the Church is thought to have been done by a Royalist being held there.

=== Allies ===
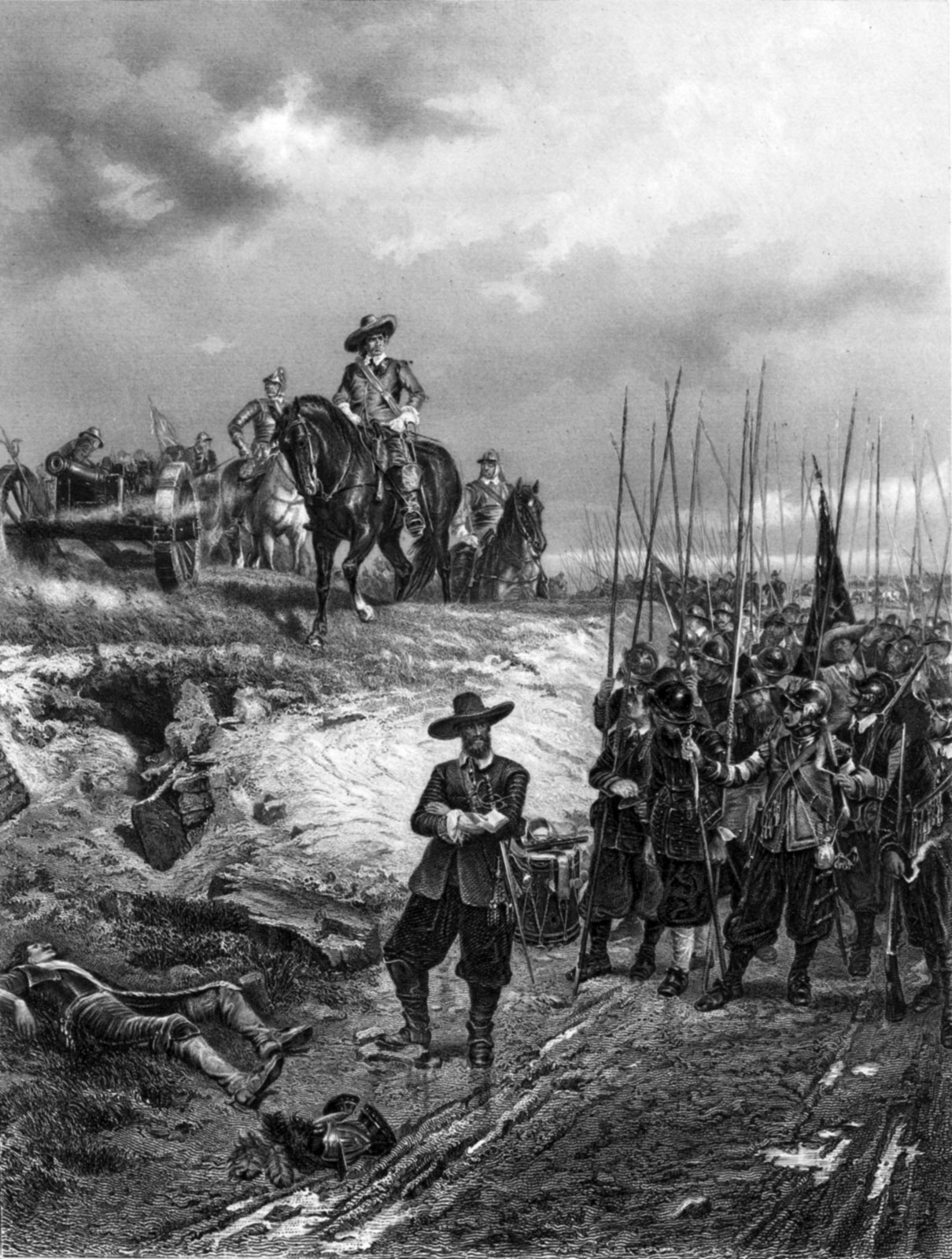
Oliver Cromwell (1599-1658) at the Battle of Marston Moor. Cromwell's reputation as an effective cavalry commander and leader was cemented by his success at Marston Moor.

The victorious allies regrouped, although too slowly to intercept Rupert as he left York. Once the allied army had reformed (and had been joined by Meldrum's and Denbigh's forces) they resumed the siege of York. Without hope of relief, and under the agreement that no Scottish soldiers were to be quartered in the city, the garrison surrendered on honourable terms on 16 July.

Once York surrendered, the allied army soon dispersed. Leven took his troops north to besiege Newcastle upon Tyne and Carlisle. He sent dispatches to Scotland ordering that all runaways from the Covenanter regiments which broke at Marston Moor be returned, but not before every tenth deserter was hanged according to article 14 of Leven's Articles of War. Once reunited with the Army of both Kingdoms, the remnants of the six broken regiments were put to base service such as latrine duties and the disposing of corpses until they got the chance to redeem themselves during the storm of Newcastle. Manchester's army returned to Lincolnshire and eventually moved into the south of England to take part in the Second Battle of Newbury.

The Earl of Leven had again demonstrated the importance of disciplined infantry. Even as some of the newly levied allied regiments were routed by the Royalists, he had ensured he had enough veterans in reserve to replace them and overturn the early gains made by his opponents. Cromwell's reputation as a cavalry commander was also firmly established at this battle. Despite attempts by his political rivals such as Denzil Holles and military critics such as Major General Lawrence Crawford to belittle the part he played, it was acknowledged that the discipline he had instilled into his troops and his own leadership on the battlefield had been crucial to the victory. Cromwell would later declare that Marston Moor was "an absolute victory obtained by God's blessing". From this moment, he was to exert increasing influence both in the House of Commons and in the Parliamentarian armies in the field.

However, the accounts published after the battle showed the rifts which were already growing between the moderates and Presbyterians on the one hand and the Independents on the other. The noted Scottish theologian Robert Baillie wrote from Edinburgh only a few days later to one of his Independent brethren:

We were both grieved and angry, that your Independents there should have sent up Major Harrison to trumpet over all the city their own praises, to our prejudice, making all believe, that Cromwell alone, with his unspeakable valorous regiments, had done all that service: that most of us fled: and who stayed they fought so and so, as it might be. We were much vexed with these reports, against which yow were not pleased, any of yow to instruct us with any ansuer, till Lindesay's letters came at last, and captain Stewart with his collors. Then we sent abroad our printed relations, and could lift up our face. But within three days Mr Ashe's relation was also printed, who gives us many good words, but gives much more to Cromwell than we are informed is his due … See by this inclosed, if the whole victorie both in the right and left wing, be not ascribed to Cromwell, and not a word of David Lesley, who in all places that day was his leader. (Note: Baillie 1841, vol. 2, p. 209. "Baillie to Blair", 18 July 1644 quoted.)

==== Conduct of the allied generals ====
Much of the resulting many-sided dispute among the Parliamentarians and Covenanters was prompted by accounts very soon after the battle that all three allied generals-in-chief had fled the field. The Earl of Manchester left the field but he subsequently rallied some infantry and returned, although he was able to exercise little control over events.

By some accounts, Lord Fairfax and Leven also fled the battlefield with their routed troops, but this has recently been challenged, certainly in Leven's case. The most detailed account of Leven's flight was written by the biographer of Lieutenant Colonel James Somerville, who was present at the battle as a volunteer. (Note: NB. Young made the error of thinking the account was written by Somerville himself.) However, this second-hand account was published only in 1679, and has been challenged by previously unused eyewitness accounts. These show most of the Covenanter infantry and cavalry units remained fighting until the end of the battle. As seven different eyewitnesses attested, they did so under the direction of Leven. For example, Simeon Ashe (the Earl of Manchester's chaplain) noted that:

The Earl of Manchester's new levied Forces began to give backe, the Enemey pursued our men, fell on again and gained two peeces of ordnance there; Rupert fell upon Sir Thomas Fairfaxes horse, and there was a very hot fight, many slayne on both sides: our forces retreated, but ralleing our men again and General Lessly coming on with his foot, they fell on furiously, many were killed on both sides, and then the enemy beginning to retreat, our men followed pursuing and totally Routed Rupert.

The enigmatic English reporter, "T. M.", agreed that Leven still commanded the centre battalia after the initial rout:

The Lord of Hosts did so strike up the hearts of the three Noble Generals [that God] took boldness and courage unto them, gathering up those Horse Forces that were left into a body to assist those English and Scotts that stood to it, and set upon them, as David with his small Army upon the numerous company of the Amalekites, while they were rejoicing over their spoils, and smote them until the evening.

== Fiction and media ==
In 1971 the British rock band Electric Light Orchestra released an album track titled "The Battle of Marston Moor (July 2nd 1644)".

== Sources ==
- Baillie, Robert (1841). Laing, D (ed.). The Letters and Journals of Robert Baillie, Principal of the University of Glasgow MDCXXXVII–MDCLXII (3 vols ed.). Edinburgh.
- Historic England (2020). "Battle of Marston Moor 1644 (1000020)". National Heritage List for England.
- Carte, T., ed. (1739). "Letter: Arthur Trevor to Lieutenant-General, The Marquis of Ormonde 10 July 1644". Collection of Letters. Vol. 1. p. 56.
- Churchill, Winston (1974). A History of the English-speaking Peoples. Vol. 2. The New World. London: Cassell. p. 186. ISBN 0-304-29501-9.
- Coster, Will (1999). "Massacre and Codes of Conduct in English Civil War". In Levene, Mark; Roberts, Penny (eds.). The Massacre in History. New York: Berghahn Books. ISBN 9781571819352.
- Dodds, Glen Lyndon (1996). Battles in Britain, 1066–1746. Arms and Armour.
- Fraser, Antonia (1973). Cromwell the Lord Protector. New York: Primus. ISBN 0-917657-90-X.
- Furgol, Edward (1990). A Regimental History of the Covenanting Armies, 1639-1651. Edinburgh: J. Donald Publishers. ISBN 9780859761949.
- Kenyon, John (1988). The Civil Wars of England. Weidenfeld and Nicolson. ISBN 0-297-79351-9.
- Murdoch, Steve; Grosjean, Alexia (2014). Alexander Leslie and the Scottish Generals of the Thirty Years' War, 1618–1648. Pickering and Chatto. ISBN 978-1-84893-467-2.
- Newman, P.R; Roberts, P.R. (2003). Marston Moor 1644: The Battle of the Five Armies. Pickering: Blackthorn. ISBN 0-9540535-2-4.
- Plant, David. "Sir Marmaduke Langdale, 1st Baron Langdale, c.1598–1661". British Civil Wars and Commonwealth Web Site. Archived from the original on 27 September 2007.
- Regan, Geoffrey (1987). Someone had blundered. London: B.T. Batsford. ISBN 0-7134-5008-8.
- Royle, Trevor (2004). Civil War: The Wars of the Three Kingdoms 1638–1660. London: Abacus. ISBN 0-349-11564-8.
- Tincey, John (2003). Marston Moor 1644: The Beginning of the End. campaign. Vol. 119. Osprey Publishing. ISBN 978-1-84176-334-7.
- Warburton, Eliot (2003). Memoirs of Prince Rupert and the Cavaliers. Vol. 2. London. ISBN 978-1-4212-4940-7.
- Woolrych, Austin (1961). Battles of the English Civil War. London: B.T. Batsford Ltd.
- Young, Peter (1970). Marston Moor 1644: The Campaign and the Battle. Kineton: Roundwood. ISBN 1-900624-09-5.
- Young, Peter; Holmes, Richard (2000). The English Civil War. Ware: Wordsworth Editions. ISBN 1-84022-222-0.
