= Annie Keary =

English poet and children's author (1825–1879)

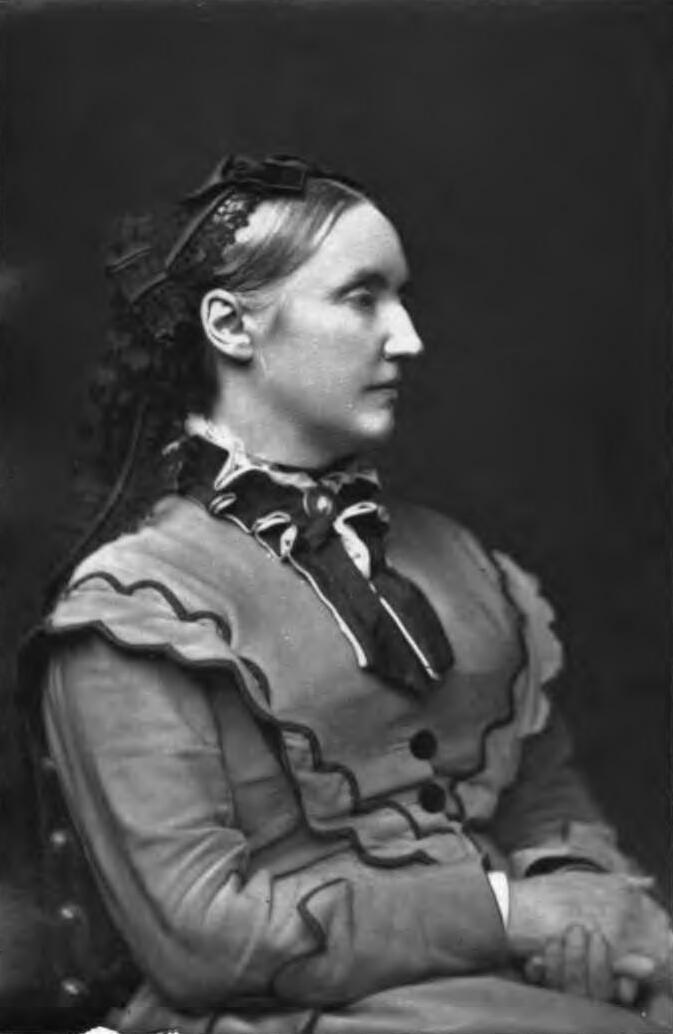
A portrait of Keary, taken from the 1882 edition of the Memoir of Annie Keary by Eliza Keary

Keary's signature

Anna Maria (Annie) Keary (3 March 1825 – 3 March 1879) was an English novelist, poet and an innovative children's writer.

== Life ==
Annie Keary was born at the rectory in Bilton, now Bilton-in-Ainsty, Yorkshire, the daughter of a former army chaplain, William Keary from County Galway in Ireland, and his wife, Lucy Plumer, of Bilton Hall. She was educated at home, as she suffered from poor health and slight deafness. In 1843, her father became incumbent of Sculcoates, near Hull, and simultaneously of Nunnington in North Yorkshire, where the family moved. Two years later, her father's declining health called for another move to Clifton near Bristol. Their relationship was close and her father gave her much information about Ireland that she later incorporated into her novels.

Keary went in 1848 to keep house for a widowed brother with three children, in the semi-rural Trent Vale of north Staffordshire. Six happy years ended when her brother remarried. Soon after, she lost two other brothers and her own long engagement was broken off. Annie's sister Eliza (see below) wrote a memoir after Annie's death in Eastbourne in 1879. This was followed in 1883 by a volume of Annie's letters. The memoir tells how Eliza accompanied the frail Annie to Egypt after her bereavements and disappointment in love, then to Cannes for research for her books, where the healthy climate agreed with her and she spent much time in later years.

The sisters helped to run a home for unemployed servant girls in Pimlico, London. They were befriended by the novelist Charles Kingsley and his family. More strongly religious after her trip to Egypt, the dominant side of Annie's life became her family ties. She nursed her mother in her last illness in 1869 and later looked after four young cousins, whose parents were in India.

== Works ==
Annie Keary's first children's book appeared in 1856, a year after her father died. Success as a novelist came with Sidney Grey: A Tale of School Life (1857), which drew local colour from the grimy brick kilns on the edge of Trent Vale. The Rival Kings (1858) broke new ground for a children's book in featuring rival children's gangs and their hatred for each other. Her third book, The Heroes of Asgard: Tales from Scandinavian Mythology (1857), was the first of four in collaboration with her sister Eliza. It retells the Norse myths for children. Keary continued to write children's and educational books, for instance a well-regarded survey of Early Egyptian History (1861) and an accessible account of various Biblical nations, The Nations Around (1870).

Annie Keary branched out in 1859 into adult fiction with Through the Shadows (1859), but literary acclaim had to wait until her novel Castle Daly: The Story of an Irish Home Thirty Years Ago (1875), which was reprinted several times up to the end of the 1880s. It covers the Great Famine and the Young Irelanders' Uprising, and was serialized initially in Macmillan's Magazine. A facsimile of the 1886 edition of it appeared in Volume 5 of Irish Women's Writing, 1838–1888. It was said to delineate perceptively "the strong and weak points of Saxon and Celtic character".

Oldbury (1869) is a novel set in the little town where she was raised. Keary's final novel, A Doubting Heart (1879), was completed by a friend, Mrs K. Macquoid. Like her earlier work for adults, it shows signs of being stretched to fill the three volumes required by publishers in those days, although the characterizations and sense of place are strong.

Her original fairy-tales appeared in Little Wanderlin, and other fairy tales (1865), written with her sister Eliza. Another long fairy-tale entitled "Through the Wood" is told in the middle of a late sequel to her best-selling Sidney Grey novel: Sidney Grey: A Year from Home (1876). This differs strongly from the short "Through the Wood" story in Little Wanderlin. Her collaborator Eliza later wrote the fantasy novel The Magic Valley (1877), which also has fairy-tale elements It was issued in abridged form as part of a schools series, in about 1912, along with poetic adaptations of Annie Keary's fairy tales.

She also wrote poetry and collaborated with her sister Eliza and their niece Maud on Enchanted Tulips and Other Verses for Children, but this seems not to have been published until 1914. A decade later came a small collection from Macmillan: Little Wanderlin, Little Silver Ear, The Magic Valley: And Poems of Childhood (1924).

== Eliza Harriett Keary (1827–1918) ==
Apart from her collaborations with Annie Keary and her memoir of her, Eliza wrote poetry. Her Little Seal-Skin and Other Poems (1874) was poorly reviewed at the time, but has received attention since: Ellis calls her "a strikingly promising and important female poetic voice that was tragically muted." She also wrote children's fiction, including The Magic Valley, or, Patient Antoine (1877), At Home Again (1886), and Pets and Playmates (1887). She died in Torquay in 1918. Her nephew Charles Francis Keary (1848–1917), was also an acclaimed author of both realist and weird fiction, and a cataloguer for numismatic studies.
