= Bilton-in-Ainsty with Bickerton =

Civil parish in North Yorkshire, England

Coordinates: 53.950°N 1.302°W

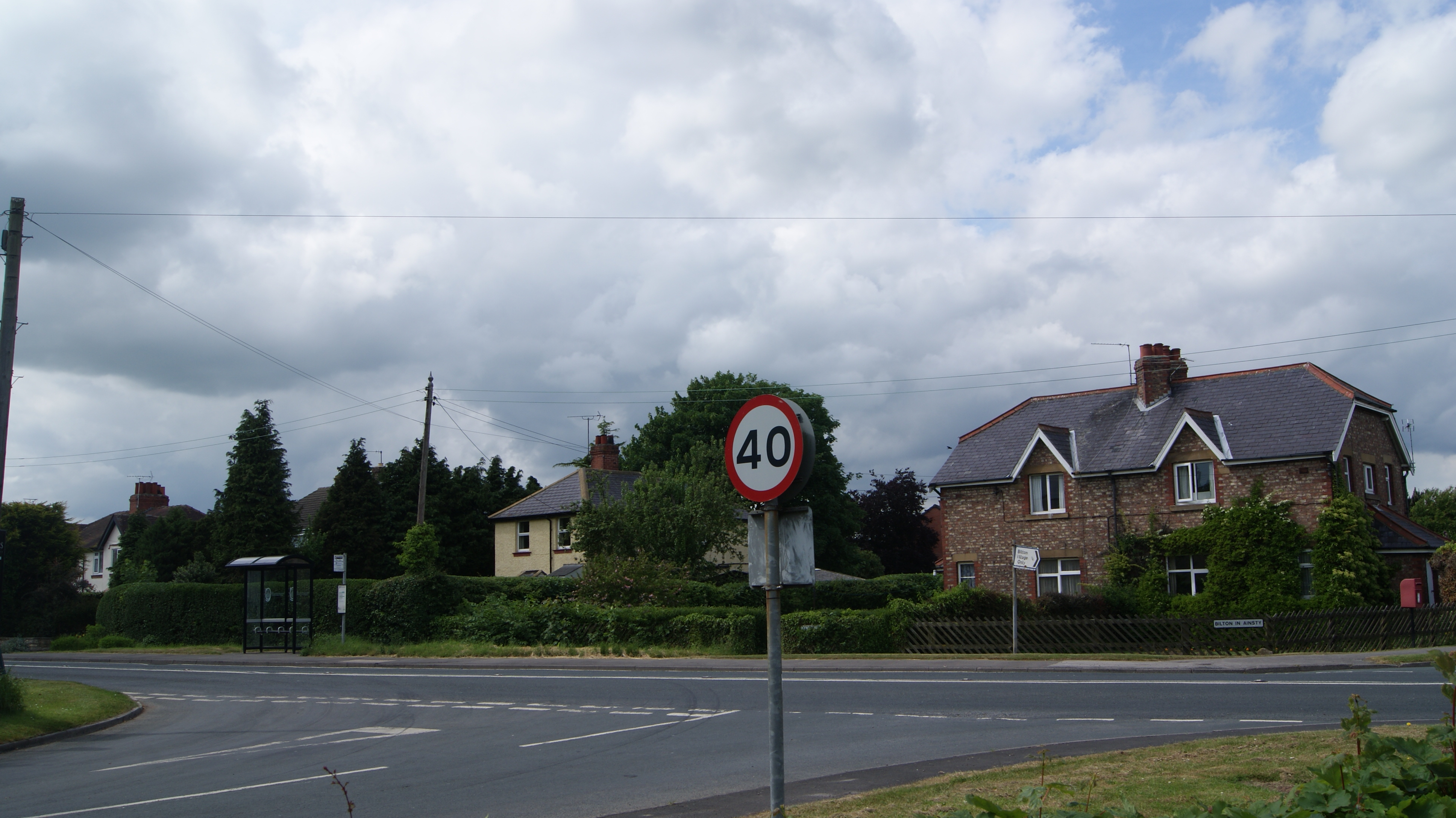
Bilton-in-Ainsty, road near the church

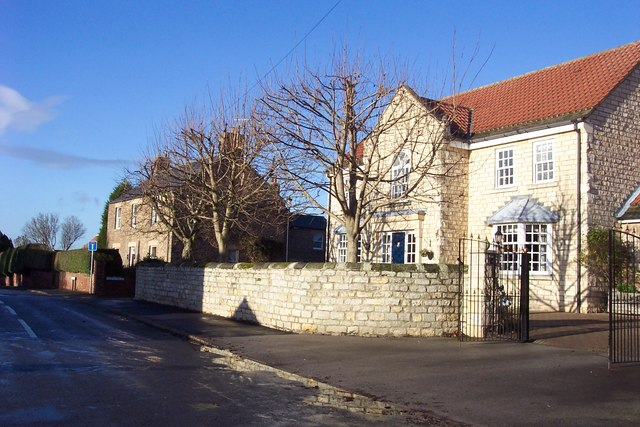
Houses in Bickerton

Bilton-in-Ainsty with Bickerton is a civil parish in the county of North Yorkshire, England. According to the 2001 census it had a population of 512, reducing to 463 at the 2011 Census.

The parish contains Bilton-in-Ainsty and Bickerton, which are about three miles east of Wetherby in West Yorkshire.

Until 1974 it was part of the West Riding of Yorkshire. From 1974 to 2023 it was part of the Borough of Harrogate, it is now administered by the unitary North Yorkshire Council.

== See also ==
- Listed buildings in Bilton-in-Ainsty with Bickerton
