= Ainsty Bounds Walk =

Long distance walk in Yorkshire, England

Coordinates: 53°53′06″N 1°15′36″W

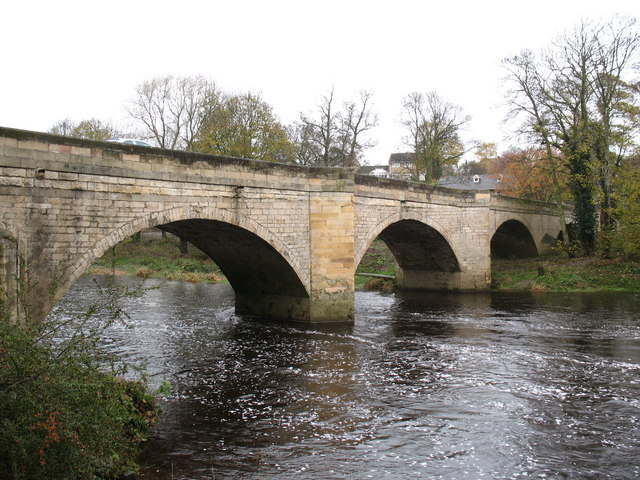
- The River Wharfe at Boston Spa on the route
- Length: 44 mi (71 km)
- Location: North & West Yorkshire, England
- Trailheads: Circular, based on Tadcaster
- Use: Hiking

The Ainsty Bounds Walk is a 44-mile (71 km) long-distance footpath mostly in North Yorkshire, England, with a short section in West Yorkshire. It follows the boundaries of the ancient wapentake of The Ainsty, between the rivers Wharfe, Nidd and Ouse, and passes through the towns of Boston Spa, Wetherby, Moor Monkton, the outskirts of York, and Bolton Percy. As a circular walk it can be walked from any point, but it is considered to start and finish at Tadcaster.
