= Moor Monkton =

Village and civil parish in North Yorkshire, England

Coordinates: 54.005545°N 1.226645°W

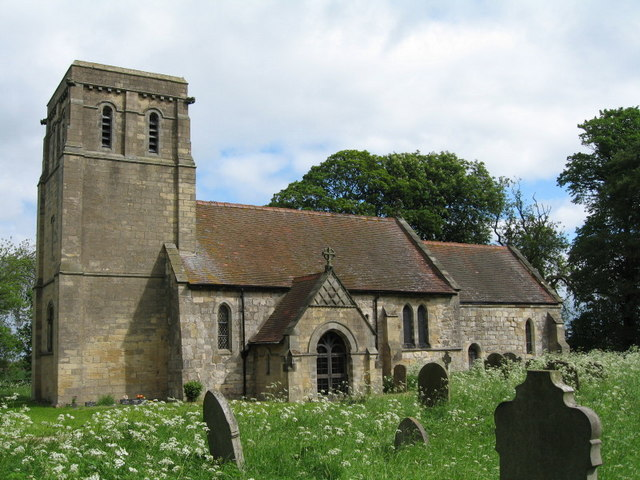
- All Saints' Church, Moor Monkton

- Location within North Yorkshire
- Population: 348 (2011 census)
- OS grid reference: SE507568
  - London: 175 mi (282 km) S
- Civil parish: Moor Monkton
- Unitary authority: North Yorkshire
- Ceremonial county: North Yorkshire
- Region: Yorkshire and the Humber
- Country: England
- Sovereign state: United Kingdom
- Post town: YORK
- Postcode district: YO26
- Dialling code: 01904
- Police: North Yorkshire
- Fire: North Yorkshire
- Ambulance: Yorkshire
- UK Parliament: Wetherby and Easingwold

Moor Monkton is a village and civil parish in the county of North Yorkshire, England. It is situated on the River Nidd and 7 miles (11 km) north-west from York city centre.

== History ==
Moor Monkton is mentioned in the Domesday Book of 1086 as a small settlement belonging to Richard son of Herfast. The name of Moor, was added to the name Monkton to distinguish it from Nun Monkton, which is over the other side of the River Nidd. The name Monkton, which has been recorded variously as Munechatun, Monketon super Moram, Munketun, and Moore Monkton, means the town of the monks. Historically, the village was in the Wapentake of Ainsty, which meant that it was in the West Riding of Yorkshire. The village is one of the waypoints on the 44-mile (71 km) Ainsty Bounds Walk that covers the old boundaries of the Ainsty. From 1974 to 2023 it was part of the Borough of Harrogate, it is now administered by the unitary North Yorkshire Council.

The manor of Moor Monkton was originally owned by the Ughtred family from about the 13th century. It has also been owned by the Neville family and the Earls of Salisbury in the 15th century and eventually the Slingsby family. Sir Francis Slingsby bought the estates from the Seymour family about 1560.

The original seat for the manor was "Rede House" situated to the west of the village. It was a moated building that had been crenellated in the 14th century by Sir Thomas Ughtred. The modern Red House lies 50m south east of this site and was built around 1607 to replace the old house.

The Red House School Chapel in Hall Lane is a Grade II listed building. An early 17th century chapel, that was consecrated in 1618, is a brick built building with a slate roof.

== Geography ==
Geographically, the village is at the end of a road that spurs some 1.2 miles (2 km) north from the A59 road. The River Nidd is to the immediate north, with the River Ouse to the east. The village used to have a railway link at the Marston Moor railway station on the Harrogate Line, though this station closed in 1958. The nearest railway stations now are at Hammerton and Poppleton. Buses call at the crossroads with the A59, south of the village, twice a day, running between Ripon and York.

== Demography ==
=== Population ===
Year	1831	1881	1891	1901	1911	1921	1931	1951	1961
Total	484	249	232	207	227	229	207	192	152

== Religion ==
The parish church, dedicated to All Saints, dates in part from the 12th century. It was restored in 1879 by James Fowler, who probably added the chancel east window, and one at the south of the nave.

== Notable people ==
- James Hampton (1721–1778), Rector and author
- John Shepherd (1765–1848), jockey
- Henry Yeoman (1816–1897), Rector
- Cyril Lemprière (1870–1939), head master and rugby player

== See also ==
- Listed buildings in Moor Monkton
