= Syningthwaite Priory =

Former religious house in Yorkshire, England

Coordinates: 53°55′56.8″N 1°17′54.5″W

Syningthwaite Priory was a priory in Bilton-in-Ainsty in North Yorkshire, England, the refectory of which has been converted into a farmhouse.

Syningthwaite is the site of the Cistercian convent of St Mary, founded c. 1150–1160 by Bertram Haget and suppressed in 1535, having been heavily in debt in the early 16th century. At the Dissolution the priory housed nine nuns, the prioress, eight servants and other labourers. The priory site is enclosed by a moat and includes a Chapel Garth.

The refectory range of the priory survives as the rear range of a farmhouse. The rest of the building is post-Mediaeval, and the front range dates from the early 19th century. It is built of limestone with some brick, and has a roof of pantile at the rear and grey slate on the front range. There are two storeys, a front range of three bays and a three-bay wing at the rear. The front range has a central doorway with a fanlight, and sash windows with splayed voussoirs. In the rear wing is a round-arched doorway with a chamfered surround, colonettes with weathered capitals, leaf motifs in the moulded spandrels, and a hood mould with carved stops. The windows include a three-light mullioned window with Tudor arched lights and a hood mould, sash windows, a horizontally-sliding sash, and a fire window.

== See also ==
- Grade I listed buildings in North Yorkshire
- Listed buildings in Bilton-in-Ainsty with Bickerton
