= Bickerton, North Yorkshire =

Village in North Yorkshire, England

Coordinates: 53.94937°N 1.31406°W

Bickerton
- Village
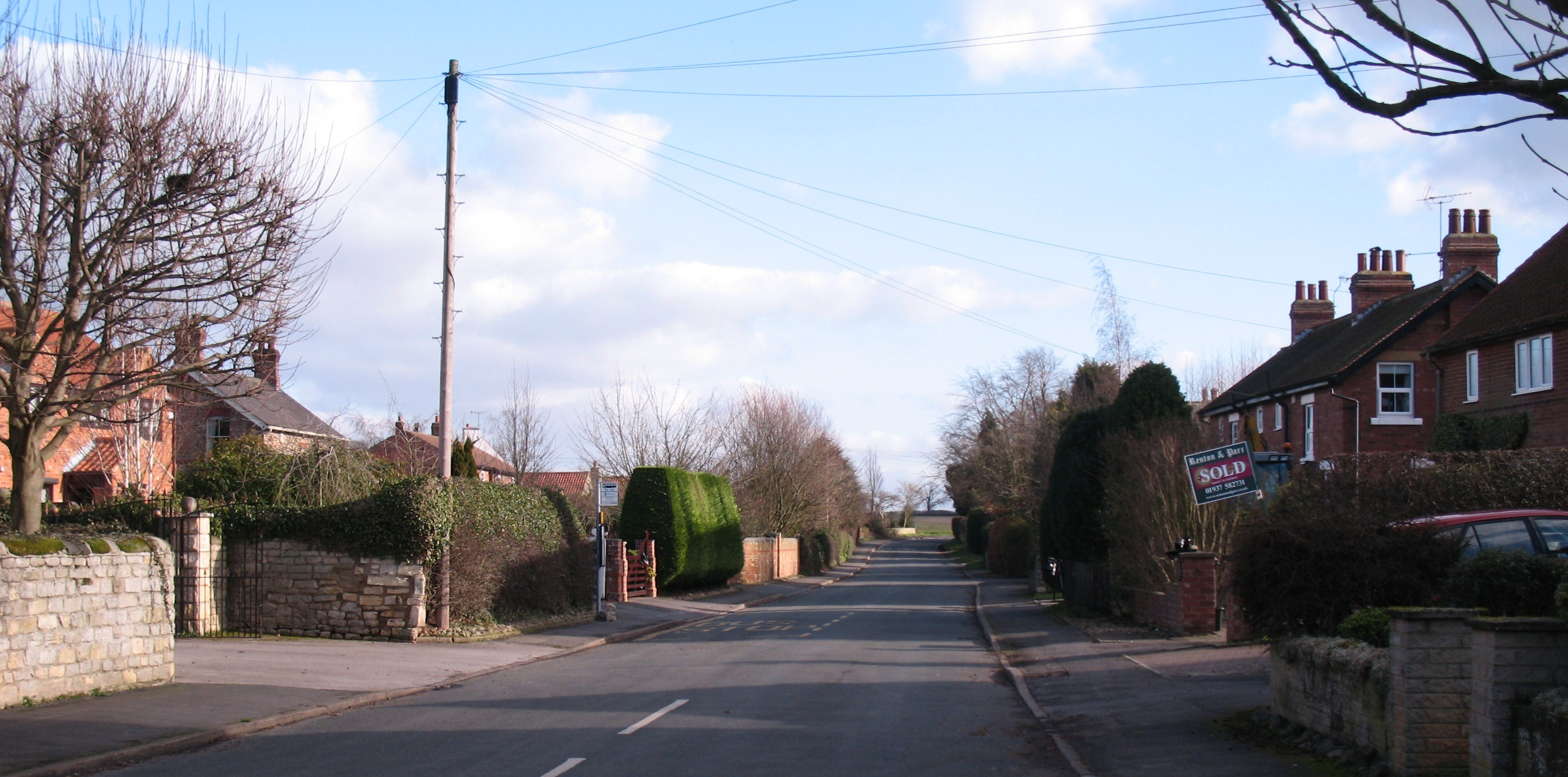
- Main Street in Bickerton

- Location within North Yorkshire
- OS grid reference: SE450506
- Civil parish: Bilton-in-Ainsty with Bickerton
- Unitary authority: North Yorkshire
- Ceremonial county: North Yorkshire
- Region: Yorkshire and the Humber
- Country: England
- Sovereign state: United Kingdom
- Post town: WETHERBY
- Postcode district: LS22
- Dialling code: 01423
- Police: North Yorkshire
- Fire: North Yorkshire
- Ambulance: Yorkshire
- UK Parliament: Wetherby and Easingwold

Bickerton is a village on the B1224 road, in the civil parish of Bilton-in-Ainsty with Bickerton, in North Yorkshire, England. The nearest town is Wetherby. There is a plantation nearby called Bickerton Plantation.

== History ==
Bickerton is mentioned in the Domesday Book as belonging to Gospatric and having four villagers. The name of the village derives from the Old English of bīcere and tūn; the town of the bee-keepers. Historically, the village was in the wapentake of Ainsty, in what was the West Riding of Yorkshire. It is some 9 miles (14 km) west of York, and 3.75 miles (6.04 km) north-east of Wetherby. The road to the immediate south of the village was part of the Bickerton and Rufforth Turnpike trust, and in the 1820s, Bickerton was a stop on the coaching route between Leeds and York. The modern day designation of the road is the B1224, which runs between York and Wetherby.

Bickerton was formerly a township in the parish of Bilton, in 1866 Bickerton became a separate civil parish, on 1 April 1937 the parish was abolished and merged with Bilton. In 1931 the parish had a population of 140.

From 1974 to 2023 it was part of the Borough of Harrogate, it is now administered by the unitary North Yorkshire Council.

== See also ==
- Listed buildings in Bilton-in-Ainsty with Bickerton
