= Red House, Moor Monkton =

Chapel in North Yorkshire, England

Coordinates: 54.0071°N 1.1936°W

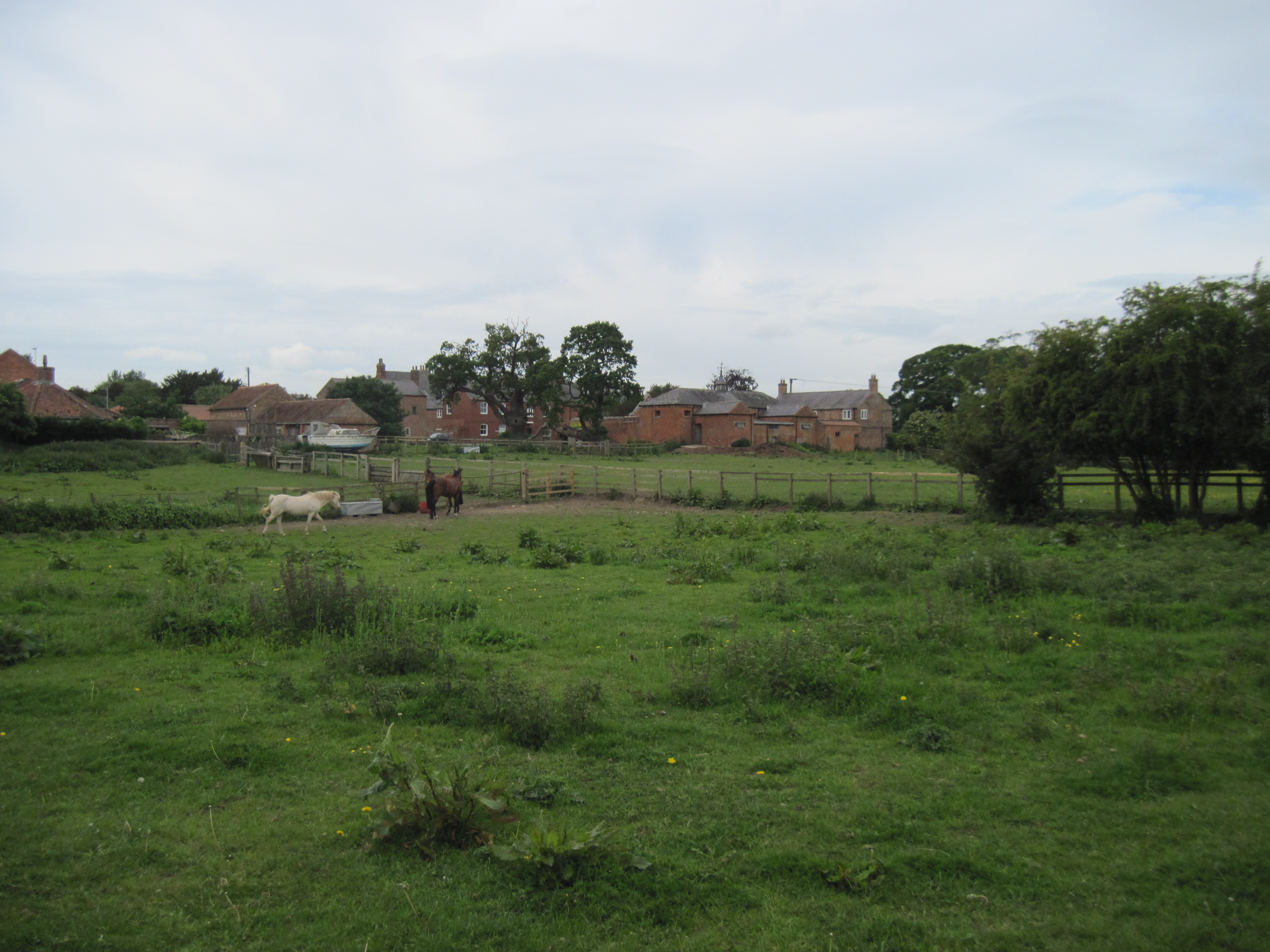
The Red House estate seen from the River Ouse

The Red House is a historic building in Moor Monkton, north-west of York in England.

== History ==
The first Red House was constructed before 1342, when Thomas Ughtred was given licence to crenellate. This was almost certainly located inside a moat which survives as an earthwork, 50 metres north-west of the present house. The estate was sold to the Seymour family in 1523, and then in 1560 to Sir Francis Slingsby. In 1607, the house was owned by Henry Slingsby, who built a new property of the same name, with outbuildings including a chapel, which survives. The house had a deer park, and a walled garden, some features of which may survive.

Slingsby's son, Harry, led the Royalist defence of the Siege of York. Charles I of Great Britain is said to have stayed in the house for a night in 1633, and James II of Great Britain dined there in 1665, while he was Duke of York.

Slingsby's house was largely rebuilt in 1864; the main facade was switched from the north front, overlooking the River Ouse, to the south, with new stables and service buildings added to the north of the house. It became a preparatory school in 1902, which closed in 2001 due to falling enrollment. The property was then converted to an equestrian centre, caravan site, and bed and breakfast. In the 1990s, the house was used for filming some episodes of The Darling Buds of May.

== Architecture ==
The house is built of brick, with stone dressings and a slate roof. It is two storeys high, with attics, and eight bays wide, with four of the bays extending further forward and having gables. Inside, the central bedroom retains 18th century panelling, and the cornice in the living room and some door frames are of similar date. Other fittings date from the 1864 reconstruction or later. The house was grade II listed in 1987.

The chapel was consecrated in 1618. Like the house, it is built of brick, with stone dressings. It is two storeys high and three bays long. The west end has a round-headed doorway with an original panelled door. Above it is an inscription, "Pro termino vitae sic non nobis". Inside, original features include the pulpit, bench ends, pews, ante-chapel screen, and consoles which support the gallery. The staircase to the gallery was originally the main staircase in the house. The chapel was grade II* listed in 1952.

== See also ==
- Grade II* listed buildings in North Yorkshire (district)
- Listed buildings in Moor Monkton
