= All Saints' Church, Moor Monkton =

Anglican church in North Yorkshire, England

Coordinates: 53°59′52″N 1°13′19″W

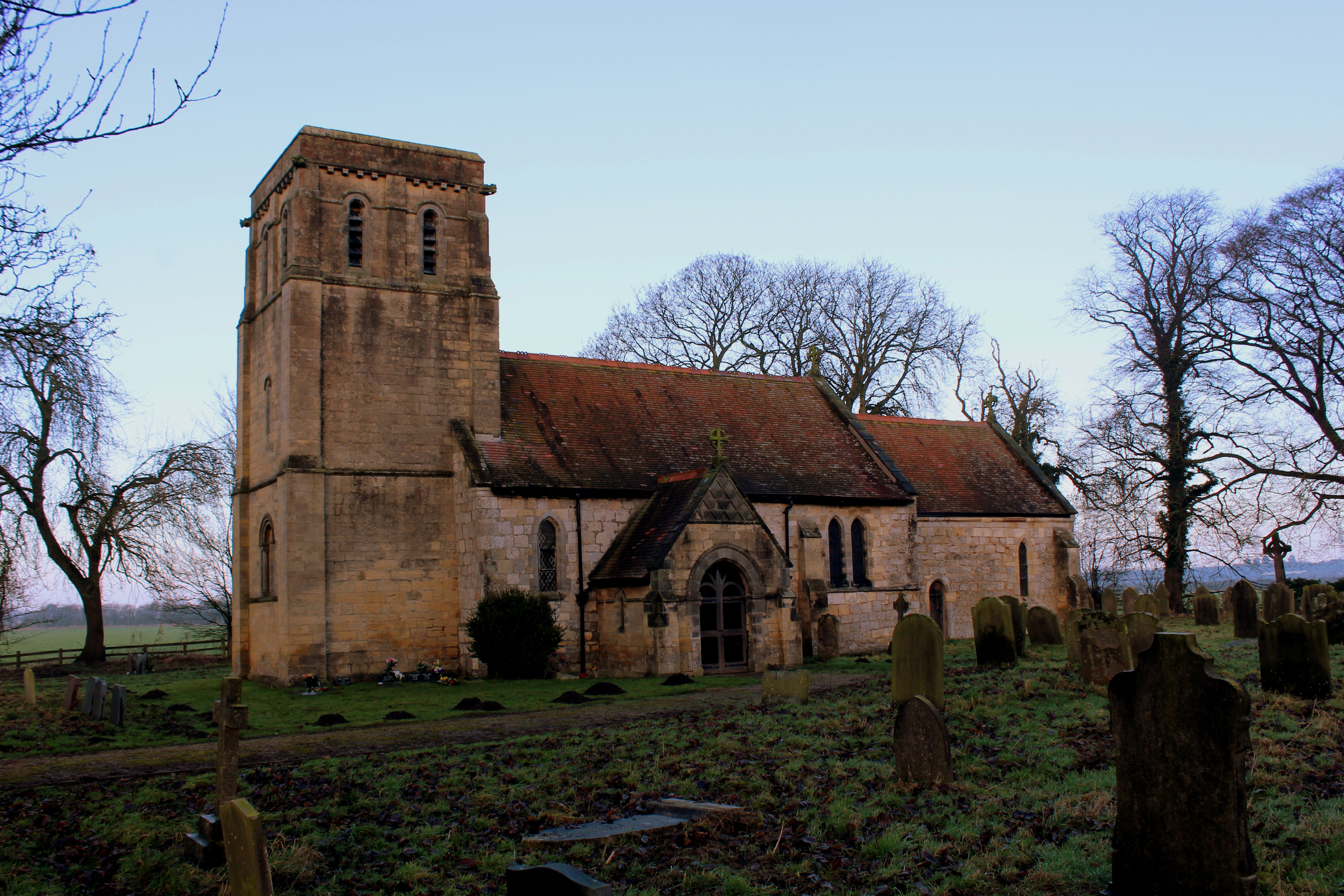
South-west view of the church in 2017

All Saints' Church is the parish church of Moor Monkton, a village north-west of York in England.

The church dates from the 12th century, when the nave and chancel were constructed. From this period survives some of the stonework, the two south doorways, two windows in the north wall, and the lower part of the chancel arch. The church was largely rebuilt in 1638 by Sir Henry Slingsby, who added a brick tower. In 1879, the church was heavily restored by James Fowler, who replaced the tower, and removed most of the furnishings and stained glass.

The church was Grade II* listed in 1966. Lying a mile south of the village of Moor Monkton, it was lit only by candles, oil and gas lamps until 2009, when it was finally connected to the electric grid.

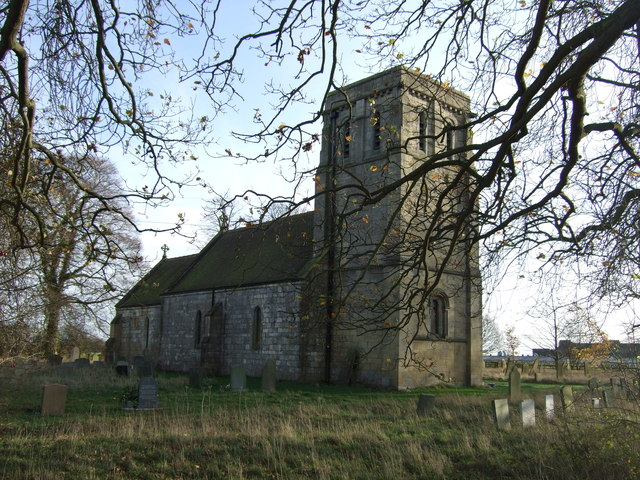
North-west view of the church in 2011

The church is built of sandstone and gritstone, with a tile roof. The nave is of four bays, and the chancel of three. The tower has three stages and full-height buttresses. There is a parapet, with gargoyles in the form of animal heads. Built into the porch is a slab which depicts the head and feet of a priest. Inside, there is a small figure with a missing head, and an 18th century memorial showing a figure on a bier.

== See also ==
- Grade II* listed churches in North Yorkshire (district)
- Listed buildings in Moor Monkton
