= Hessay =

Village and civil parish in North Yorkshire, England

Coordinates: 53.97370°N 1.20292°W

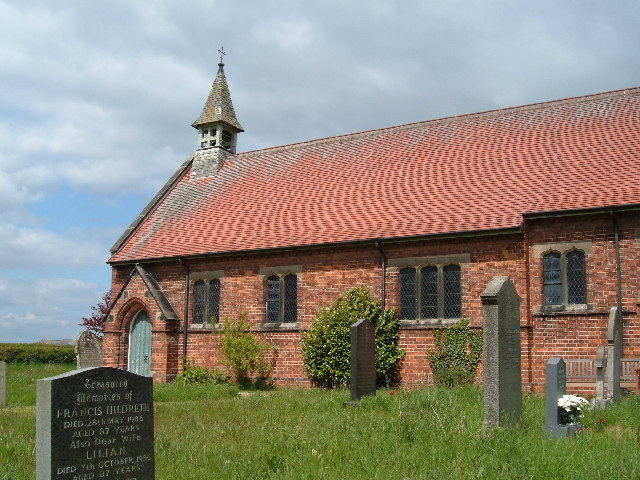
- St Johns Baptist Church

- Location within North Yorkshire
- Population: 300 (2011)
- OS grid reference: SE523533
- Civil parish: Hessay
- Unitary authority: City of York
- Ceremonial county: North Yorkshire
- Region: Yorkshire and the Humber
- Country: England
- Sovereign state: United Kingdom
- Post town: YORK
- Postcode district: YO26
- Dialling code: 01904
- Police: North Yorkshire
- Fire: North Yorkshire
- Ambulance: Yorkshire
- UK Parliament: York Outer

Hessay is a village and civil parish in the unitary authority area of the City of York, in the ceremonial county of North Yorkshire, England 4.7 miles (7.5 km) west of York.

== History ==
The rural village of Hessay enjoys a peaceful open setting within the Vale of York, a glacial plane created in the last ice age.

To the east, York Minster is visible from New Road. To the west, RAF Menwith Hill is visible. To the north, both the Kilburn White Horse and Bilsdale Television mast, some 25 miles (40 km) away, may be seen during darkness.

The name Shirbutt Lane is derived from Shire Butts, from the days that the village was a jousting Location, and it is still possible on occasion to recognise the location of the jousting butts.

Hessay is described in the Domesday Book at Hesdesai, the lake where the hazels grew.

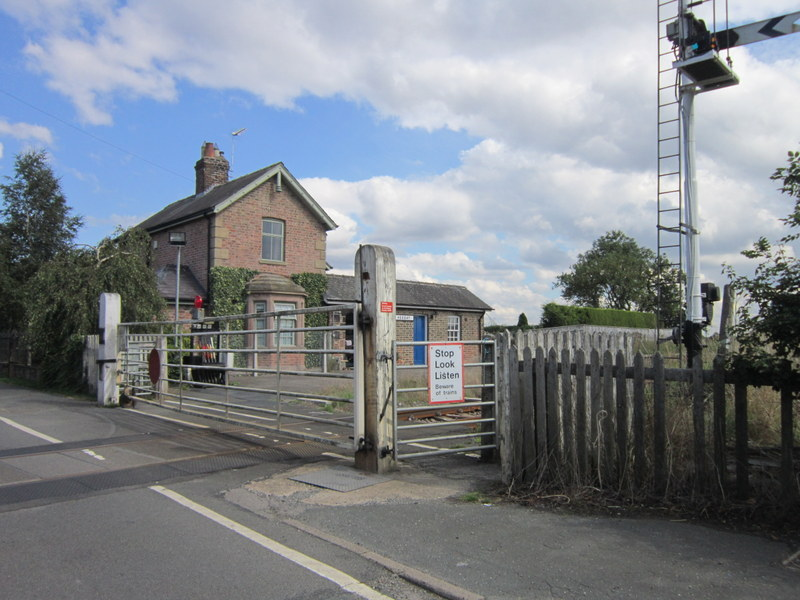
The former Hessay railway station

Hessay used to have a railway station on the Harrogate Line. The station closed to passengers in 1958, but the Ministry of Defence sidings at Hessay were open until 1991 with closure of the unit effected by March 1996.

The village was historically part of the West Riding of Yorkshire until 1974. It was then a part of the Borough of Harrogate in North Yorkshire from 1974 until 1996. Since 1996, it has been part of the City of York unitary authority.

According to the 2001 census, the parish had a population of 181, increasing to 265 at the 2011 Census. Before 1996 it had been part of the Harrogate district. Recent developments have increased the population to over 300 though the actual figure is not known. There are approximately ninety houses in Hessay.

== Churches ==
Although the village has no pub, no post office and no shop, it has two fine churches - the Anglican St John the Baptist's Church and the Methodist church. The village was given to the St Mary's Abbey, York by Osbern de Archis and continued in their possession until The Dissolution.

== Railway station ==
From 1849 to 1964 the village was served by Hessay railway station on the Harrogate line.

== Centre of Yorkshire ==
In February 2012 the parish of Hessay was deduced to be at the geographical centre of Yorkshire by Ordnance Survey. However, four years earlier, the honour was bestowed upon Cattal further west, with the ash tree at Barkston Ash also being pointed out as being the centre of Yorkshire.

== Wildlife ==
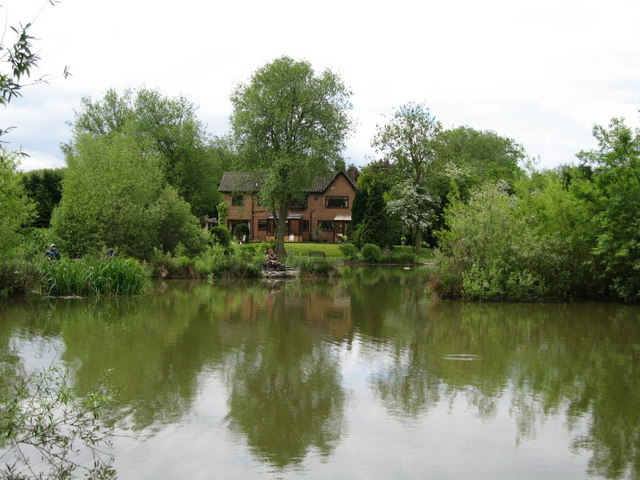
The Willows

Hessay boasts an abundance of wildlife, Notable bird species include Barn Owls, Tawny Owls, Little Owls, Great Spotted Woodpecker, Skylarks, Green Plover (Lapwing), Oyster Catchers, Jays, Rooks, Magpies, Carrion Crow. From the population of small mammals which includes Field, Wood and Harvest Mice, Voles and Shrews, supports the upper end of the food chain of Merlins, Kestrels, Red Kites, Buzzards, Hobby, Sparrow Hawks, Goshawks, a Peregrine falcon has even been seen to take prey from the surrounding farmland. There is a small but increasing murmuration of Starlings which are believed to roost at the west end of Hessay Industrial Estate. Curlew Field Farm takes its name from the Curlews which nest in the Vicinity. Kingfishers and Grey Herons visit the many small ponds in the Parish which are home to newts and salamanders. There are many garden birds such as, blue tits, long tailed tits, great tits, Blackbirds, Song and Mistle Thrush, Robins wrens Tree and House Sparrows. The cuckoo can be heard calling in April and May.

Bats roost in a number of buildings and trees in the village.
