= James Berry (major-general) =

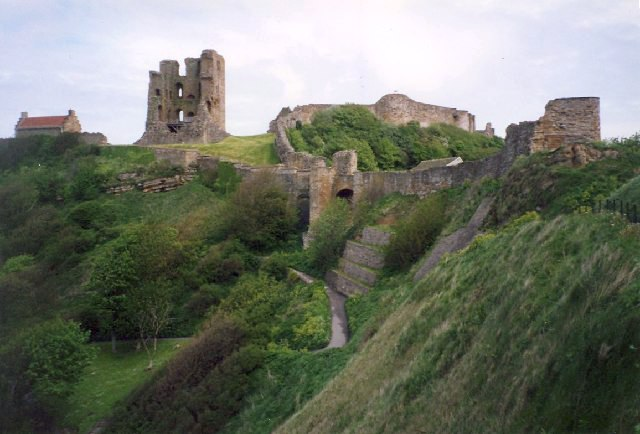
- Scarborough Castle, where Berry was imprisoned from 1660 until his release in 1672

Member of Parliament for Worcestershire
- In office September 1656 – February 1658

Rule of the Major-Generals, responsible for Herefordshire, Worcestershire, Shropshire and Wales
- In office November 1655 – January 1657

Personal details
- Born: Unknown Uncertain
- Died: 9 May 1691 Stoke Newington
- Spouse: Mary Berry (died 1681)

Military service
- Rank: Major General
- Battles/wars: Wars of the Three Kingdoms; Battle of Gainsborough; Winceby; Siege of Lincoln; Marston Moor; Second Newbury; Naseby; Langport; Bristol 1645; Torrington; Siege of Oxford; Preston; Inverkeithing; Siege of Dundee; Penruddock uprising

James Berry, died 9 May 1691, was a Clerk from the West Midlands who served with the Parliamentarian army in the Wars of the Three Kingdoms. Characterised by a contemporary and friend as "one of Cromwell's favourites", during the 1655 to 1657 Rule of the Major-Generals, he was administrator for Herefordshire, Worcestershire, Shropshire and Wales.

In this role, Berry's sympathetic treatment of Fifth Monarchists and Quakers, two religious sects many viewed as anarchic revolutionaries, meant he was seen as unreliable by George Monck, architect of the 1660 Stuart Restoration. Arrested in early 1660, he was held in Scarborough Castle until 1672; after his release, he became a Market gardener in Stoke Newington, where he died in 1691.

== Personal details ==
Almost nothing is known of Berry's early life, other than by the 1630s he was employed as a clerk at an Ironworks in the West Midlands. He shared a house in Stourbridge with Richard Baxter (1615–1691), a Presbyterian minister whom he helped win an appointment as schoolmaster in Dudley, and attended his ordination in 1638.

At some point before 1650, he married Mary Berry, who died in 1681; whether they had children is unknown.

== First English Civil War ==
When the First English Civil War began in August 1642, Berry joined Cromwell's original troop, later becoming Captain lieutenant when it formed the core of a full regiment under the commanded by Oliver Cromwell. Later known as the "Ironsides", the regiment was formed in early 1643 as a core part of the Army of the Eastern Association, led by the Earl of Manchester. Along with Berry, several officers from the regiment went on to hold senior positions under the Commonwealth, including William Packer, John Desborough and Edward Whalley.

Berry's first major action was at Gainsborough in July 1643, when he was credited with killing the Royalist commander, Charles Cavendish. During this period, he seems to have become a religious Independent. (Note: In general, conservative Puritans sought to retain the Church of England, "purified" of what they considered Catholic practises, using uniform and highly regulated liturgy. In contrast, Independents supported tolerance of belief for most non-Catholic Christians, and rejected any state religion. This divergence was a major factor in the hostility between English and Scots Presbyterians and Independents like Cromwell) His friend Baxter, who was viewed as a moderate Presbyterian, reportedly refused an invitation to serve the Ironsides as chaplain, allegedly due to his dislike of their religious radicalism. He later described Berry as being "one of Cromwell's favourites".

Key locations mentioned in article

Berry served continuously with Cromwell over the next eighteen months, fighting at Winceby, Lincoln, Marston Moor, and Second Newbury. After the New Model Army was formed in April 1645, Berry and his troop became part of Sir Thomas Fairfax' regiment, which was present at Naseby, Langport, and the storming of Bristol in September 1645. Now a major, in February 1646 Berry took part in the Battle of Torrington, the last major action of the war in the West Country. He and his regiment then joined the Siege of Oxford, just before Charles I surrendered to the Scots Covenanter army in May 1646. The king ordered all remaining Royalist forces to lay down their arms, and Oxford capitulated in June.

== Second English Civil War ==
However, victory resulted in bitter disputes over the post-war political settlement between the New Model Army, led by Fairfax and Cromwell, and the majority of MPs in Parliament. These divisions also impacted the army, and in August 1647 Berry was transferred into a regiment commanded by Colonel Philip Twisleton. The latter had replaced Edward Rossiter, whom the Army Council viewed as politically unreliable.

In April 1648, the Scots joined with English Royalists and disillusioned Parliamentarians to restore Charles I, leading to the Second English Civil War. Berry served with the forces sent north to deal with an invading army of Scots supported by their English allies, and fought at the Battle of Preston in August, a victory which ended serious Royalist resistance. He was chosen to bring news of Preston to Parliament, but shortly afterwards was posted to Scotland, which the New Model occupied for several months before withdrawing. This meant Berry was absent from the proceedings that ended with the Execution of Charles I in January 1649, and establishment of the Commonwealth of England.

== The Commonwealth 1649 to 1660 ==
In October 1659, the reinstated Rump Parliament revoked the commissions of Berry and other officers.

== Sources ==
- Barton, Tony. "Colonel Oliver Cromwell's Regiment of Horse". BCW Project. Archived from the original on 4 February 2023.
- Durston, Christopher (2004). "Berry, James (died 1691)". Oxford Dictionary of National Biography (online ed.). Oxford University Press. doi:10.1093/ref:odnb/2264. (Subscription, Wikipedia Library access or UK public library membership required.)
- Firth, Charles Harding (1899). "The Raising of the Ironsides". Transactions of the Royal Historical Society. New Series. 13. Cambridge University Press: 17–73. doi:10.2307/3678126. JSTOR 3678126.
- Gentles, Ian (2002). Kenyon, John; Ohlmeyer, Jane (eds.). The Civil Wars in England in The Civil Wars; a Military History of England, Scotland and Ireland 1638-1660. OUP. ISBN 978-0192802781.
- Hutton, Ronald (2021). The Making of Oliver Cromwell. Yale University Press. ISBN 978-0300257458.
- Reece, Henry (2013). The Army in Cromwellian England, 1649-1660. OUP. ISBN 978-0198200635.
- Royle, Trevor (2006) [2004]. Civil War: The Wars of the Three Kingdoms 1638–1660. Abacus. ISBN 978-0-349-11564-1.
