= Siege of York =

Siege of the English Civil War (1644)

Coordinates: 53.958°N 1.082°W

- Part of First English Civil War
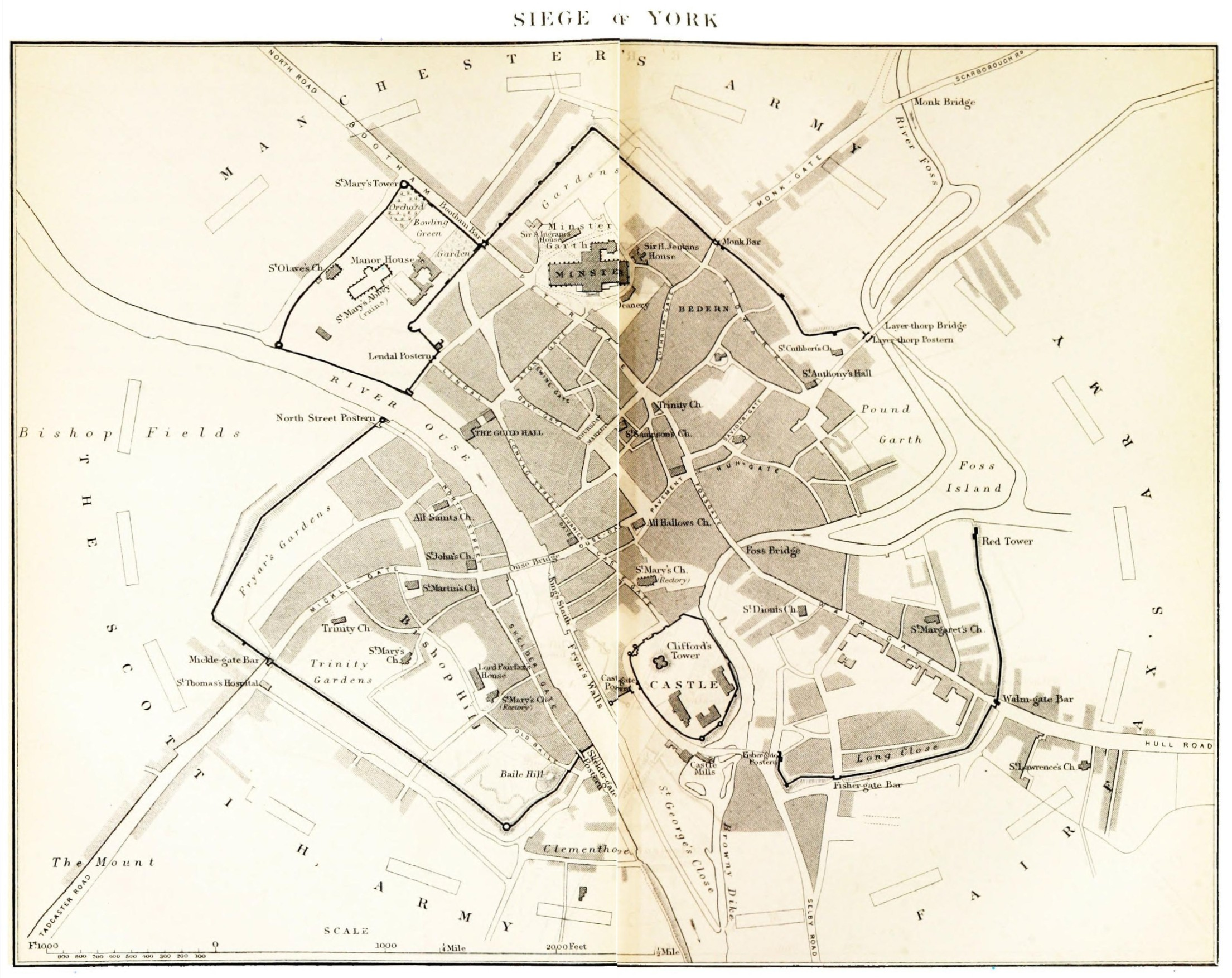
- Map of the siege of York in 1644 (A life of the great Lord Fairfax, 1870 edition)
Date	22 April – 16 July 1644
Location	York, North Yorkshire
Result	Parliamentarian-Covenanter victory

Belligerents
Royalists	Parliamentarians; Covenanters

Commanders and leaders
Marquess of Newcastle; Sir John Belasyse; Sir Thomas Glemham	Earl of Manchester; Lord Fairfax; Earl of Leven

Strength
800 horse 5,000-foot	14,000 + up to 80 guns

Casualties and losses
1,000 killed and wounded 1,000 paroled	Unknown

North Yorkshire and York

The siege of York in 1644 was a prolonged contest for York during the First English Civil War, between the Scottish Covenanter army and the Parliamentarian armies of the Northern Association and Eastern Association, and the Royalist Army under the Marquess of Newcastle. It lasted from 22 April until 1 July when the city was relieved by Prince Rupert of the Rhine. Rupert and Newcastle were defeated the next day at the decisive Battle of Marston Moor, and the siege resumed until the city was surrendered on easy terms on 16 July.

== Campaign ==
=== The first civil war ===
During the 17th century, York was often referred to as the "capital of the north" and sometimes as the "second city in England" (although Bristol had a larger population). It had great prestige as the seat of the Archbishop of York, and as the centre of much of the region's trade.

When civil war broke out in 1642, the Royalists in Yorkshire were briefly besieged in the city, until the Earl of Newcastle (later elevated to marquess) came to their aid with an army from the northern counties.

During the following year, Newcastle defeated the Parliamentarian northern army under Lord Fairfax and his son Sir Thomas Fairfax at the Battle of Adwalton Moor and drove the survivors into Hull. The Royalists laid siege to Hull, but could not prevent Parliament resupplying the city from the sea. An attempt to suborn the governor, Sir John Hotham, was thwarted. Newcastle also sent detachments southward into Lincolnshire, but these were defeated at Gainsborough and Winceby by Parliamentarian cavalry under Oliver Cromwell and Sir Thomas Fairfax.

=== Campaign of 1644 ===
Late in 1643, Parliament signed a treaty, the Solemn League and Covenant, with Scotland. On 19 January 1644, a Scottish army under the Earl of Leven invaded Northumberland. Newcastle took the bulk of his army north to face this new threat, leaving John Belasyse as Governor of York with 1,500 horse and 1,800 foot. Since the autumn of 1643, Sir Thomas Fairfax's cavalry had moved into Cheshire, where they had fought at the Battle of Nantwich. Now, they began moving back across the Pennines into Yorkshire. To prevent them rejoining Lord Fairfax's army in Hull, Belasyse occupied the town of Selby, which lay between them. On 11 April, Thomas Fairfax and Parliamentarian infantry under Sir John Meldrum stormed Selby, capturing Belasyse and most of his army.

On hearing the news, the Marquess of Newcastle realised that York was threatened and hastily retreated there, entering the city on 19 April. The Scots army followed him, and linked up with the Fairfaxes. They moved to the city and appeared before it on 22 April.

== Siege – April to June ==
Newcastle sent most of his cavalry out of the city to join other Royalist armies. Although closely pursued, they escaped. Under Newcastle's Lieutenant General of Horse, Lord Goring, they moved south into Derbyshire and subsequently crossed the Pennines into Lancashire. A garrison of 800 horse and 5,000 foot remained in York under Newcastle and his Lieutenant General of Foot, Lord Eythin.

York lies at the confluence of the River Ouse and the smaller River Foss, and at the time it possessed the only bridges over the Ouse between Selby and Boroughbridge, making investment difficult. The Scots occupied the sector west of the city, the Fairfaxes that to the east. The Foss had been dammed close to its confluence with the Ouse shortly after the Norman Conquest, causing the river behind to form a large lake that protected the northeastern approaches into the city. By the 17th century, however, the lake had begun to silt up to the point that it could have been possible to cross on foot. The Parliamentarians constructed a bridge of boats over the Ouse at Acaster Malbis several miles south of York to allow communications between their two armies. The sector to the north between the Ouse and Foss was left open, except for occasional patrols, and the garrison could easily pass messengers to and fro, and even obtain some victuals via this unguarded sector.

Most of the activity over this period was undertaken by the garrison, who made a sortie to burn down several houses in the nearby village of Acomb (spelled Ackham in contemporary accounts), to deny shelter to the besiegers, and mounted other raids. The besiegers' chief concern during this period was to maintain their lines of communication with Hull, through which they received supplies and especially munitions.

== Siege – June ==
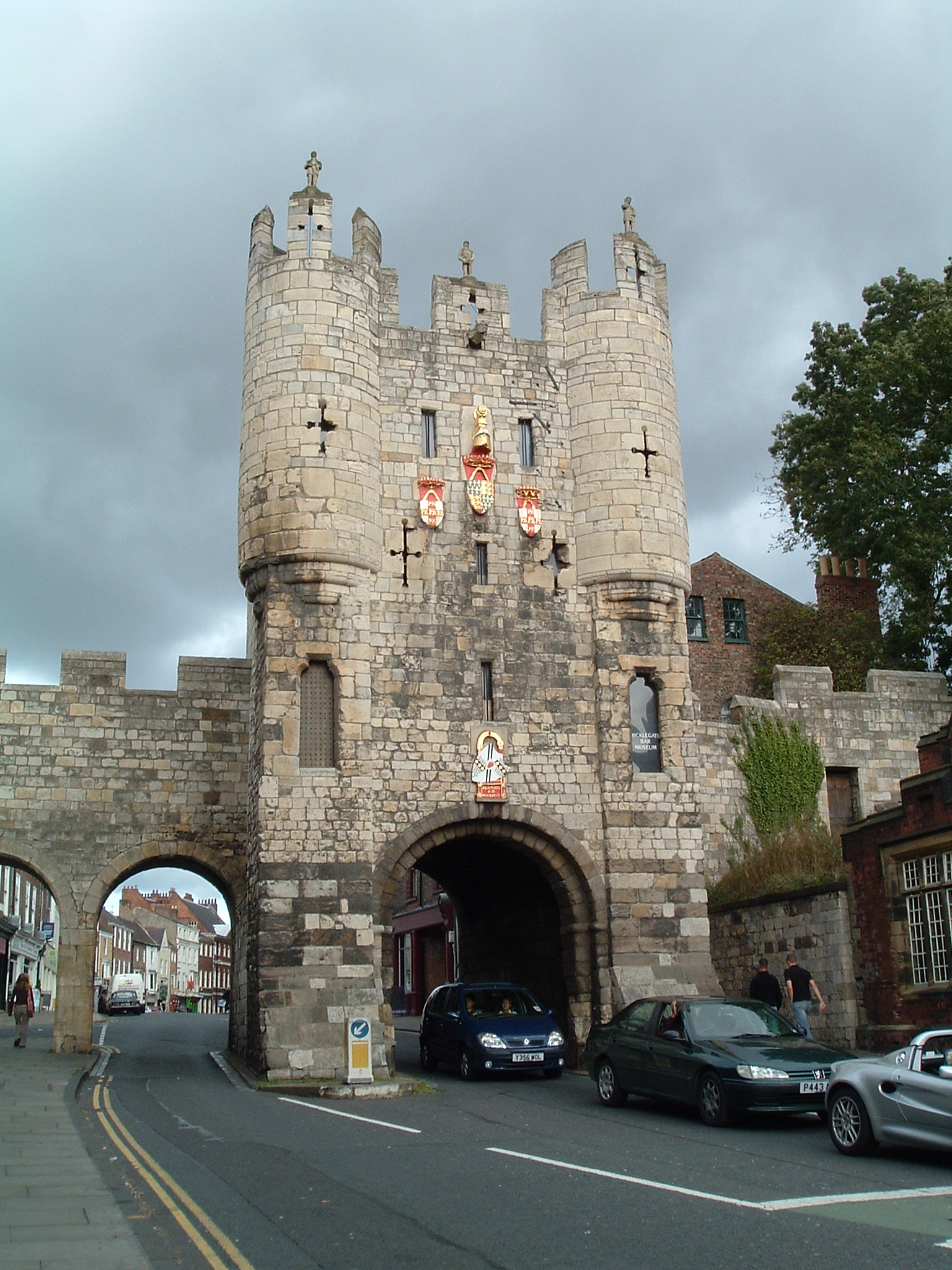
Micklegate Bar and part of the City walls. In 1644, there was a barbican in front of the gate

The Parliamentarian army of the Eastern Association, under the Earl of Manchester had so far played little offensive part in the war. On 6 May, they stormed Lincoln, removing the last Royalist garrison in their area, which allowed them to operate further afield. They moved to join the besiegers of York on 3 June, taking the hitherto unguarded northern sector between the Ouse and Foss. Another bridge of boats was constructed across the Ouse at Poppleton to enable communications between them and the other armies. With the northern sector secure, large numbers of Parliamentarian horse could be spared to clear the area around the city. Several small Royalist garrisons nearby, such as Crayke Castle, were captured.

The besiegers now began determined operations. The city's inner ring of defences consisted of the mediaeval city walls. There was also an outer ring of several "sconces" (small detached earthwork forts, each with a garrison of perhaps a company of infantry and two or three cannon) at a distance from the walls. The Scots stormed two of these in the western sector on 6 June, but failed to capture another at The Mount, half a mile from Micklegate Bar, because reinforcements sallied from the bar to relieve the outwork. (Although the work has long since disappeared and the area has been built upon by hotels and offices, the sconce on the Mount commanded a very wide field of fire). The Royalists then abandoned the remaining outer works.

The besiegers next formally summoned the garrison to surrender. Newcastle opened negotiations for a treaty, but he was probably merely playing for time. Both sides appeared to be acting with bad faith during the parleys, which lasted from 8 to 15 June. On 10 June, parties of Royalist cavalry tried to sortie or to escape the city, but were forced back into York. Meanwhile, the besiegers had been constructing batteries and digging mines.

The English Parliament's Committee of Both Kingdoms had dispatched Sir Henry Vane the Younger as commissioner to the allied armies before York (referred to in the committee's papers as the "Army of Both Kingdoms"). Vane carried instructions to the generals at York to detach forces to resist the Royalists under Prince Rupert of the Rhine, who was threatening to overrun the Parliamentarian-held county of Lancashire. Leven and his commanders had already expressed their opposition to this, and when Vane arrived on 9 June, they maintained their resolve to capture York rather than dissipate their strength in half-measures. Vane (who was also instructed to sound out the allied leaders on their views as to whether King Charles was to be deposed) eventually agreed with the generals' strategy.

=== Storming attempt ===
With the sconce at the Mount still in Royalist hands, the besiegers concentrated their attack on two other sectors. To attack Walmgate Bar, they set up a battery of guns on a nearby rise, Lamel Hill, and also dug a mine beneath the Walmgate Bar barbican. The cannon caused scars in the bar which can be seen today, and ruined St Lawrence Parish Church, the old hospital church of St Nicholas (which was never rebuilt), and many domestic buildings in the area. A deserter warned the Royalists about the mine, and they successfully flooded it through a countermine.

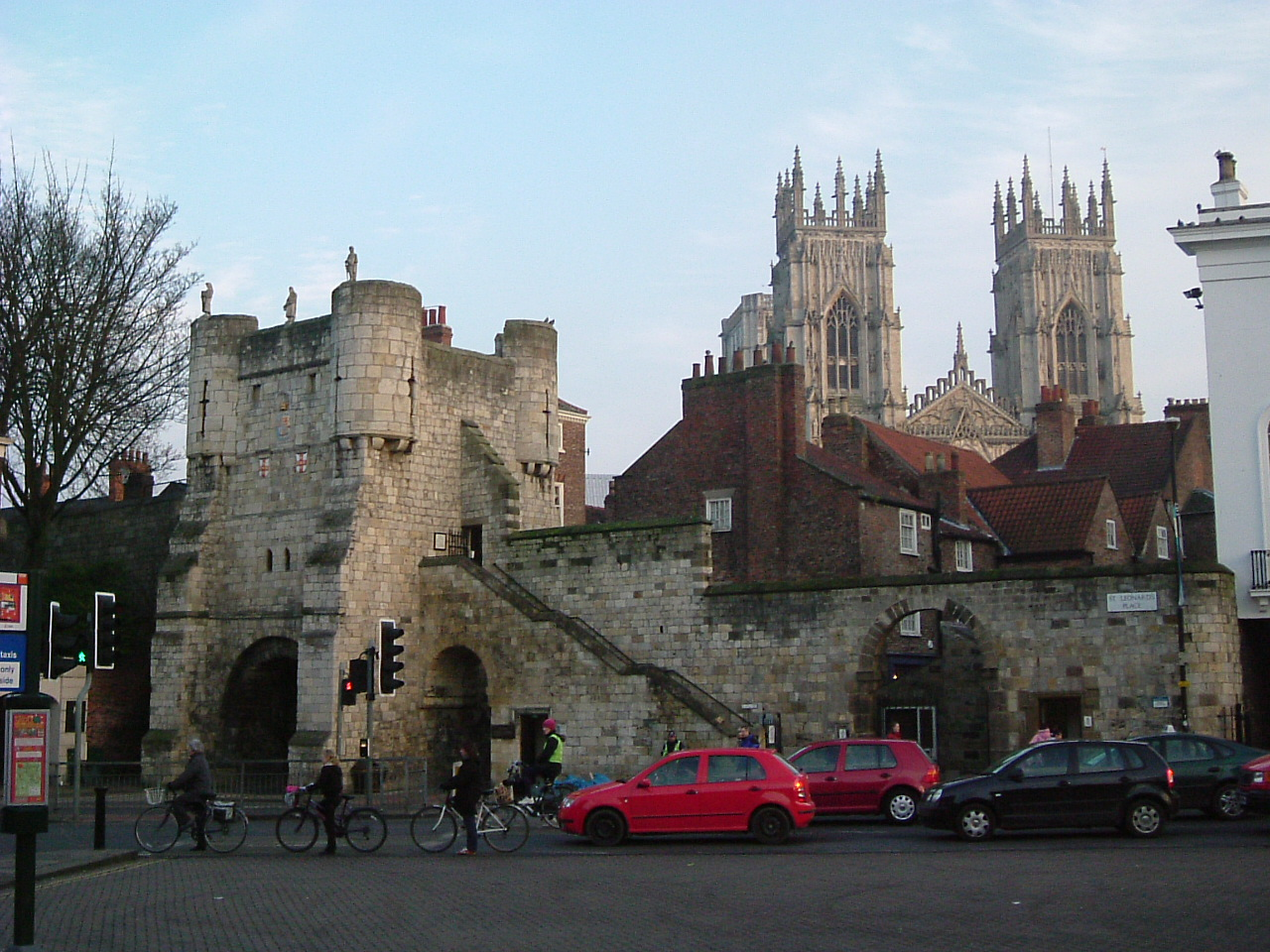
Bootham Bar in the shadow of York Minster

Meanwhile, at Saint Mary's Tower (outside Bootham Bar, on the north-west corner of the walls of the former St Mary's Abbey), Manchester's men had dug another mine. On 16 June, this was fired and the explosion demolished the tower. A regiment of foot stormed the breach, but no reinforcements were available. Some Royalists emerged from the abbey's postern gate by the river and recaptured the breach from behind, trapping the attackers. The Parliamentarians suffered 300 casualties. Manchester's Sergeant-Major General, Lawrence Crawford, was blamed for the rashness which led to the failure. Although the breach was the site of constant bickering between the attackers and the garrison (as the Earl of Manchester wrote, "We are now so near them that we are very ill neighbours one to another"), the Parliamentarians did not renew the assault.

== Relief ==
At around the same time, two armies were approaching. Rupert was gathering a large Royalist army in Lancashire to relieve York. Although reinforcements for the besiegers were coming from the Midlands under Meldrum and the Earl of Denbigh, they could not arrive in time to intercept Rupert. On 28 June the besiegers learned that Rupert was holding a final muster and "fixing arms" at Skipton and on 30 June, they temporarily abandoned the siege and moved to Marston Moor to confront him.

At first the garrison was unaware that the besiegers had departed, but sentries later reported that their Scots and Parliamentarian opposite numbers were no longer answering calls and shouting insults as they usually did. Patrols were sent out from the city, which found the besiegers had left. (There was a brief clash between these patrols and a Parliamentarian rearguard at Fulford). After it became common knowledge within the city that the siege was lifted, Newcastle's men swarmed out from their defences and acquired large amounts of plunder, including cannon, ammunition and 4,000 pairs of shoes, from the abandoned siege lines and encampments.

Meanwhile, Rupert had bypassed the Scots and Parliamentarian armies in a highly successful flanking manoeuvre, and gained touch with the city from the north. Rupert claimed that he had orders from the King which required him to defeat the Scots and Parliamentarians in battle before returning to the south of England, and sent peremptory demands to Newcastle that he reinforce Rupert's army for an immediate battle. This was not possible because Newcastle's troops, who had received no pay for some time, had mutinied and were demanding pay or discharge. Several were still looting, and it was said that some were drunk. Eventually, when Rupert and Newcastle had appealed to them, 3,000 men (with a mounted troop of 100 "gentleman volunteers") rejoined their colours and marched off about midday on 2 July, leaving 1,000 (the regiments of Belasyse, Sir Thomas Glemham and Sir Henry Slingsby of Red House) to hold the city.

That evening, the Royalist army was defeated at the Battle of Marston Moor, with stragglers and fugitives making their way to York. Sir Henry Slingsby later wrote in his 'Memoirs'; "We came late to York, which made a great confusion: for at the bar, none were suffer'd to come in but such as were of the town, so the whole street was throng'd up with wound'd and lame people, which made a pitiful cry among them".

== End of the siege ==
Although the Royalists still had other troops and garrisons in the north which might have been used to reform the Royalist armies, Rupert considered that he was needed with the King's main "Oxford Army" in the south of England, and led the troops he had rallied (5,000 horse, and a few hundred foot) out through Monk Bar on the eastern side of the city on 4 July. Newcastle considered the situation hopeless, and sailed from Scarborough with his senior officers to go into exile on the Continent.

Sir Thomas Glemham was left as governor of the city. The Scots and Parliamentarian armies (now reinforced by Meldrum's and Denbigh's forces) resumed the siege on 5 July. Glemham had only 1,000 troops (although Rupert had left several cannons, in addition to those the Royalists had recovered on 1 July), and there was no longer any hope of relief. Glemham could only negotiate honourable terms for surrender. On 16 July, his men marched out of the city, with their arms and colours, heading for Richmond and Carlisle. Most deserted within a few days.

Lord Fairfax was made Governor of York by Parliament. He earned the thanks of the city by refusing to allow religious zealots in the victorious Scots and Parliamentarian armies to vandalise York Minster and the other churches.

== See also ==
- Pontefract Castle

== Sources ==
- Rodgers, H.C.B. (1968). Battles and Generals of the Civil Wars. Seeley Service & Co. Ltd.
- Slingsby, Sir Henry; Hodgson, J (1806). Original Memoirs, written during The Great Civil War Being The Life of Sir Henry Slingsby And Memoirs of Capt Hodgson. Ballantyne & Co.
- Wedgwood, C.V. (1970). The King's War: 1641-1647. London: Fontana.
- Wenham, Leslie Peter (1994) [1970]. The great and close siege of York, 1644. William Sessions. ISBN 1-85072-147-5..
