= Asgarby, East Lindsey =

Hamlet in the East Lindsey district of Lincolnshire, England

Coordinates: 53.17°N 00.01°W

Asgarby
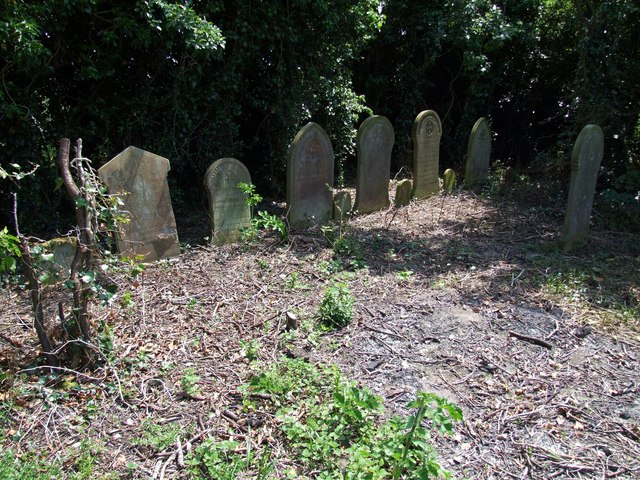
- The site of the former Church of St Swithin, Asgarby Gravestones dedicated to members of the Hall family.

- Location within Lincolnshire
- OS grid reference: TF3366
  - London: 115 mi (185 km) S
- Civil parish: Lusby with Winceby
- District: East Lindsey
- Shire county: Lincolnshire
- Region: East Midlands
- Country: England
- Sovereign state: United Kingdom
- Post town: Spilsby
- Postcode district: PE23
- Police: Lincolnshire
- Fire: Lincolnshire
- Ambulance: East Midlands

Asgarby is a hamlet and former civil parish, now in the parish of Lusby with Winceby, in the East Lindsey district of Lincolnshire, England. It lies just south of the B1195, a road that runs past the battlefield at Winceby. Asgarby is on the opposite side of the road to the battlefield. In 1961 the parish had a population of 22. On 1 April 1987 the parish was abolished to form "Lusby with Winceby".

Asgarby was listed in the Domesday Book of 1086.
