= George Joyce =

Officer in the New Model Army

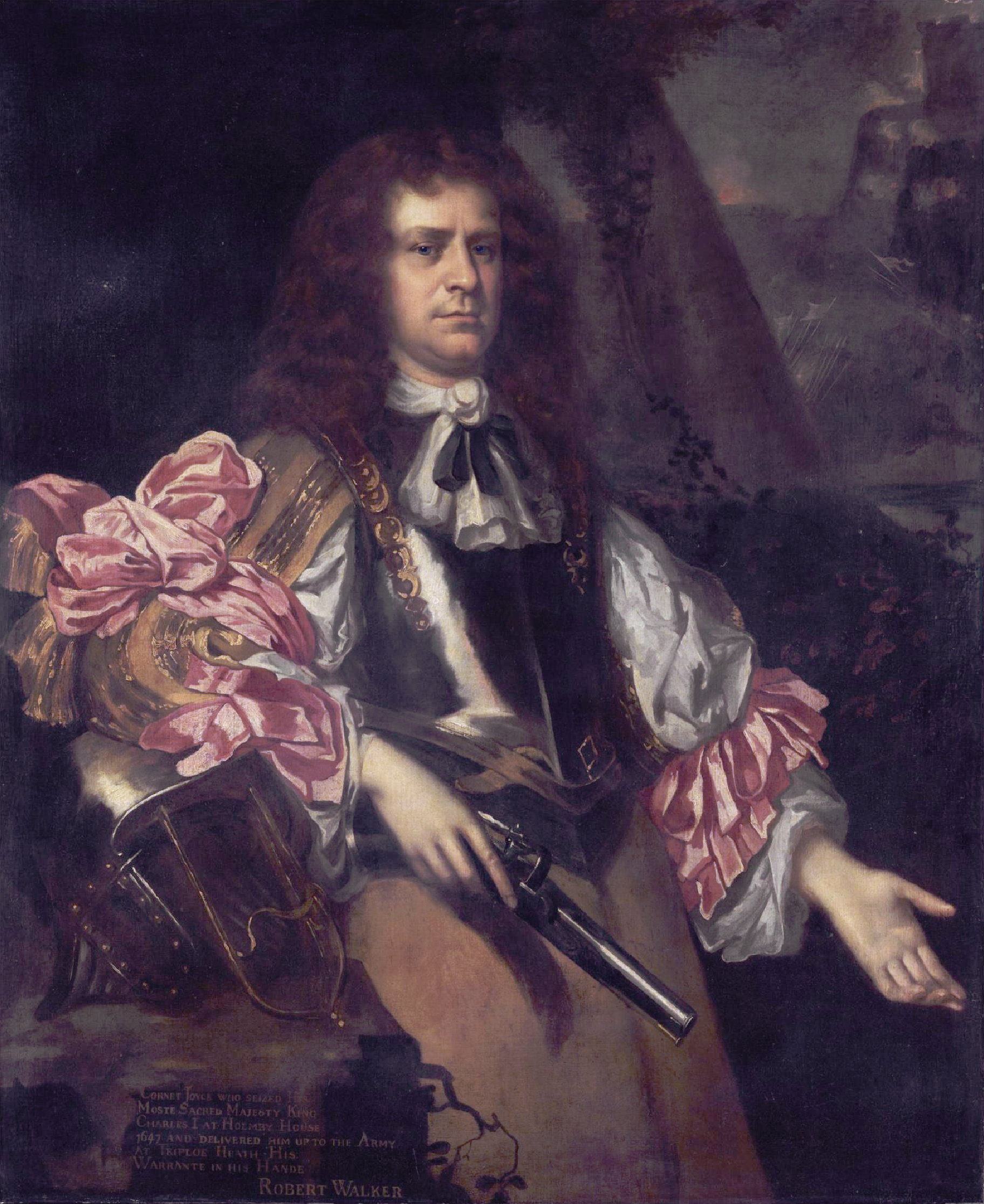
Cornet George Joyce (Jacob Huysmans)

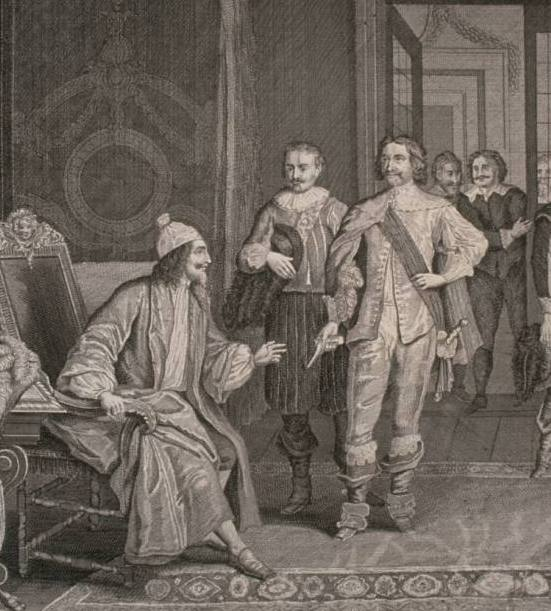
An 18th century illustration of Joyce's arrest of Charles I in 1647

Lieutenant-Colonel George Joyce (born 1618) was an officer and Agitator in the Parliamentary New Model Army during the English Civil War.

Between 2 and 5 June 1647, while the New Model Army was assembling for rendezvous at the behest of the recently formed Army Council, Joyce seized King Charles I from Parliament's custody at Holdenby House and took him to Thomas Fairfax's headquarters on Triploe Heath (8 miles south of Cambridge), a move that weakened Parliament's position and strengthened the Army's.

== Biography ==
=== Early life and career ===
Before joining the army, Joyce worked as a tailor in London. According to royalist historian the Earl of Clarendon in his work, 'The History of the Rebellion', Joyce at one point, "served in a very inferior Employment in Mr. Holles's House."

By 1644, Joyce had enlisted in the Army of the Eastern Association and was serving in Oliver Cromwell's cavalry regiment, nicknamed the 'Ironsides'. By 1647, he was commissioned as a cornet in Sir Thomas Fairfax's lifeguard. Fairfax would later describe Joyce as an "Arch-Agitator."

=== Seizing the King at Holdenby House ===
In 1647, after the conclusion of the First English Civil War, Parliament ordered the New Model Army to disband without full payment of their arrears. In response to this threat, Joyce led a troop of 500 men to take control of Charles I from where he was held in Parliamentary custody at Holdenby House. The plan was possibly formulated by a council of elected representatives of the army, known as 'Agitators,' however Joyce may have also received approval from Cromwell after visiting his house on Drury Lane on May 31. Cromwell later admitted authorising Joyce to secure the King at Holdenby, but denied giving him orders to move him.

On June 2, Joyce successfully occupied Holdenby. He soon received word that Colonel Graves, who had been in command of the regiment that was previously guarding the King, had fled the house. Fearful that Graves would return with a superior force and take the King back into Parliament's control, Joyce made the decision to move Charles to Newmarket, where the New Model Army had set up headquarters.

Armed with a pistol, he entered the King's bedchamber in the middle of the night on June 3, and told him that he must leave with his troop the next morning. As they were about to depart, Charles asked to know by what commission Joyce had been authorised to remove him. In reply, Joyce was said to have simply gestured to the 500 troopers who stood behind him.

Fairfax denied any prior knowledge of Joyce's actions and wanted to have him court-martialled. However, Cromwell and Henry Ireton not only interceded on his behalf, but promised him promotion. Eventually Fairfax would come to appreciate Joyce's decision. Concerning his arrest of the King, Joyce reported in a letter:

"Lett the Agitators know once more wee have done nothing in our owne name, but what wee have done hath been in the name of the whole Army."

=== Political and Military Activity (1648-49) ===
In early 1648, Joyce was promoted to captain and made governor of Southsea Castle. According to an account by Sir John Berkley, while Charles I was in the army's custody on the nearby Isle of Wight, Joyce expressed the view that the King should be brought to trial, so that the parliamentary side "might not bear the blame of the war."

Joyce spoke at the army council debates at Reading in 1648, and at Whitehall in 1649. At Whitehall, he argued that legislative power rested in the hands of the army rather than Parliament, and urged Fairfax and the Grandees "not to shift off that [power] which the Lord hath called you to." He then claimed that through acting as the instruments of God's will, the council would be able to "remove mountains, [and do] such things as were never yet done by men on earth."

During Pride's Purge, Joyce led a group of soldiers into the capital and arrested the Sheriff of London, Major-General Sir Richard Browne; a leading figure of the Presbyterian faction. When Browne protested his arrest, Joyce was reported to have said,

"Do you think that I who laid hands upon a King, fear to apprehend you but his Sheriff?"

=== Life under the Commonwealth ===
On January 30, 1649, Charles I was executed and the Commonwealth of England was established. On 17 June 1650, Joyce was appointed governor of the Isle of Portland, and in August he was given a commission as lieutenant-colonel in a regiment raised by Colonel James Heane. In October 1651, he accompanied Heane on an expedition to retake Jersey, successfully bringing the last remaining Royalist stronghold in the British Isles under parliamentary control.

Joyce, alongside other officers such as Edward Sexby and John Wildman, speculated in confiscated crown property. On 1 October 1651, Parliament voted to grant him Crown Land worth 100 pounds per annum. By that year, he owned Portland Manor outright, after buying out his partner Sexby, and later the manors of East and West Enborne sequestered from royalist Lord Craven. A 1659 pamphlet named him as one of the "Great Men of the Army", who purchased and enclosed Enfield Chase, which it claimed caused local unrest.

In 1653, Joyce opposed Cromwell's dissolution of the Rump parliament without a more “righteous and equal Government” to replace it. He was arrested and briefly imprisoned after being accused of stating that the Leveller Robert Lockyer should have assassinated Cromwell at Bishopsgate. Colonel Pride offered to stand bail for him. According to Joyce’s own account his downfall was in part due to a property dispute with Richard Cromwell.

When the Rump Parliament was restored in the summer of 1659, Joyce was employed in the search for royalist conspirators. A blacksmith named William Houlbrook published an account claiming Joyce manipulated him into expressing pro-royalist sentiment, leading to his arrest and interrogation by John Bradshaw.

=== Life after the Restoration ===
In June 1660, Parliament issued a warrant for Joyce’s arrest after William Lily alleged he had been the masked executioner of Charles I. According to Historian G.E. Alymer, this claim is unlikely to be true as no one else could corroborate it. Consequently, Joyce fled to Rotterdam with his wife and children.

Joyce, along with other former parliamentary officers, was still regarded as a potential threat to the newly restored monarchy, and was closely monitored by state intelligence agencies. In 1664 he was implicated, along with several other republican radicals, in a suspected plot to raise a rebel army.

In 1670, Charles II sent Sir William Temple to Rotterdam to extradite Joyce to England, however Dutch authorities allowed him to escape. It is unknown what happened to him after this.
