= William Packer (Major-General) =

William Packer (fl. 1644–1662) was a religious radical and soldier who served with the Parliamentarian Army in the Wars of the Three Kingdoms. Under the Commonwealth, he was deputy administrator for Hertfordshire and Oxfordshire during the 1655 to 1657 Rule of the Major Generals.

== Career ==
Enlisted in the Eastern Association army, Packer was a trusted lieutenant in Oliver Cromwell's cavalry regiment by 1644. A religious radical, Packer clashed with Major-General Lawrence Crawford, who had him arrested for disobedience. Cromwell intervened to have him released, leading to a bitter dispute between Cromwell and Crawford. On the formation of the New Model Army in 1645, Packer became a captain in Fairfax's regiment of Horse. He was with Fairfax at the siege of Colchester in 1648 and served as a major in Cromwell's regiment in the Scottish campaign of 1650.

During the Rule of the Major-Generals (1655), he deputised for Charles Fleetwood as military governor of Hertfordshire and Oxfordshire.

=== Preacher ===
During the early 1650s, Packer was associated with the London congregation of the Fifth Monarchist John Simpson. Packer was a noted lay preacher and received a licence to preach from the Council of State in 1653. He was appointed a "Trier" to vet candidates for the clergy in 1654.

Packer emerged as one of the most extreme of the Major-Generals. He denounced the celebration of Christmas in 1656 and violently attacked a Royalist who appeared before him drunk. He argued against freedom of worship to the Quakers.

=== Politician ===
Packer was elected to the Second Protectorate Parliament as MP for Woodstock, Oxfordshire, but he had grown discontented with Cromwell's policies. He argued with Cromwell over the instigation of the Upper House and was deprived of his commands in 1658.

Elected to the Third Protectorate Parliament in 1659, Packer delivered a speech in which he expressed his profound sense of betrayal by the Cromwellian régime and regret for some of his own actions as a major-general. He was briefly imprisoned at the Restoration.
