= William Packer =

William Packer may refer to:

- Will Packer (born 1974), American film producer and director
- William Packer (Major-General), Major-General in the English Civil War
- William F. Packer (1807–1870), governor of Pennsylvania from 1858 to 1861
- Billy Packer (born 1940), American sportscaster
