= John Henderson, 5th of Fordell =

Scottish noble (1605–1650)

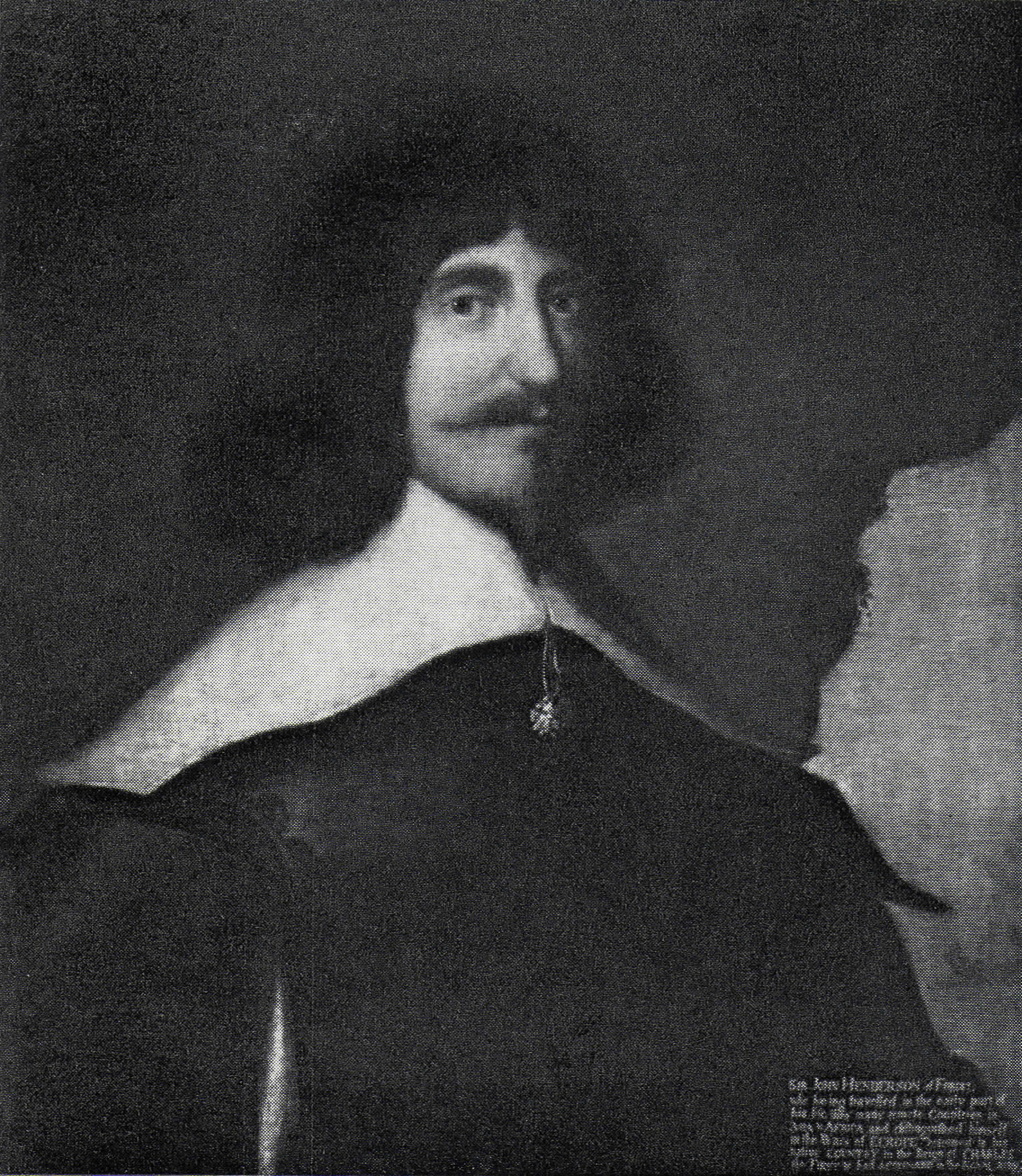
John Henderson of Fordell, painted 1635-37 by George Jamesone

Sir John Henderson, 5th of Fordell (3 November 1605, Fife, Scotland – 11 March 1650, Denmark) was a Scottish laird and mercenary, distinguished as a Cavalier in the Wars of the Three Kingdoms.

He was born in 1605 at Fordell Castle, Fife. A distinguished soldier, Fordell had been enslaved by Barbary pirates when commanding on the East African coast. He then supposedly fell in love with the Princess of Zanzibar who he contrived to escape to Egypt with. Later, Fordell was a mercenary, serving with the military for Denmark, Sweden, and elsewhere, and fought on the side of the Royalists in the Civil War. He was invested as a Knight by King Charles I.

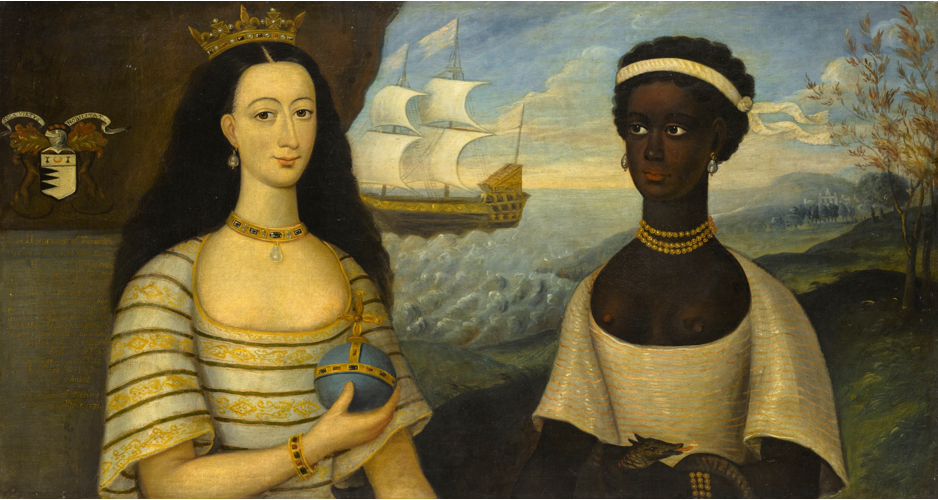
"Portrait of the Princess of Zanzibar with an African attendant"; inscription says it is a 1731 copy by W. Frier of a portrait commissioned by Henderson of his princess

== Civil War ==
Fordell assisted Sir John Digby, the High Sheriff of Nottinghamshire, to seize Newark on behalf of Charles I in late 1642 The Earl of Newcastle then made him Governor of Newark. During his time in Newark, Fordell lived and worked in The Governor's House In February 1643, Fordell led a sortie from the town that successfully repulsed Major-General Thomas Ballard's force of 6,000 Parliamentarians. This led to suspicions that Ballard had colluded with the Royalists.

In March 1643, a large force of Royalists from Newark commanded by Sir Charles Cavendish and Fordell marched into Lincolnshire and captured the town of Grantham in a surprise attack.

On 9 October 1643 the Eastern Association army (under the command of the Earl of Manchester, Oliver Cromwell and Sir Thomas Fairfax) marched from Boston to Bolingbroke Castle. Sir William Widdrington put together a scratch force, which included Fordell's Royalist cavalry, in an attempt to relieve the castle. Two days later, the Earl of Manchester routed Fordell's Royalist cavalry at the Battle of Winceby.

By the end of October 1645 Fordell's liaisons between Charles I and the King of Denmark were known to Parliament as Charles became increasingly desperate in his attempt to obtain aid.

After "his health and means had been exhausted by his long imprisonment" he was allowed to retire to Denmark. A few months later, he returned to England as an envoy of the King of Denmark; due to a concern that he was using his diplomatic status as a cloak for espionage, he was ordered to return to Denmark. Sources agree that he died on 11 March 1650, but differ over the place (either Denmark or Fife).

== Family ==
His parents were Sir John Henderson, 4th of Fordell and Agnes Balfour. He married Margaret Monteith, daughter of Alexander Monteith of Randiford, on 7 February 1625. Together they raised ten children:

1. Jean Henderson (married Thomas Bruce of Blairhall, son of Robert Bruce and Catherine Preston, on 27 April 1748)
2. Sir John Henderson of Fordell, 1st Baronet (d. 26 Jan 1683), created in the Baronetage of Nova Scotia on 15 July 1664.
3. Francis Henderson (killed in action, without issue, having gained the rank of Officer in the service of the French service).
4. George Henderson d. 1659 (killed in action, without issue, in The Netherlands).
5. Margaret Henderson (married Sir Henry Wardlaw of Pitreavie, 3rd Bt. on 9 June 1653, then went on to marry Peter Hay of Maughton).
6. Elizabeth Henderson (married Alexander Mercer of Kinnaird on 9 May 1656, then went on to marry Sir Robert Cunningham, Bt. on 14 May 1660 and later married Sir William Denholme of Westshield on 7 July 1679).
7. Bethia Henderson (married John Roberton of Earnock on 5 March 1662, then went on to marry Alexander Hamilton, 2nd of Dalzell, son of James Hamilton, 1st of Dalzell and Beatrice Fleming).
8. Anna Henderson (married Hon. Archibald Stuart, son of James Stuart, 4th Earl of Moray and Lady Margaret Home, in 1669, then went on to marry Walter Denholme, son of Walter Denholme of Westshield).
9. William Henderson b. c 1628, d. 21 Jul 1676
10. James Henderson b. c 1630, d. 2 May 1675 (a supporter of King Charles II, married Margaret Scott)
