= Cornet (rank) =

Military rank

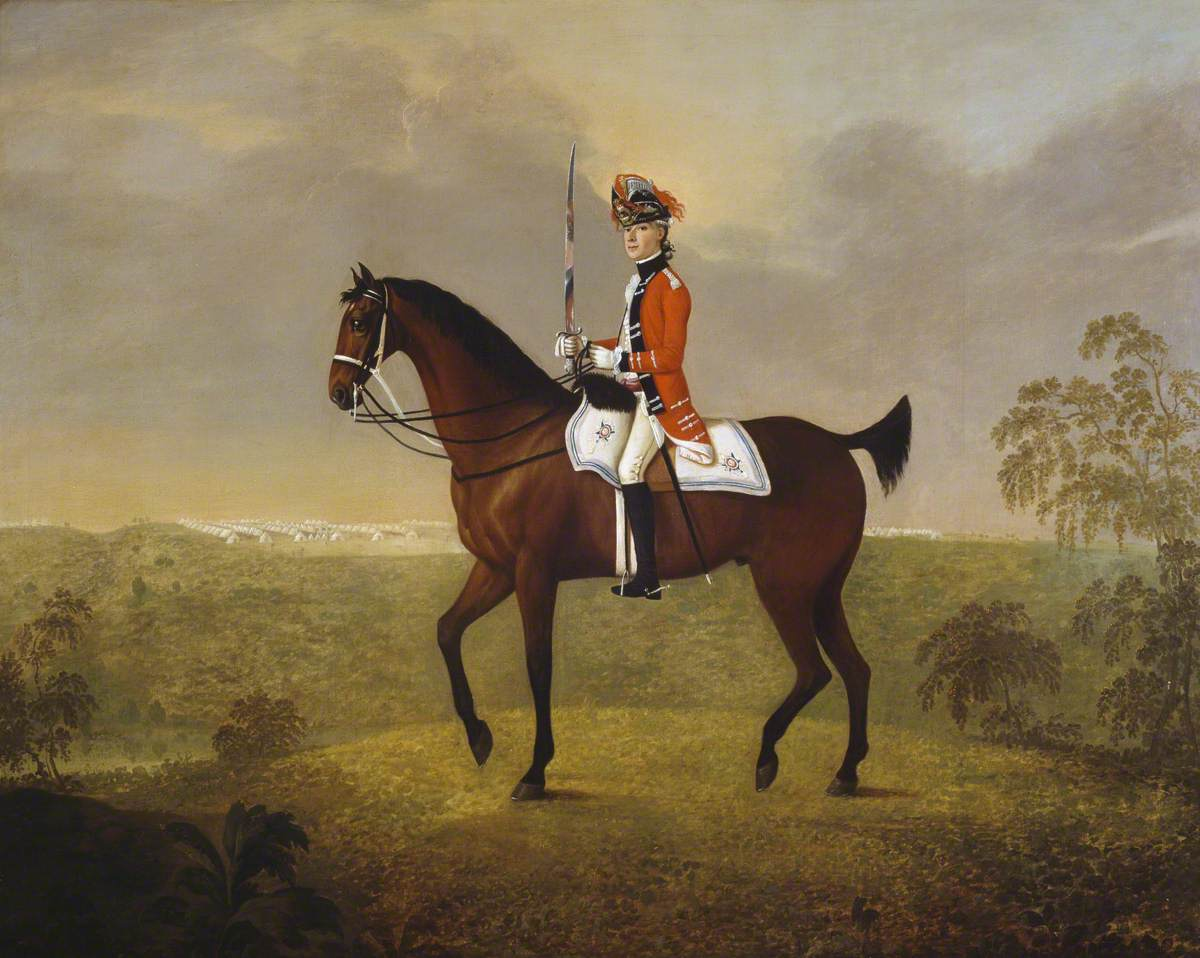
1780 portrait of a British Army cornet

Cornet is a military rank used for junior officers. Originating in late 16th century Europe from the pennon-shaped standards of the same name carried by cavalry troops, the rank was used to refer to the junior officer who carried the standard. Cornets existed as a counterpart to ensigns in infantry units who carried the unit's colours and the rank was adopted by armies across Europe and North America. During the 19th century the rank was gradually replaced by other ranks until being completely phased out. The Blues and Royals and Queen's Royal Hussars of the British Army continue to use the rank of cornet in an informal capacity.

== Origin ==
The rank of cornet originated from a pennon-shaped standard of the same name carried by cavalry troops in 16th-century Europe. Over the course of the century European military literature gradually began referring to the entire troop as "cornets" (the spelling "coronet" was also used) and by the late 16th century the term was also used to refer to the junior officer in the troop who carried the standard, resulting in the rank's creation. The rank existed as a counterpart to ensigns in infantry units who carried the unit's colours. Though the usage of cornet to refer to troops gradually died out in the 17th century the rank remained.

== By country ==
=== Denmark ===
By 1717, the ranks of Fendrich and Cornet of the Royal Life Guards were officer ranks placed in the Eight class in the Danish order of precedence, normal Fendrichs and Cornets were placed in the Ninth class. The rank was reintroduced in 1910–1951 as an enlisted rank.

=== The Netherlands ===
The rank Kornet in the Dutch armed forces is used for last year (most senior) officer cadets who pursue a career in the Royal Marechaussee (gendarmerie/policing), or in the cavalry and artillery branches of the Royal Netherlands Army. Cadets of the same seniority in other branches of the Army or in the Royal Netherlands Air Force are designated the rank Vaandrig and those with the Royal Netherlands Navy Adelborst.

=== South Africa ===
During the late 19th century, the rank of field cornet was used in the militaries of the Boer republics of the South African Republic and Orange Free State for the senior officer of a ward or sub-district. Field cornets were elected by the commandos of their ward for periods of three years. In the case of large wards, an assistant field cornet could also be chosen. The rank was reminiscent of its use by Dutch cavalry troops that the commandos most closely resembled. In apartheid-era South Africa, the rank of field cornet was used in the South African Army from 1960 to 1968.

=== United Kingdom ===
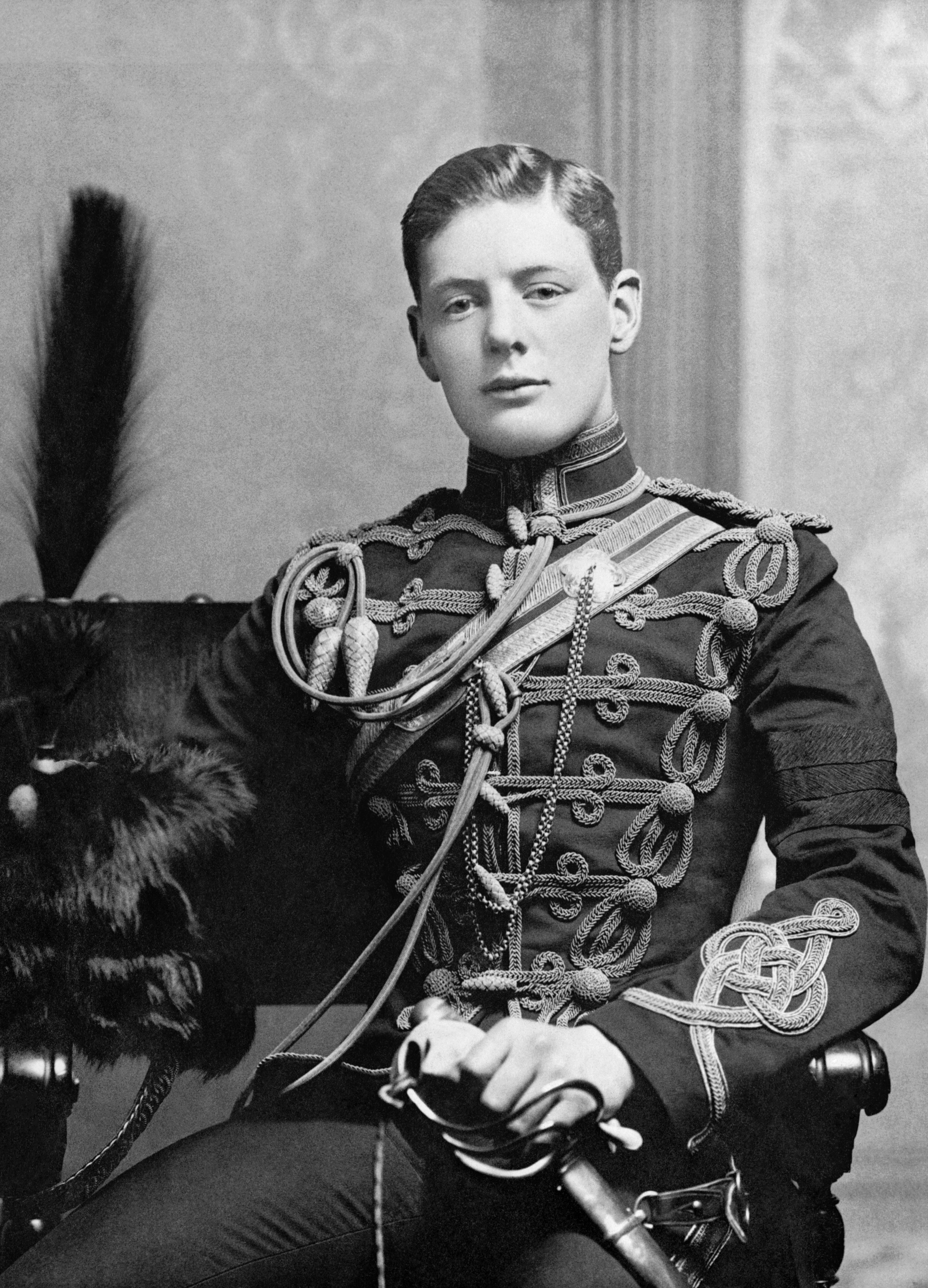
Winston Churchill while serving as a cornet in the 4th Queen's Own Hussars (1895). Churchill's formal rank was second lieutenant.

Cornet was originally the lowest grade of commissioned officer in a British cavalry troop, the modern equivalent being a second lieutenant. Although obsolete, the term is still used as an internal title of address when referring to a second lieutenant within the British Army regiments of the Blues and Royals and Queen's Royal Hussars.

The rank was in use by the time of the English Civil War. Among famous cornets in that conflict were George Joyce, Robert Stetson, and Ninian Beall. It was abolished along with the purchase of commissions in the Regulation of the Forces Act 1871, replaced by sub-lieutenant.

=== United States ===
General Alexander Macomb was initially commissioned a cornet in a career in which he eventually became Commanding General of the United States Army.

The ranks of ensign and cornet were abolished in the United States Army in 1815.

== Traditional duties ==
The subaltern rank of cornet was the equivalent of the contemporary infantry rank of ensign; today both have been supplanted by the rank of second lieutenant. The cornet carried the troop standard, known as a "guidon".

== See also ==
- Fänrik
- Fähnrich
