= Rule of the Major-Generals =

1655–57 English military government

Map of the regions of England and Wales under the Major-Generals

The Rule of the Major-Generals, was a period of direct military government from August 1655 to January 1657, during Oliver Cromwell's Protectorate. England and Wales were divided into ten regions, each governed by a major-general who answered to the Lord Protector.

The period quickly "became a convenient and powerful symbol of the military nature of the unpopular Interregnum state".

== Policies ==
The Rule of the Major-Generals was set up by Cromwell by his orders to the army, and was not supported by Parliamentary legislation. His goal was threefold: to identify, tax, disarm and weaken the Royalists, whom he saw as conspirators against his rule. The system was also an economical measure because the military budget had been cut. The major generals would take control of incumbent civilian administrations, which would not require an expansion of local military forces. As well, he sought "a reformation of manners" or moral regeneration through the suppression of vice and the encouragement of virtue, which he considered much too neglected. The historian Austin Woolrych, using 21st-century terminology, said that the Puritans did not consider it inappropriate to "employ senior military officers as vice squad chiefs".

In March 1655, there were ineffectual-but-concerted Royalist uprisings in England. In late July, news of the defeat of the expedition to Hispaniola, commanded by William Penn and Robert Venables, reached London in 1655. Cromwell felt that the defeat was his punishment from God for not trying to make England a more religious, godly place.

In August, a scheme was proposed to introduce the Rule of the Major-Generals, but prevarication and other delays delayed its introduction to October.

Like Cromwell, the major-generals were Puritans. Part of their job was to try to make England more godly. They clamped down on what they considered to be rowdy behaviour like heavy drinking, music, dancing and fairs. They also tried to stop Christmas celebrations. Their rule was unpopular.

The Second Protectorate Parliament voted down Major-General John Desborough's "Militia Bill" on 29 January 1657 by 124 votes to 88. This bill would have perpetuated the Decimation Tax that funded the mounted militia, which was collected by Cromwell's major-generals; the failure of the bill caused the so-called Rule of the Major-Generals in the counties to end.

The Rule of the Major-Generals is regarded by a large number of authors as a military dictatorship, with the exception of Austin Woolrych. The argument of Woolrych against such definition is that the major-generals remained within the boundaries of the law, they had minimal or no long-term influence in local government and their authority only lasted for less than two years.

== Historical legacy ==
Patrick Little wrote an article on the Major-General (2012) in the Oxford Dictionary of National Biography:

The religious zeal of the major-generals, coupled with their attempt to impose godly rule on England and Wales, has given them a lasting reputation as po-faced puritans and killjoys, and this reputation has attached itself to the Cromwellian regime as a whole. Few have addressed the subject without emotion.... Others have traced back to this period the English love of freedom and hatred of standing armies and military rule. Modern historians tend to portray the major-generals either as the gauleiters of the Cromwellian military state or as misguided religious zealots.

== List ==
There were ten regional associations covering England and Wales administered by major-generals. Ireland, under Major-General Henry Cromwell, (Note: Cromwell was nominally under the Lord Deputy of Ireland, Charles Fleetwood, but Fleetwood's departure for England in September 1655 left Cromwell the ruler of Ireland for all practical purposes.) and Scotland, under Major-General George Monck, were in administrations that had already been agreed upon and were not part of the scheme.

Name	Period	Region	Deputies	Notes
James Berry	Appointed in 1655	Herefordshire, Shropshire, Worcestershire and Wales	John Nicholas in Monmouthshire; Rowland Dawkins in Carmarthenshire, Cardiganshire, Glamorgan, Pembrokeshire.	
William Boteler (Butler)		Bedfordshire, Huntingdonshire, Northamptonshire and Rutland		Zealous and uncompromising in his hostility to his religious and political enemies, Boteler was a severe persecutor of Quakers in Northamptonshire; in 1656 he advocated that James Nayler should be stoned to death for blasphemy. Boteler was also aggressive in his persecution of Royalists in his area, unlawfully imprisoning the Earl of Northampton for failing to pay his taxes.
John Desborough		Cornwall, Devon, Dorset, Gloucestershire, Somerset and Wiltshire		
Charles Fleetwood	Appointed in 1655	Buckinghamshire, Cambridgeshire, Essex, Hertfordshire, Isle of Ely, Norfolk, Oxfordshire and Suffolk	George Fleetwood (a distant kinsman) in Buckinghamshire; Hezekiah Haynes in Essex, Cambridgeshire, Isle of Ely, Norfolk, Suffolk; William Packer as military governor of Hertfordshire and Oxfordshire	Owing to his other responsibilities on the Council of State, day to day matters in his region were overseen by Fleetwood's three deputies.
William Goffe	October 1655	Berkshire, Hampshire and Sussex		
Thomas Kelsey		Surrey and Kent		
John Lambert		Cumberland, County Durham, Northumberland, Westmorland and Yorkshire	Charles Howard in Cumberland, Northumberland, Westmorland; Robert Lilburne in County Durham, Yorkshire	Owing to his other responsibilities on the Council of State, day to day matters in his region were overseen by Lambert's two deputies.
Philip Skippon		Middlesex; including the cities of London and Westminster	Sir John Barkstead	Skippon was by now elderly, and on the Council of State, so most of the day to day matters in his region were largely undertaken by Barkstead.
Edward Whalley		Derbyshire, Leicestershire, Lincolnshire, Nottinghamshire, Warwickshire,		
Charles Worsley; Tobias Bridge	1655–June 1656; June 1656–January 1657	Cheshire, Lancashire and Staffordshire		Appointed in October 1655, Worsley was extremely zealous in carrying out his instructions. No one suppressed more alehouses, or was more active in sequestering royalists, preventing horse-races, and carrying on the work of reformation. Worsley died on 12 June 1656, and Tobias Bridge replaced him.
