= Captain Oliver Cromwell's Troop of Horse =

1642 military unit of the English Civil War

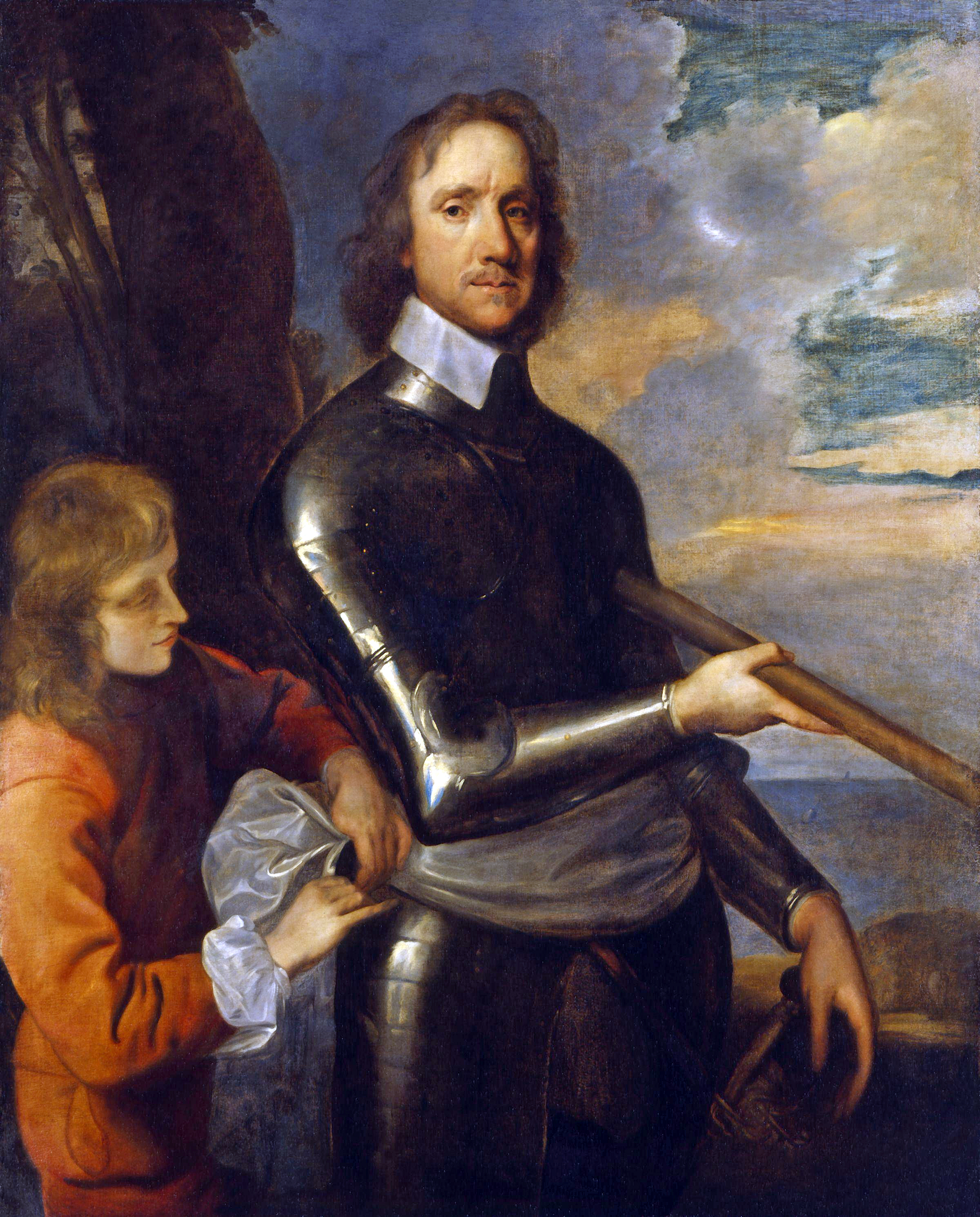
- Oliver Cromwell, who raised the troop of horse at Huntingdon in August 1642
- Active: August 1642 – early 1643
- Disbanded: early 1643
- Country: Kingdom of England
- Allegiance: Parliamentarian
- Branch: Cavalry
- Type: Troop of horse
- Role: Reconnaissance and cavalry skirmishing
- Size: One troop (approx. 60–100 men)
- Part of: Part of Earl of Essex's Regiment of Horse; later expanded into Cromwell's Regiment of Horse
- Garrison/HQ: Huntingdon, Cambridgeshire
- Nicknames: Ironsides (later, as a regiment)
- Engagements: English Civil War

Commanders
- Captain: Oliver Cromwell
- Quartermaster: John Desborough

Captain Oliver Cromwell's Troop of Horse was a Parliamentarian cavalry troop raised by Cromwell in Huntingdonshire in 1642 at the outbreak of the English Civil War. It later expanded into a regiment.

Cromwell, probably inexperienced as a soldier, first mustered a troop of cavalry (then referred to as "horse") at Huntingdon in Huntingdonshire, on 29 August 1642, early in the Civil War. John Desborough was quartermaster. Cromwell was notably keen on getting "religious men" into his troop and they had a reputation of never running away from the enemy.

Granted a commission in August 1642, Cromwell received £1,104 from parliamentary funds and was able to prevent colleges of Cambridge University from donating money and college plate to the Royalist cause. Although a cartload got to the king Cromwell's occupation of Cambridge and imprisoning of several heads of colleges stopped any more getting to the King.

However in September 1642 he was ordered to join the Earl of Essex at Northampton, whereon Cromwell's troop was listed amongst Essex's Regiment of Horse. The troop was put under the command of Sir Philip Stapleton and although there are conflicting accounts, it appears to have been late in being organised arriving too late to participate in the Battle of Edgehill, the first pitched battle of the war. Cromwell however did witness the defeat of the Parliamentarian horse at the battle and wrote to fellow Parliamentarian leader John Hampden,

Your troopers are most of them old decayed servingmen and tapsters; and their [the Cavalier] troopers are gentlemen's sons, younger sons and persons of quality; do you think that the spirits of such base and mean fellows [as ours] will ever be able to encounter gentlemen that have honour and courage and resolution in them?

Because of Cromwell's local prominence Cromwell was needed to help with the newly formed Eastern Association, a combination of existing Parliamentarian militias formed in 20 December. In January 1643 before he left Essex's camp in London to go to the Eastern Association, Cromwell was given a commission as colonel giving him power to expand his troop into a full regiment.

During the journey from the troop stopped the royalist High Sherriff of Hertfordshire from reading the King's Commission of Array in St Albans, arresting him and sending him to London. When they got to Cambridge, the troop was one of the first to join the Eastern Association's forces.

The troop continued as the colonel's troop within Cromwell's enlarged regiment, the first lieutenant colonel under Cromwell was the later general James Berry who had been recruited by Cromwell in the original troop. After Berry took command of his own troop, John Gladman became the lieutenant colonel.

== Sources ==
- Durston, Christopher (2004). "Berry, James (died 1691)". Oxford Dictionary of National Biography (online ed.). Oxford University Press. doi:10.1093/ref:odnb/2264. (Subscription, Wikipedia Library access or UK public library membership required.)
- Firth, Charles Harding (1899). "The Raising of the Ironsides". Transactions of the Royal Historical Society. New Series. 13. Cambridge University Press: 17–73. doi:10.2307/3678126. JSTOR 3678126.
- Firth, Charles Harding (1900). "IV – "The First Campaign, 1642"". Oliver Cromwell and the Rule of the Puritans in England. Project Gutenberg.
- Spring, Laurence (2022). Campaigns of the Eastern Association : the rise of Oliver Cromwell, 1642-1645. Warwick: Helion & Company. ISBN 9781915113986.
- Wedgwood, C.V. (1970). The King's War: 1641-1647. London: Fontana.
- Young, Peter; Holmes, Richard (2000). The English Civil War:A Military History of the Three Civil Wars, 1642–1651. Ware, Hertfordshire: Wordsworth Editions. ISBN 1-84022-222-0.
