= John Desborough =

English soldier and politician (1608–1680)

- Born: 1608
- Died: 1680 (aged 71–72)
- Military career
- Allegiance: Parliamentary cause
- Rank: Major-General
- Conflicts: English Civil War
- Other work: Politician

John Desborough (1608–1680) was an English soldier and politician who supported the parliamentary cause during the English Civil War.

== Life ==
He was the son of James Desborough of Eltisley, Cambridgeshire, and of Elizabeth Hatley of Over in the same county. He was baptized on 13 November 1608. He was educated in law. On 23 June 1636 he married Jane, daughter of Robert Cromwell of Huntingdon and sister of Oliver Cromwell – the future Lord Protector, at Eltisley.

He took an active part in the English Civil War, and showed considerable military ability being quartermaster of Cromwell's troop that was raised among Huntingdonshire gentry. In 1645, he was present as major in the engagement at Langport on 10 July, at Hambleton Hill on 4 August, and on 10 September he commanded the horse at the Storming of Bristol. Later he took part in the operations round Oxford. In 1648, as colonel he commanded the forces at Great Yarmouth.

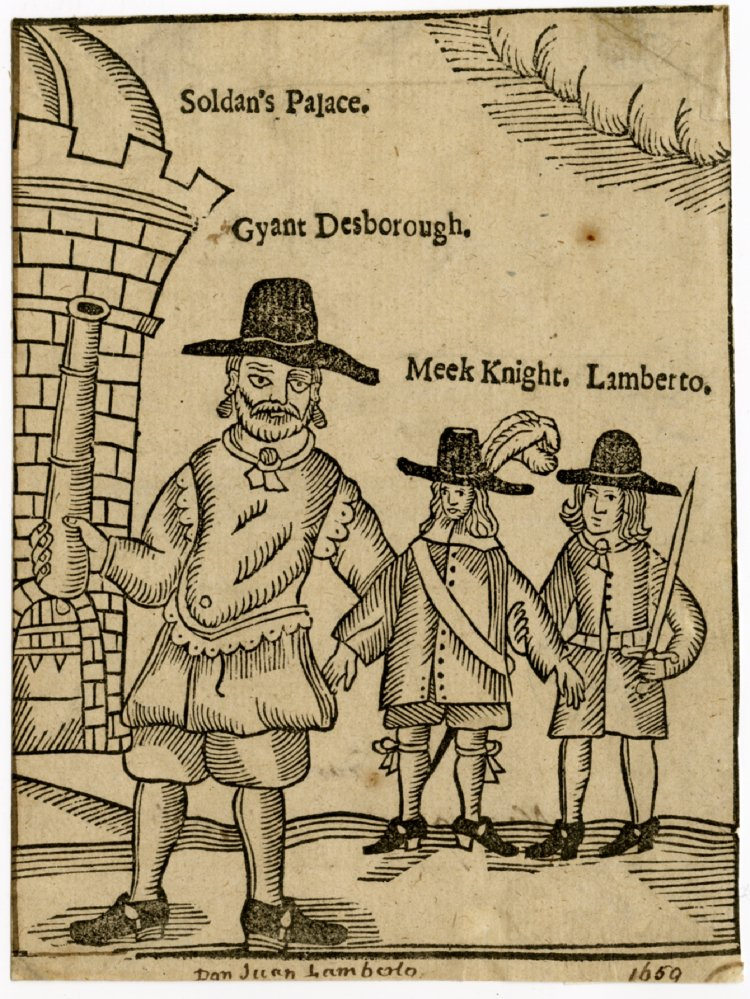
Satirical illustration of 1661 showing 'Gyant Desborough' brandishing a cannon outside Oliver Cromwell's palace

He avoided all participation in the trial of Charles I in June 1649, being employed in the settlement of the west of England. He fought at Worcester as major-general and nearly captured Charles II near Salisbury.

After the establishment of the Commonwealth of England he was chosen, on 7 January 1652, a member of the committee for legal reforms. In 1653, he became a member of the Protectorate council of state, and a commissioner of the treasury, and was appointed one of the four Generals at Sea and a commissioner for the army and navy. In 1654, he was made constable of St Briavel's Castle in Gloucestershire. During the Rule of the Major-Generals (1655–1656) he was appointed major-general over the south west. He had been nominated a member of the Barebones Parliament in 1653, and he was returned to the First Protectorate Parliament of 1654 for Cambridgeshire, and to the Second Protectorate Parliament in 1656 for Somersetshire. In the Second Parliament, he introduced the "Militia Bill" which was voted down by one hundred and twenty four votes to eighty eight. If passed it would have helped to finance the Army by imposing a ten per cent "Decimation Tax", on known Royalists.

In July 1657, he became a member of the Protector's Privy Council, and in 1658 he accepted a seat in Cromwell's Other House (House of Lords).

In spite of his near relationship to the Protectors family, he was one of the most violent opponents of the assumption by Cromwell of the royal title, and after the Protector's death, instead of supporting the interests and government of his nephew Richard Cromwell, he was, with Charles Fleetwood, the chief instigator and organizer of the hostility of the army towards his administration, and forced Richard Cromwell by threats and menaces to dissolve his Third Protectorate Parliament in April 1659. Desborough was chosen a member of the Council of State by the restored Rump Parliament, and made colonel and governor of Plymouth, but presenting with other officers a seditious petition from the Army Council, on 5 October 1659, was about a week later dismissed. After the exclusion of the Rump Parliament from the Palace of Westminster by Fleetwood on 13 October, he was chosen by the officers a member of the new administration and commissary-general of the horse.

The new military government, however, rested on no solid foundation, and its leaders quickly found themselves without any influence. Desborough himself became an object of ridicule, his regiment even revolted against him, and on the return of the Rump he was ordered to quit London. At the Restoration he was excluded from the 1660 Indemnity and Oblivion Act but not included in the clause of pains and penalties extending to life and goods, being therefore only incapacitated from public employment. Soon afterwards he was arrested on suspicion of conspiring to kill the king and queen, but was quickly liberated. Subsequently, he escaped to the Netherlands, where he engaged in republican intrigues. Accordingly, he was ordered home, in April 1666, on pain of incurring the charge of treason, and obeying was imprisoned in the Tower of London until February 1667, when he was examined before the council and set free.

Desborough died in 1680. By his first wife, Cromwell's sister, he had one daughter and seven sons; he married a second wife in April 1658 whose name is unrecorded. He was summed up in the 1911 Encyclopædia Britannica as "a good soldier and nothing more; and his only conception of government was by force and by the army. His rough person and manners are the constant theme of ridicule in the royalist ballads, and he is caricatured by Samuel Butler in Hudibras and in the Parable of the Lion and the Fox."
