= Lawrence Crawford (soldier) =

Lawrence Crawford (1611 – August, 1645) was a Scottish soldier who fought in English or other armies on the continent of Europe. His motives were not mercenary, as he fought only for Presbyterian principles or causes.

== Biography ==
He was born in Glasgow, the son of Hugh Crawford of Kilbirnie and from a fairly early age served in the armies of Christian IV of Denmark, Gustavus Adolphus of Sweden and Charles I Louis, Elector Palatine. Having travelled to England in the suite of Charles Louis, in 1641 Crawford was appointed Colonel of a regiment of foot which was to serve in Ireland in the army of the Earl of Ormonde to put down the Irish Rebellion of 1641.

From 1641 to 1643, Crawford remained in Ireland, although the English Civil War had broken out in England. In 1643, Ormonde agreed to a "cessation", or a truce with the rebel Irish Catholic Confederation, and to send troops to England to support the Royalists fighting for King Charles I. Crawford refused to serve with these troops, against the Presbyterian Covenanters. Ormonde had him arrested, but he escaped and made his way to England.

He was appointed by Parliament to be Sergeant Major General of Foot in the Parliamentarian Army of the Eastern Association, raised in the eastern counties of England. He almost immediately clashed with the army's Lieutenant General, Oliver Cromwell, over the appointment of Independents as officers. Parliament's agreement with the Scottish Covenanters, by which Presbyterianism was to be made the established religion of both countries meant that Crawford was legally in the right, but neither General would give way. The army's commander, the Earl of Manchester supported Crawford and the official position.

In 1644, Manchester's army took part in the Siege of York. Crawford exploded a mine beneath a tower forming part of the city walls, but had insufficient troops on hand to storm the city through the breach. His men were driven back with heavy casualties. Crawford attracted some censure for this. It is possible that he believed that the mine was about to be flooded by the defenders, and decided to fire it rather than lose it ignominiously.

On 2 July, after York was relieved by Prince Rupert of the Rhine, the Battle of Marston Moor was fought. Crawford's foot regiments provided invaluable support to Cromwell's cavalry, who largely won the battle. Some of Cromwell's opponents in Parliament alleged that Crawford had commanded Cromwell's troopers while Cromwell was having a wound attended to, or in a state of panic. There was never any evidence for this apart from malicious second-hand gossip.

The victory brought no peace between the two generals. Cromwell demanded that Crawford be dismissed, but withdrew the demand on the grounds of military necessity. When Cromwell demanded an inquiry into the conduct of Manchester after the Second Battle of Newbury, Crawford supported Manchester before the House of Commons.

When Parliament created the New Model Army, Crawford was offered command of one of its regiments of foot, but refused to serve in what he regarded as an army of Independents. Instead, he served in the smaller army of the "Western Association" under Edward Massey. He was killed in August 1645, at the Siege of Hereford by a Royalist sniper.
