= Ironside (cavalry) =

Cavalry in England in the 17th century

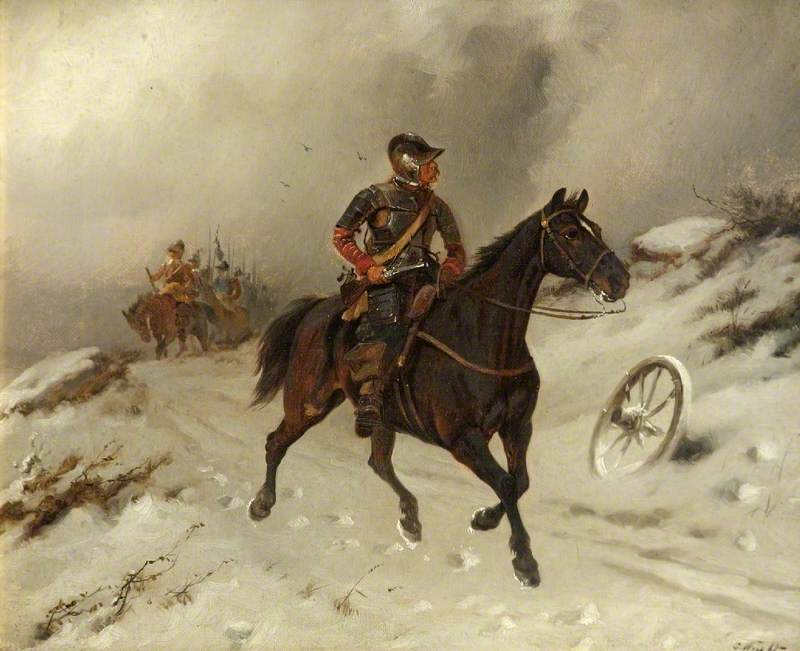
Cromwell's Troopers by George Wright

The Ironsides were troopers in the Parliamentary cavalry trained by English political and military leader Oliver Cromwell in the 17th century, during the English Civil War. The name came from "Old Ironsides", one of Cromwell's nicknames. It was after the battle of Marston Moor on 2 July 1644 that Prince Rupert of the Rhine, the commander of the Royalist Army, "first gave the nickname to his enemy of 'Old Ironsides' because his ranks were so impenetrable—the name originated with the man and passed on to his regiment". (Note: A contemporary Parliamentarian newspaper asserted that it was the Royalist Prince Rupert who had given Cromwell the nickname after Rupert's defeat at Marston Moor in July 1644: "Munday we had intelligence that Lieutenant-Gen. Cromwell alias 'Ironside' (for that title was given him by P. Rupert after his defeate neere York) [i.e., at Marston Moor] was about Redding (sic) with 2500 horse marching towards Sir William Waller.")

Cromwell first mustered a troop of cavalry (then referred to as "horse") at Huntingdon in Huntingdonshire, on 29 August 1642, early in the Civil War. John Desborough was quartermaster. They were part of the Edgehill formations but it was unclear whether they were involved in the fighting.

== Within the Eastern Association ==
It is evident that Cromwell's answer to his own question lay in religious conviction. Early in 1643, he was given a commission as colonel and expanded his troop into a full regiment in the newly formed army of the Eastern Association, under the command of Lord Grey of Warke and then the Earl of Manchester. By 11 September that year (1643), he referred to them in a letter to his cousin Oliver St. John as a "lovely company". A champion of the "godly", Cromwell became notorious for appointing men of comparatively humble origins but stoutly-held Puritan beliefs as officers, who would then attract men of similar background and leanings to the regiment. He wrote to Sir William Spring, who disagreed with this policy,

I had rather have a plain russet-coated captain that knows what he fights for and loves what he knows, than that which you call a gentleman and is nothing else. I honour a gentleman that is so indeed.

On 28 July 1643, the regiment took part in the Battle of Gainsborough, where Royalist cavalry were defeated. One of the troop captains, James Berry, is stated to have killed the Royalist commander, Sir Charles Cavendish, a relation of the Marquess of Newcastle (Commander-in-Chief of the Royalist forces in the North).

The regiment's troops in 1643 were:

- Colonel Oliver Cromwell's
- Major Edward Whalley's
- Captain John Desborough's
- Captain Valentine Walton (Junior)'s
- Captain Oliver Cromwell (Junior)'s
- Captain James Berry's
- Captain Robert Swallow's, known as the "Maiden Troop" and drawn from Norwich.
- Captain Ralph Margery's
- Captain Henry Ireton's (Transferred from the Earl Of Essex's regiment)

By April, 1644, after two years of war, Cromwell's unit had grown into a "double" regiment of no less than 14 troops. (A regiment normally had only 6 troops). Cromwell by this time was Lieutenant General of the Horse in the Parliamentarian Army of the Eastern Association, and the regiment would be routinely commanded by its lieutenant colonel, Cromwell's cousin Edward Whalley. The regiment played a major part in the victory over the Royalists at the Battle of Marston Moor, where the discipline of Cromwell's wing of horse was decisive. Where a victorious wing of Royalist cavalry scattered in search of plunder, Cromwell's men rallied after defeating their immediate opponents, and then swept the disordered Royalist armies from the field. Captain Valentine Walton, Cromwell's nephew, died of wounds after a cannon shot smashed his leg during the battle.

It was a different story by the time of the Second Battle of Newbury later that year. The Parliamentarian high command of Sir William Waller, the Earl of Manchester, Sir William Balfour and Cromwell decided to split their large force into two. Cromwell, the Eastern and London Association Cavalry and the Southern Association headed across the river and toward Donnington Castle in the West. The regiment was part of the first attack on the King's western forces under Goring and Astley, but was beaten back and had to be relieved by Cromwell's fellow commander, Sir William Balfour, and his London horse.

== The template for the New Model Army ==
Cromwell's double regiment was later split into two regiments (Sir Thomas Fairfax's and Edward Whalley's), which became the nucleus of the New Model Army's cavalry. Shortly before the Battle of Naseby, Cromwell was reappointed Lieutenant General of Horse in the army, and later became its commander. "Ironsides" seems to have become the term for all cavalry in the army, regardless of their origin.

Two "divisions" i.e. half-regiments of three troops each, one from each of Fairfax's and Whalley's regiments, under Major Christopher Bethel and Major John Desborough, mounted a remarkable charge at the Battle of Langport, where they galloped up a narrow lane and attacked the Royalist Army of Lord Goring in front, putting the entire army to flight.

== Dress, equipment and nature ==
Although the phrase "Ironside" suggests heavily armoured men, Cromwell's troops were equipped in the common cavalry style of the day, termed the harquebusier, with armour limited to a back and breastplate, and "pot" helmet. It does seem that they presented a uniform appearance which contrasted with that of the Cavalier horse, which became increasingly individual during the war through shortage of equipment or personal choice.

As Puritans, the Ironsides often attributed their glory in battle to God. Their religious beliefs extended to the field where they adhered to strict ethical codes. In quarters, they did not drink or gamble. They did not partake in the traditional spoils of war and did not rape, or pillage defeated opponents.

== In fiction ==
The Ironsides are featured in Rosemary Sutcliff's 1953 historical fiction novel Simon, and are portrayed as being very professional soldiers with strong puritan religious tendencies.

== In music ==
Lawrence J. Epstein writes that the lyric "heaven is like Ironside's" in Bob Dylan's I Pity the Poor Immigrant refers to the puritanical view of religion shared by the followers of Cromwell.

== See also ==
- Cromwell's Soldiers' Pocket Bible
