= Charles Cavendish (general, died 1643) =

English general (1620–1643)

Charles Cavendish (1620–1643) was an English royalist general, killed at the battle of Gainsborough.

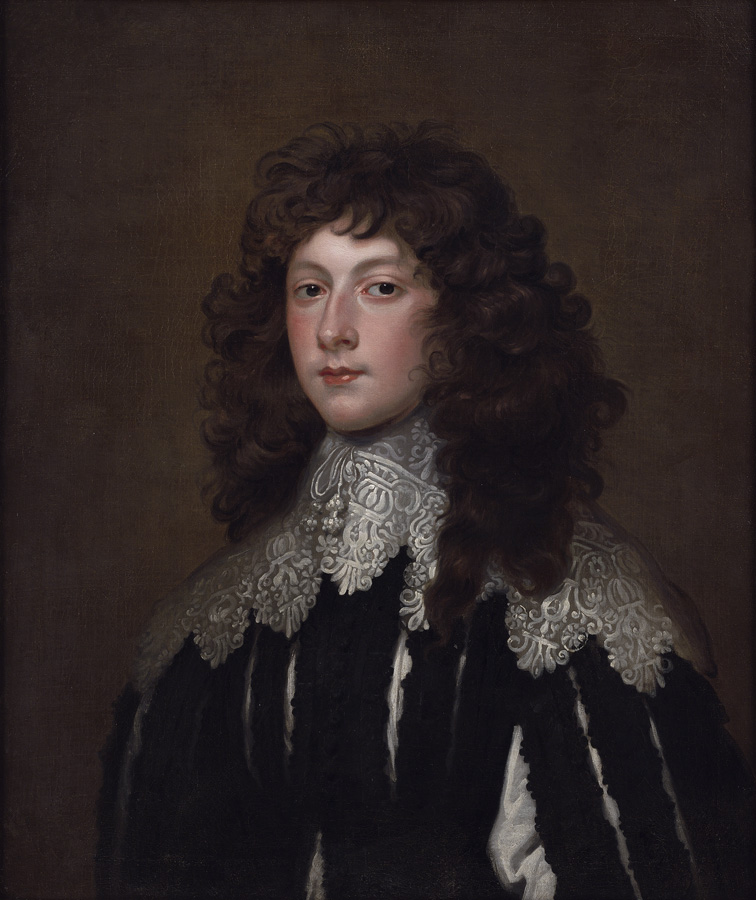
Charles Cavendish (1620–1643)

== Life ==
He was second son of William Cavendish, 2nd Earl of Devonshire and his wife Christiana, born on 30 May 1620, and named after King Charles I of England, his godfather. In 1638 he was sent abroad to travel with a governor, visiting Cairo and Turkey. He returned to England in May 1641, and then served in a campaign under the Prince of Orange.

On the outbreak of the First English Civil War he entered the king's troop of guards as a volunteer under the command of Lord Bernard Stuart. At the battle of Edgehill he distinguished himself and was given the command of the Duke of York's troop left vacant by the death of George Stewart, 9th Seigneur d'Aubigny. After a disagreement with an inferior officer, he sought an independent command, and obtained from the king a commission to raise a regiment of horse in the north. He then established himself at Newark; active against the parliamentarians, he was requested by the king's commissioners for Nottinghamshire and Lincolnshire as commander-in-chief, and took on the forces of those two counties, with the rank of colonel-general.

On 23 March 1643 he captured Grantham with the aid of a large force drawn from Newark under the command of Colonel Sir John Henderson, and on 11 April defeated the younger Hotham at Ancaster, threatening to break-out into the eastern association area. He received the queen Henrietta Maria at Newark, and escorted her part of her way to Oxford, taking Burton-on-Trent by assault during the march, 2 July 1643. But attempting to prevent the raising of the siege of Gainsborough, he was defeated by Oliver Cromwell, and fell by the hand of James Berry, Cromwell's captain-lieutenant (28 July 1643). He was buried at Newark; thirty years later his body was moved to Derby, to be interred with his mother.
