= Winceby =

Village in Lincolnshire, England

Coordinates: 53.194365°N 0.023489°W

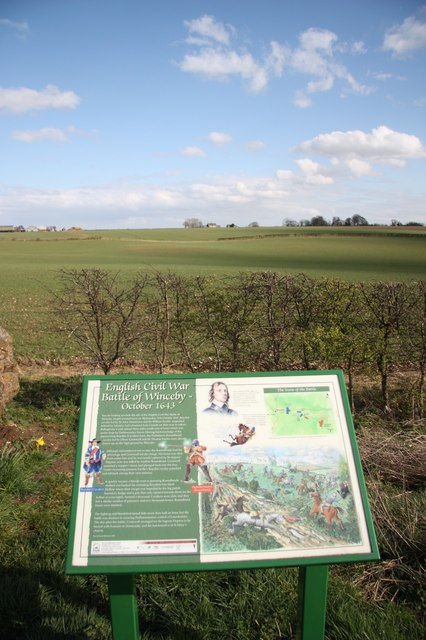
- Site of Winceby Battlefield

- Location within Lincolnshire
- OS grid reference: TF321681
  - London: 120 mi (190 km) SSW
- Civil parish: Lusby with Winceby
- District: East Lindsey
- Shire county: Lincolnshire
- Region: East Midlands
- Country: England
- Sovereign state: United Kingdom
- Post town: Horncastle
- Postcode district: LN9
- Police: Lincolnshire
- Fire: Lincolnshire
- Ambulance: East Midlands
- UK Parliament: Louth and Horncastle (UK Parliament constituency)

Winceby is a village in the civil parish of Lusby with Winceby, in the East Lindsey district of Lincolnshire, England. It is in the Lincolnshire Wolds, and about 5 miles (8.0 km) from both Horncastle and Spilsby. In 1971 the parish had a population of 24. On 1 April 1987 the parish was abolished to form "Lusby with Winceby".

The village is notable for the (Civil War) Battle of Winceby, which took place in 1643, when the Royalist army was defeated by the Roundheads at "Slash Hill".

There is a church, St Margaret's, and a garage. The village is very close to the Snipe Dales nature reserve and country park, owned by the Lincolnshire Wildlife Trust.

== See also ==
- Battle of Winceby
