= Army Council (1647) =

Army Council (1647–1648) Council of Officers (1648–1653)
- Leader: Thomas Fairfax
- Dates active: 1647–1653
- Dissolved: 20 April 1653
- Merger of: Agitators; Grandees
- Merged into: Privy Council
- Country: England
- Allegiance: Parliament
- Part of: New Model Army

The Army Council was a body established in 1647 to represent the views of all levels of the New Model Army. It originally consisted of senior commanders, like Sir Thomas Fairfax, and representatives elected by their regiments, known as Agitators.

Following the Putney Debates of October to November 1647, Fairfax, Oliver Cromwell and Henry Ireton grew concerned by their radicalism, and in 1648, Agitators were removed from the Council. Now dominated by the so-called Grandees, it became the Council of Officers.

== Background ==
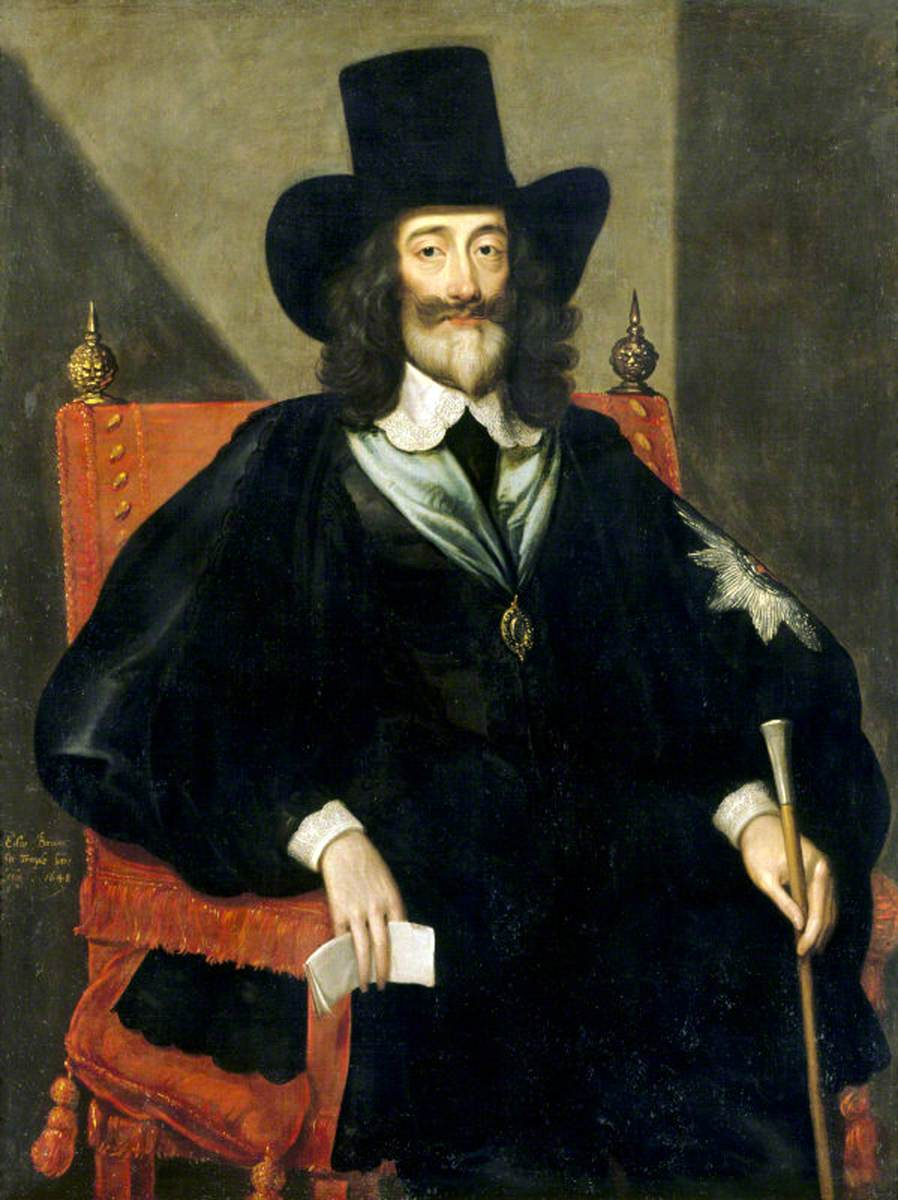
Charles I; by 1648, a significant element felt only his death could end the conflict

When the First English Civil War began in 1642, the vast majority on both sides believed a 'well-ordered' monarchy was divinely mandated. They disagreed on what 'well-ordered' meant, and who held ultimate authority in clerical affairs. Royalists generally supported a Church of England governed by bishops, appointed by, and answerable to, the king; Puritans tended to believe that church leaders should be appointed by their congregations.

However, 'Puritan' was a term for anyone who wanted to reform, or 'purify', the Church of England, and contained many different perspectives. Presbyterians were the most prominent in the Long Parliament; in general, they wanted to convert the Church of England into a Presbyterian body, similar to the Church of Scotland. Independents opposed any state church, and although smaller in number, included Cromwell, as well as much of the New Model Army.

Having established control of Scotland in the 1639 to 1640 Bishops Wars, the Covenanters viewed the 1643 Solemn League and Covenant with Parliament as a way to preserve it, by preventing Royalist victory in England. As the war progressed, they and their English co-religionists came to see the Independents, and their political allies like the Levellers, as a greater threat to the established order than the Royalists. In 1646, many Parliamentarians assumed military defeat would force Charles I to agree terms, but this was a fundamental misunderstanding of his character. Charles refused to agree any substantial concessions, frustrating allies and opponents alike.

At this stage, the idea of establishing a republic was largely confined to a radicals like the Levellers; Parliament presented its conditions to Charles, known as the Newcastle conditions. They included establishing the Church of England as a Presbyterian body, handing control of the army to Parliament and accepting punishment of leading Royalists. Although Charles continued negotiations, he had no intention of agreeing to these conditions.

== Establishment of the General Council ==
Despite victory in the First English Civil War, Parliament was struggling with the economic cost of the war, a poor 1646 harvest, and a recurrence of the plague. The Presbyterian faction which formed a majority of MPs had the support of the London Trained Bands, the Army of the Western Association, leaders like Rowland Laugharne in Wales, and elements of the Royal Navy. By March 1647, the New Model was owed more than £3 million in unpaid wages; Parliament ordered it to Ireland, stating only those who agreed would be paid.

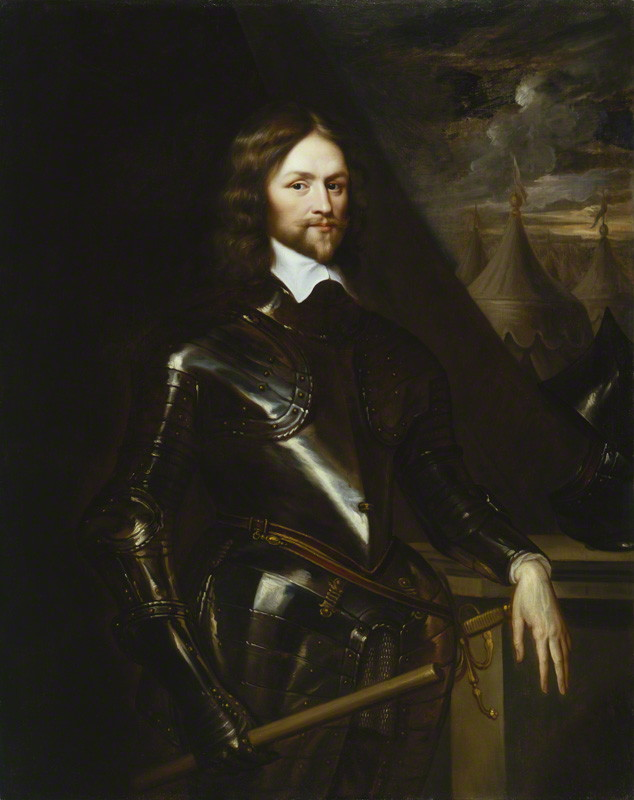
Cromwell's son-in-law Henry Ireton, who argued the Grandees position at the Putney Debates

In response, each regiment elected two representatives, or Agitators; along with senior officers like Sir Thomas Fairfax, known as the 'Grandees', these representatives formed the Army Council. After a meeting near Newmarket, Suffolk on Friday 4 June 1647, they issued "A Solemne Engagement of the Army, under the Command of his Excellency Sir Thomas Fairfax". Presented to Parliament on 8 June, it set out their grievances and explained the constitution of the Council, to make it clear these demands had wide-ranging support. Parliament responded by ordering the New Model to disband.

Concerned Parliament intended to restore Charles without preconditions, on 4 June the Council had him removed from his Parliamentary guards, and taken to Thriplow. He was now presented with The Heads of the Proposals, a set of conditions prepared by Cromwell and other senior officers; in many ways, they were more lenient than the Newcastle Propositions, particularly in their religious provisions. This not only created a rift between Parliament and the New Model but also between its senior officers and the rank and file, who viewed them as being far too moderate. Seeing an opportunity to divide his opponents, Charles rejected them; on 26 July, pro-Presbyterian rioters burst into Parliament, demanding he be invited to London.

In early August, Fairfax and the New Model took control of the city, which re-established command authority over the rank and file. However, with the majority of the New Model now based in or around London, the influence of the Levellers was strengthened; with their support, the Agitators prepared a revolutionary new constitution called the Agreement of the People. This contained demands for almost universal male suffrage, reform of electoral boundaries, supreme power to rest with the Parliament, religious freedom and an end to imprisonment for debt.

At the Putney Debates in late October and early November, Agitators discussed adoption of the 'Agreement' and the 'Proposals', with Cromwell's son-in-law Henry Ireton representing the Army Council. The Levellers pushed for a single meeting of the entire army, which would vote on which proposal to accept but were out manoeuvred by the Council, which insisted on three separate meetings. They used the delay to ensure adoption of the 'Proposals' by demanding every soldier sign a declaration of loyalty, to Fairfax and the Army Council, with signature signifying acceptance of the 'Proposals'. In return, they were promised their pay arrears in full; it was suggested divisions within the New Model could enable Parliament to delay or even refuse payment.

At the first meeting on 15 November, a minority refused, leading to the Corkbush Field mutiny, which was quickly suppressed; Private Richard Arnold was tried for mutiny and shot on the spot as an example. At the two other meetings at Ruislip and Kingston, the other regiments complied with orders to show support for Fairfax. The net result was the Army Council now became a political power, separate from either king or Parliament.

== Council of Officers ==
Over the following years the Army Council changed in constituency. The elected agitators were removed and the Council became an (Army) Council of Officers, remaining an important institution in the ruling establishment of the English Commonwealth and the Protectorate during the Interregnum. For example, at the start of the Protectorate, ten days after the dissolution of the Rump Parliament on 20 April 1653, Cromwell told the Council of State that it no longer existed and together with the Council of Officers, instituted a new Council of State.

== Sources ==
- Grayling, AC (2017). Democracy and its crisis. Oneworld Publications. ISBN 978-1-78607-289-4.
- Kishlansky, Mark A (1982). "What Happened at Ware?". The Historical Journal. 25 (4): 827–839. doi:10.1017/S0018246X00021245. JSTOR 2638633.
- Macleod, Donald (Autumn 2009). "The influence of Calvinism on politics". Theology in Scotland. XVI (2).
- Plant, David. "Heads of the Proposals". BCW Project.
- Rees, John (2016). The Leveller Revolution. Verso. ISBN 978-1784783907.
- Royle, Trevor (2004). Civil War: The Wars of the Three Kingdoms 1638–1660 (2006 ed.). Abacus. ISBN 978-0-349-11564-1.
- Scott, David. "The Independents and the Long Parliament, 1644–48". History of Parliament.
