= Battle of Winceby =

1643 battle of the First English Civil War

Coordinates: 53°12.1′N 0°1.9′W

- Part of the First English Civil War
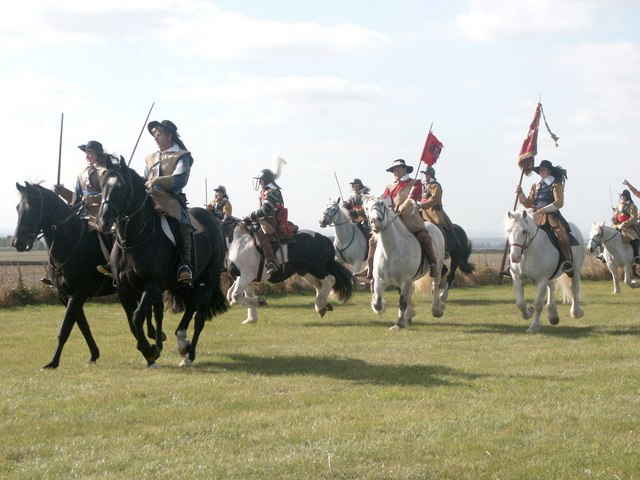
- Parliamentary cavalry at a re-enactment of the Battle of Winceby
Date	11 October 1643
Location	Winceby, Lincolnshire
Result	Parliamentarian victory

Belligerents
Royalists	Parliamentarians

Commanders and leaders
Sir William Widdrington; Sir John Henderson; Sir William Savile	Earl of Manchester; Oliver Cromwell

Strength
c. 2,500–3,000 horse	c. 3,000 horse c. 2,000 foot

Casualties and losses
200–300; 800 taken prisoner	c. 20 killed

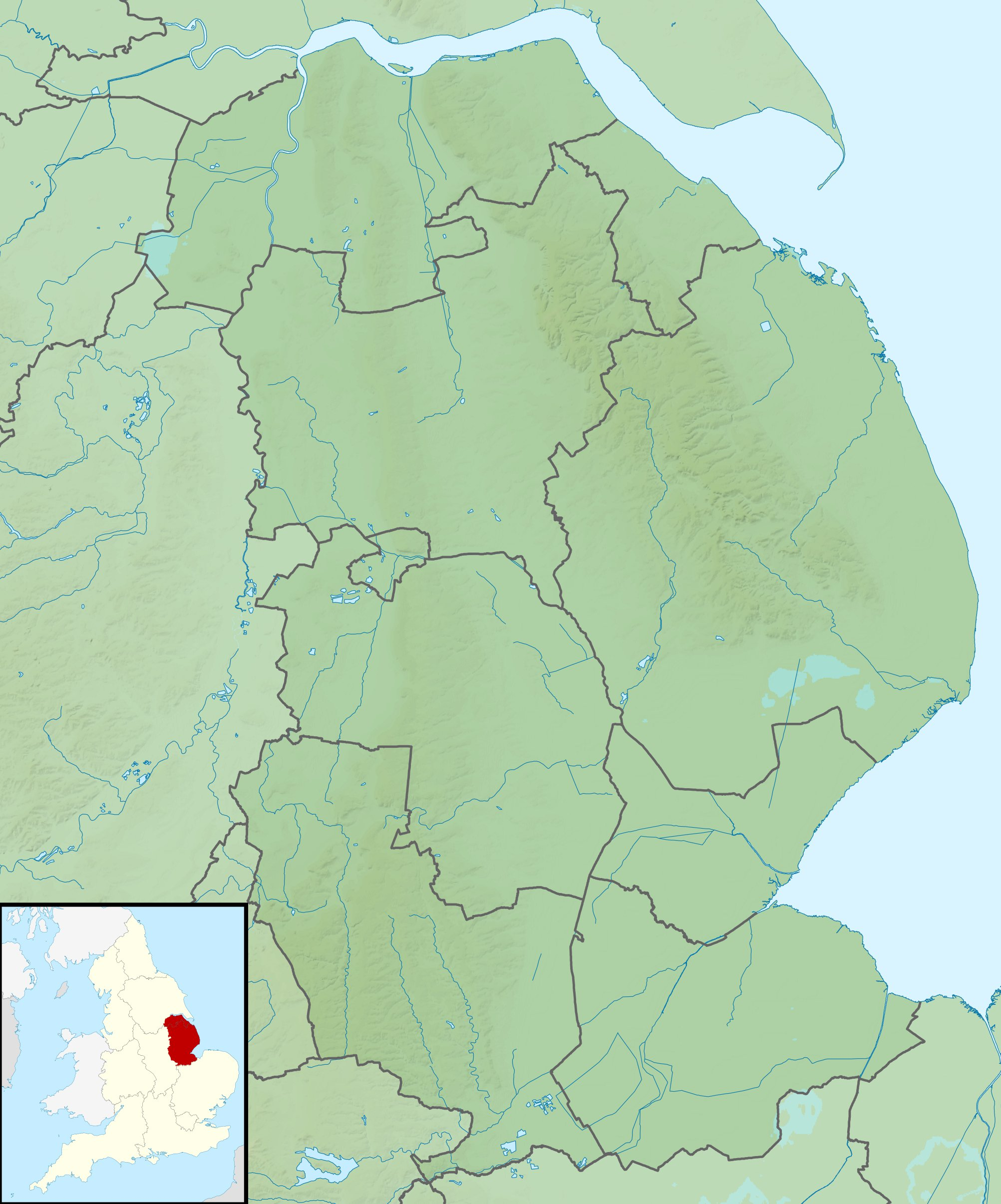
Lincolnshire and Winceby

The Battle of Winceby took place on 11 October 1643 during the First English Civil War near the village of Winceby, Lincolnshire. In the battle, a Royalist relieving force under the command of Sir William Widdrington was defeated by the Parliamentarian cavalry of the Earl of Manchester.

== Prelude ==
During the summer of 1643, the Royalists laid plans to win the war by marching on London. However, before this could be contemplated, it would be necessary for them to defeat the Parliamentarian forces holding Hull and Plymouth; otherwise, as the Royalist forces moved on London, the garrisons of those two towns could sortie out and attack the Royalist rear areas.

While these sieges were under way, King Charles decided to make the best use of his time by reducing Gloucester, the one great fortress of Parliament in the west. Parliamentary forces relieved Gloucester on 5 September. The relieving army was brought to battle by Royalist forces in the First Battle of Newbury; Newbury was a tactical draw but a strategic victory for the Parliamentarians as it reduced the likelihood of a Royalist attack on London.

Meanwhile, the Royalist army under the command of the Earl of Newcastle commenced a second siege of Hull on 2 September. The Eastern Association Parliamentarian forces led by the Earl of Manchester promptly initiated actions to relieve Hull. Manchester's forces began by besieging King's Lynn in Norfolk with his infantry while the Association's horse rode into the northern part of the county to give a hand to the Fairfaxes. At Hull, it was fortunate that egress to the city remained open and available by means of the River Humber.

On 18 September, part of the cavalry in Hull was ferried over to Barton, and the rest under Sir Thomas Fairfax went by sea to Saltfleet a few days later, the whole force joining Oliver Cromwell near Spilsby. In return, Lord Fairfax, who remained in Hull, received infantry reinforcements and a quantity of ammunition and stores from the Eastern Association.

With his forces collected and reorganised, Manchester and his cavalry forces next laid siege to the Royalist garrison at Bolingbroke Castle. In response, Newcastle ordered Sir William Widdrington to take a small force of cavalry and dragoons from Lincoln to confront Manchester and relieve the garrison.

== Battle ==
On 10 October at the town of Horncastle, approximately 6 miles west of Bolingbroke Castle, the Royalist force commanded by Widdrington came upon a cavalry detachment screening for the Parliamentarians sieging the Royalist garrison. A brief skirmish took place and the Parliamentarians withdrew. The Parliamentary detachment reported back to the main army that the Royalists were moving towards them.

The next day the two opposing forces simultaneously took steps to confront each other. Manchester took part of his force and arrayed them on Kirkby Hill to prevent the Bolingbroke garrison from leaving the castle and organizing an attack from the rear. With the remainder of his army, Manchester advanced towards Horncastle. Meanwhile, Widdrington and the Royalists moved out of Horncastle and advanced toward Bolingbroke Castle.

The Parliamentary horse, which moved faster than the infantry, met the Royalists advancing in the opposite direction at Winceby. The field of battle was not ideal as the land falls away into sharp gullies on one side, but it was not poor enough to prohibit a battle. The two forces were approximately the same size and composition, all cavalry.

The ensuing battle lasted about half an hour. Cromwell feigned a retreat and lured the Royalists from a good defensive position onto flat ground. A small party of Parliamentarians advanced on the Royalists who discharged their weapons at them. Cromwell then led his main body of horse in a charge hoping to press home his attack before the Royalists had time to reload but dismounted Royalist dragoons managed to fire a second volley, hitting several of the Ironsides. Cromwell had his horse shot from under him, apparently by Sir Ingram Hopton (who was himself killed in the subsequent fighting and is commemorated by a memorial canvas found above the font in St. Mary's Church, Horncastle). The canvas's inscription describes Cromwell as the 'Arch Rebel' and bears the incorrect date of October 6, 1643 for the Battle of Winceby.

Cromwell was only able to rejoin the battle after he had secured another mount. A Royalist cavalry division under Sir William Savile counterattacked Cromwell's right flank. The Royalists were, in turn, attacked in the flank by Sir Thomas Fairfax's horse. In the resulting melee, the Royalists lost cohesion when the command by Savile to about face was taken to be an order to retreat and Savile's horse fled the battle. On the Parliamentarian's left wing the Royalists enjoyed greater initial success, but the collapse of the Royalist left and centre meant that Widdrington had to retreat or face envelopment. A flanking attack by Cromwell's reformed cavalry was enough to cause the Royalists to flee the field in confusion.

In Horncastle, at a place now known as "slash hollow", some Royalists were killed or captured when they became trapped against a parish boundary gate that only opened one way (against them) and in their panic the press of men jammed it shut. For the remainder of the day the Parliamentarians hunted down Royalist stragglers not stopping until dusk, which in October occurs in early evening, when they were recalled by Manchester. The Royalists lost about 300 men and the Parliamentarians about 20 with a further 60 wounded.

On the same day, Newcastle's army near Hull, which had suffered terribly from the hardships of continuous siege work, was attacked by the garrison. They were so severely handled that the siege of Hull was given up the next day.

== Aftermath ==
Manchester left Bolingbroke Castle under siege and proceeded to retake Lincoln and Gainsborough. With all hope of relief gone, the garrison of Bolingbroke Castle surrendered on 14 November. Thus Lincolnshire, which had been almost entirely in Royalist hands before Newcastle undertook the siege of Hull, was given over to the control of the Parliamentarians.
