= Battle of Gainsborough =

1643 battle of the First English Civil War

Coordinates: 53.379°N 0.753°W

- Part of the First English Civil War
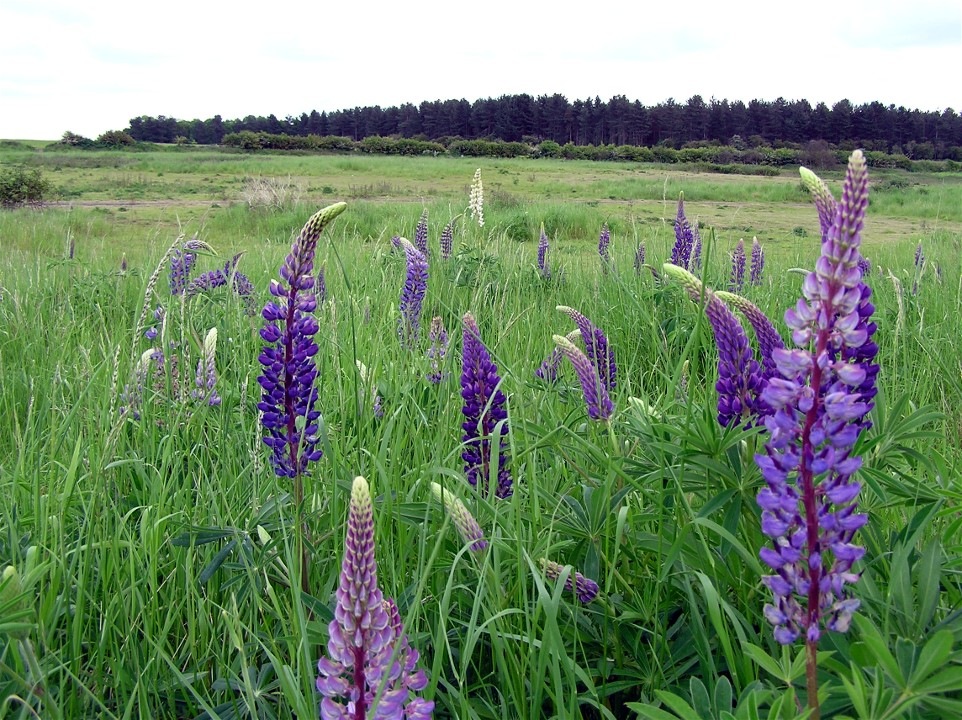
| Date | 28 July 1643 |
| Location | Gainsborough, Lincolnshire |
| Result | Parliamentarian victory |

Belligerents
| Royalists | Parliamentarians |

Commanders and leaders
| Charles Cavendish † | Sir John Meldrum; Colonel Oliver Cromwell |

Strength
| Unknown | 1,200 |

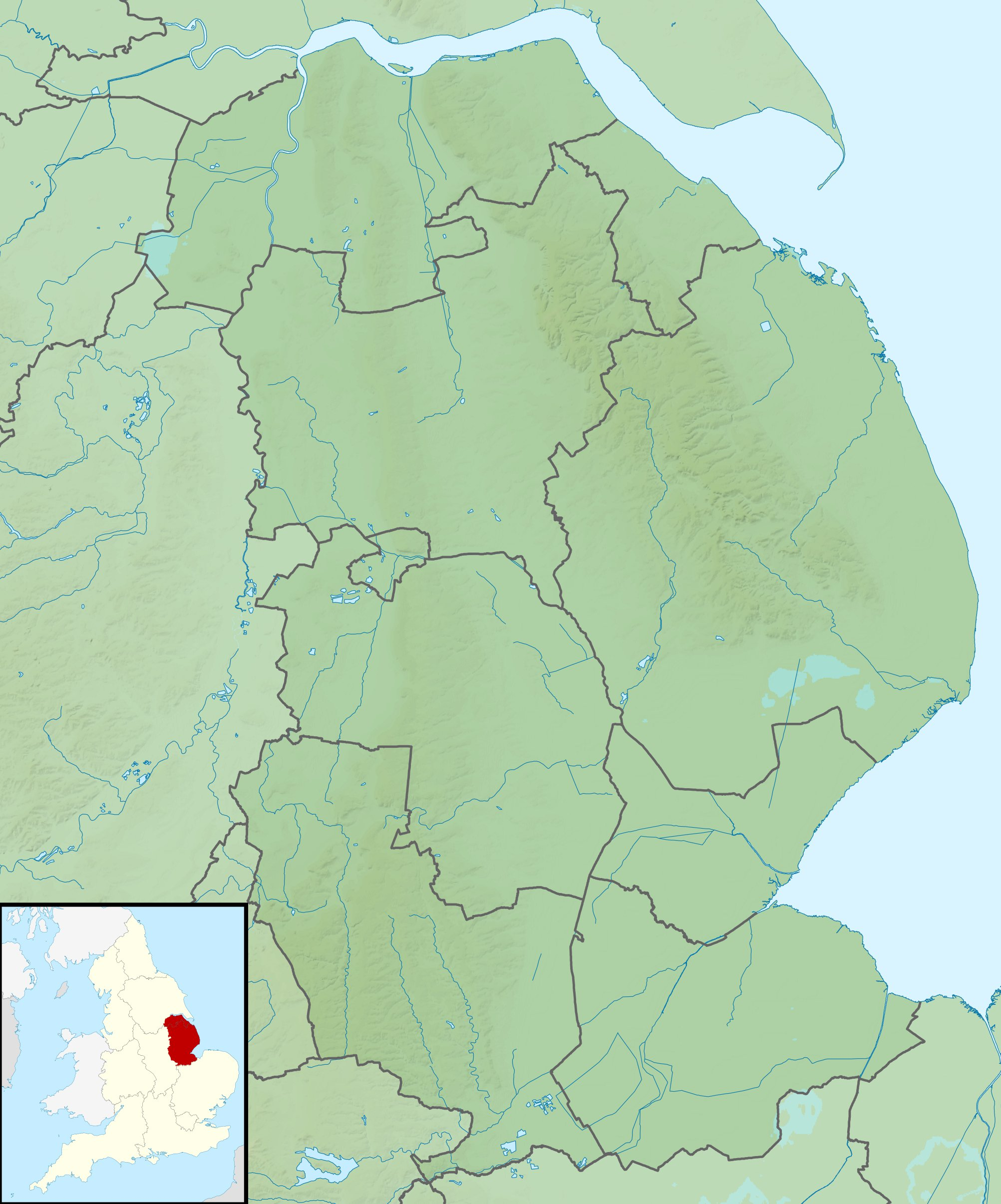
Lincolnshire County

The Battle of Gainsborough took place during the First English Civil War on 28 July 1643. The strategically important town of Gainsborough, Lincolnshire, was a Royalist base used for harassing the Parliamentarians who were generally dominant in Lincolnshire, but it was taken by Parliamentarians in July 1643. An attempt to recapture Gainsborough by Charles Cavendish and the Royalists was foiled in a battle in which Colonel Oliver Cromwell distinguished himself as a cavalry leader.

== Prelude ==
When the English Civil War was declared, Gainsborough in Lincolnshire lay in an area which supported Parliament, but the town itself had Royalist sympathies. The town was of strategic importance to both sides, sited as it was on a crossing of the River Trent and lying on important roads leading north and south. In March 1643, Sir John Henderson sent a raiding party from the Royalist base at Newark to capture Gainsborough for King Charles. The town was surrounded and quickly surrendered without any resistance.

The town was put into the charge of the Earl of Kingston and was used as a base to harass the Parliamentarians in Lincolnshire. Royalist attacks at Louth and Market Rasen, together with the capture of gunpowder intended for Rotherham, provoked Parliament into action. Lord Willoughby of Parham launched a surprise night attack on Gainsborough on 16 July 1643 and captured the town. The Earl of Kingston was later killed by a round shot from his own men as he was being taken as a prisoner down the river to Hull.

It seemed, however, that Willoughby's triumph might be short-lived. The Royalists immediately sent Charles Cavendish with a force to siege and retake Gainsborough. The Parliamentarians responded by sending relieving forces to Gainsborough from Nottingham under Sir John Meldrum and from Cambridgeshire under Colonel Oliver Cromwell. The two forces met on 27 July at North Scarle, ten miles south of Gainsborough, and were joined by a detachment from Lincoln.

== Battle ==
The next day, 28 July 1643, the 1,200 strong Parliamentarian force marched north. At the village of Lea, just south of Gainsborough, the Parliamentarians met a Royalist advanced guard of 100 horse, part of Cavendish's army. After a short skirmish, the Royalists were driven back to Cavendish's main body of horse which was drawn up on top of Foxby Hill to the east of Gainsborough. The Parliamentarian troops pressed on, advanced up Foxby Hill, and came face-to-face with Cavendish's main force. After a period of fierce fighting, the Royalists began to fall back, eventually fleeing from the battlefield pursued by the Parliamentary cavalry.

Cromwell then noticed that Cavendish had held a regiment of horse in reserve and was now moving to counter-attack those Parliamentarians that had remained on the field. Seeing this, Cromwell, Major Whalley and three troops of Parliamentarian horse attacked Cavendish and his reserve from the rear. Cromwell and his troopers forced Cavendish's horse down the hill into the flat marshy land of the Trent, where 300 Royalists were slaughtered. Cavendish was knocked off his horse and killed by a sword thrust in the chest. The place where he was killed was later known as "Candish Bog."

== Aftermath ==
With the battle over, Cromwell rode into Gainsborough with supplies for Willoughby's garrison. While this was being done, news arrived that a small Royalist force was marching on Gainsborough from the north. Cromwell and Meldrum, thinking this was a remnant of Cavendish's force not yet engaged, rode out to meet them with 600 of Willoughby's foot soldiers.

At Morton they drove off two troops of Royalist horse. Then climbing a hill, they were shocked to discover the army of Lord Newcastle consisting of about 30 regiments of foot and a great body of horse, who were marching on Gainsborough to retake it for the King. Willoughby's foot soldiers fell back in disorder. With his own men and horses exhausted by the recent battle, Cromwell ordered a withdrawal. In a disciplined manoeuvre, two rearguard parties of horse, one from Cromwell's regiment and another from Lincoln, stood firm and retired alternately in order to cover the main force. With the loss of only two men, they held back the Royalists until reaching the safety of Lincoln.

Meanwhile, Newcastle besieged Gainsborough, firing on the town with his cannons. After a three-day siege, Willoughby surrendered on 31 July. Newcastle then turned his forces around and headed north to besiege Hull, leaving a Royalist garrison at Gainsborough. With the town back in Royalist hands, raiding parties once more started to harass Parliamentary-held areas.

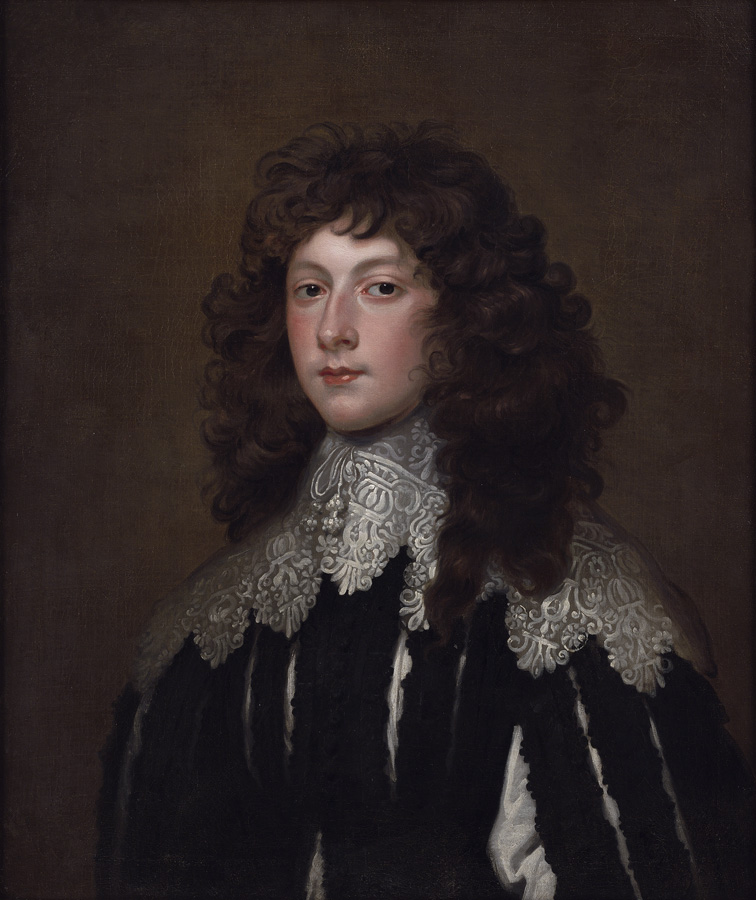
Charles Cavendish, Royalist commander at the Battle of Gainsborough

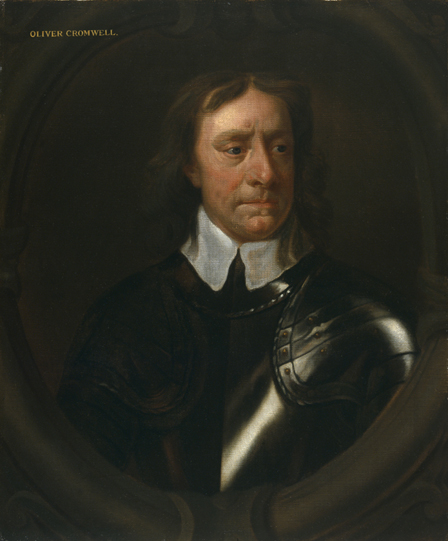
Oliver Cromwell, Parliamentarian commander at the Battle of Gainsborough

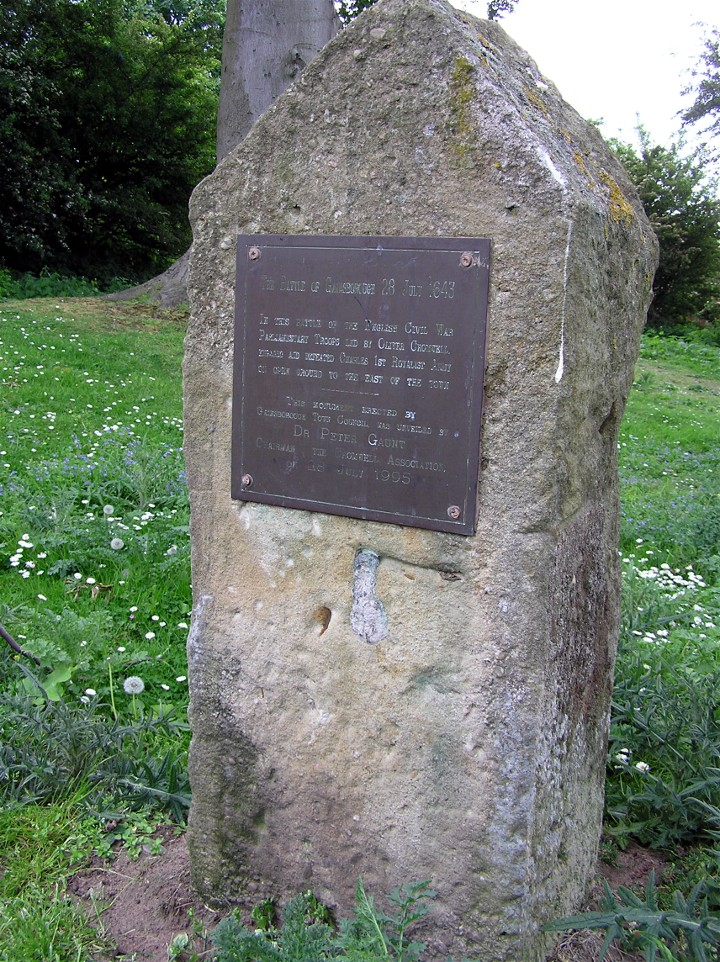
Battlefield Monument at the bottom of Foxby Hill, Gainsborough

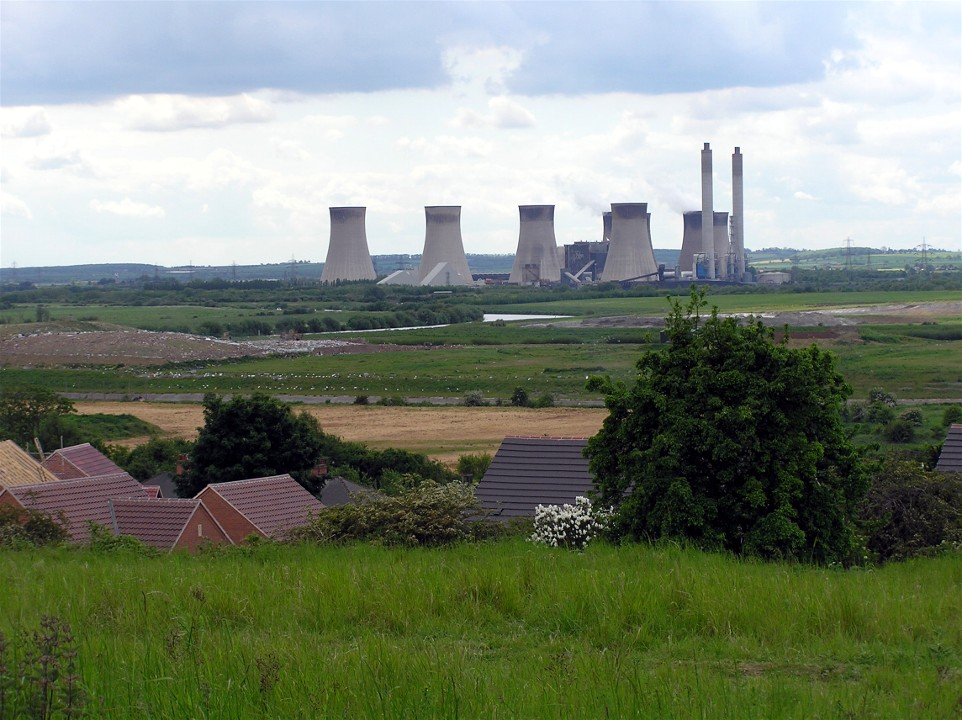
View west from the summit of Foxby Hill towards the River Trent where the battle's climax took place
