= Eastern Association =

Parliamentarian group of counties in the English Civil War

The Eastern Association of counties was an administrative organisation set up by Parliament in the early years of the First English Civil War. Its main function was to finance and support an army which became a mainstay of the Parliamentarian military effort until early 1645. In January 1644 committeemen of the Eastern Association gathered at the Bury Conference to discuss their concerns as regards the proposed New Model Army. However, in the following months many of its units were incorporated into this new military formation, and the Association officially ceased to exist in July 1645.

== Foundation ==
As part of Parliament's efforts to improve the administration of its forces, the Parliamentarian militias of Essex, Hertfordshire, Norfolk, Suffolk, Cambridgeshire were established as the "Eastern Association" on 20 December 1642. Huntingdonshire and Lincolnshire later joined the Association. The first general designated as commander of the Association's forces was William Grey, 1st Baron Grey of Werke. One of the first units which first became part of the Association's force was a Captain Oliver Cromwell's Troop of Horse.

The counties which composed the Eastern Association were some of the richest agricultural regions of England, so the Association's forces were some of the best financed and equipped troops on either side in the early part of the civil war. During the winter of 1642–43, it established Parliamentary control over East Anglia. The Grand Committee of the Eastern Association, and its different sub-committees, sat in the Bear Inn in Cambridge throughout 1643 and 1644.

== Development ==
In August 1643, Lord Grey was replaced as commander by the Earl of Manchester. Oliver Cromwell was appointed Lieutenant General of the Horse. The two men clashed, especially over Cromwell's selection of officers. Manchester wrote, "Colonel Cromwell raising of his regiment makes choice of his officers not such as were soldiers or men of estate, but such as were common men, poor and of mean parentage, only he would give them the title of godly, precious men..." Late in 1643, Lawrence Crawford was appointed Sergeant-Major General of the Foot. He too frequently clashed with Cromwell.

Manchester soon appointed his provost-marshal, William Dowsing, as a paid iconoclast, touring the churches of Suffolk and Cambridgeshire destroying all "Popish" and "superstitious" imagery, as well as features such as altar-rails.

For much of 1643, the Association was engaged in battles against the Northern royalists to secure Lincolnshire for Parliament. The Royalists were defeated at Gainsborough and Winceby. There was a brief diversion that year into Suffolk to put down a royalist uprising in Lowestoft.

In May 1644, the Association's forces besieged Lincoln, the last Royalist post in Lincolnshire. When it was captured, the Association's army was free to join the Parliamentarian army under Lord Fairfax and the Scottish Covenanters under the Earl of Leven in the Siege of York. On 1 July, the besiegers were outmanoeuvred by Prince Rupert of the Rhine, who skirted them and reached the city.

The next day however, Rupert chose to engage them even though he was outnumbered. In the resulting Battle of Marston Moor, all of Fairfax's army and half the Scots fled. However, Manchester's infantry and especially the Eastern Association cavalry under Cromwell stood firm. Cromwell's cavalry - aided by Covenanter regiments - first drove off Royalist cavalry on their side of the field. Showing discipline they rallied beyond the Royalist forces and then attacked the Royalist cavalry under Goring on the other side and routed the Royalists from the field. The siege of York was resumed and the city fell to Parliamentarians on 16 July.

Later in the year, the Eastern Association forces moved into the south of England where the Parliamentarian armies under the Earl of Essex and Sir William Waller had suffered setbacks. After the drawn Second battle of Newbury, Manchester was severely criticised by Cromwell for what was seen to be half-hearted leadership.

The Eastern Association army had been carrying much of the burden of the war and on 19 November 1644, the Association announced that it could no longer bear the cost of maintaining its army. This prompted Parliament to decree the formation of the New Model Army. Four cavalry and four infantry regiments of the Eastern Association army were absorbed into the New Model, and became the pattern on which most of the other units were formed. At the same time, the criticism of the Earls of Manchester and Essex resulted in the Self-denying Ordinance, which placed command of the New Model Army in the hands of professional soldiers.

=== Military personnel of the Eastern Association ===
- Major-General: Edward Montagu, 2nd Earl of Manchester
- Lieutenant-General of Horse: Oliver Cromwell
- Sergeant Major-General of Foot: Lawrence Crawford
- Commissionary-General: Bartholomew Vermuyden
- Quartermaster-General: Henry Ireton
- Lieutenant-Colonel of Dragoons: John Lilburne

=== Regiments within the Army of the Eastern Association ===
Cavalry

- The Earl of Manchester's
- Cromwell's Ironsides
- Bartholomew Vermuyden's
- Charles Fleetwood's
- Sir John Norwich's (temporarily for the Second Battle of Newbury, while Fleetwood's stayed in the Eastern counties)

Infantry

- The Earl of Manchester's
- Lawrence Crawford's
- Edward Montagu's
- Sir Miles Hobart's
- John Pickering's
- Francis Russell's
- Thomas Rainsborough's
- John Lilburne's
- Valentine Walton Snr's

Dragoons

- The Earl of Manchester's
- John Lilburne's
- Bartholomew Vermuyden's
