= London Trained Bands =

Auxiliary Military force in London

- The arms of the City of London
- Active: 1559–1794
- Country: England 1559–1707; Great Britain 1707–1794
- Branch: Trained Bands/Militia
- Role: Infantry
- Size: 4–6 Regiments + 6 Auxiliary Regiments
- Garrison/HQ: City of London
- March: My Lady Greensleeves (alleged)
- Anniversaries: 20 September (Newbury)
- Engagements: Suppression of Essex's Rebellion; Battle of Turnham Green; First Battle of Newbury; Siege of Basing House; Battle of Alton; Battle of Cheriton; Battle of Cropredy Bridge; Battle of Lostwithiel; Second Battle of Newbury; Suppression of Venner's Rising; Suppression of Gordon Riots

Commanders
- Notable commanders: Martin Bond; Philip Skippon; Sir Richard Browne; Sir James Harrington

The London Trained Bands (LTBs) were a part-time military force in the City of London from 1559 until they were reconstituted as conventional Militia regiments in 1794. They were periodically embodied for home defence, for example in the army mustered at Tilbury during the Armada Campaign of 1588. They saw a great deal of active service during the English Civil War, including the First and Second Battles of Newbury, and the battles of Alton, Cheriton, Cropredy Bridge and Lostwithiel. Throughout their history they were used to suppress civil disorder and insurrection around the capital.

== Early history ==
The English militia was descended from the Anglo-Saxon Fyrd, the military force raised from the freemen of the shires under command of their Sheriff. It continued under the Norman kings, notably at the Battle of the Standard (1138). The force was reorganised under the Assizes of Arms of 1181 and 1252, and again by King Edward I's Statute of Winchester of 1285. Levies from London were engaged at the Battle of Lewes in 1264, and defended the city in the Siege of London in 1471 during the Wars of the Roses.

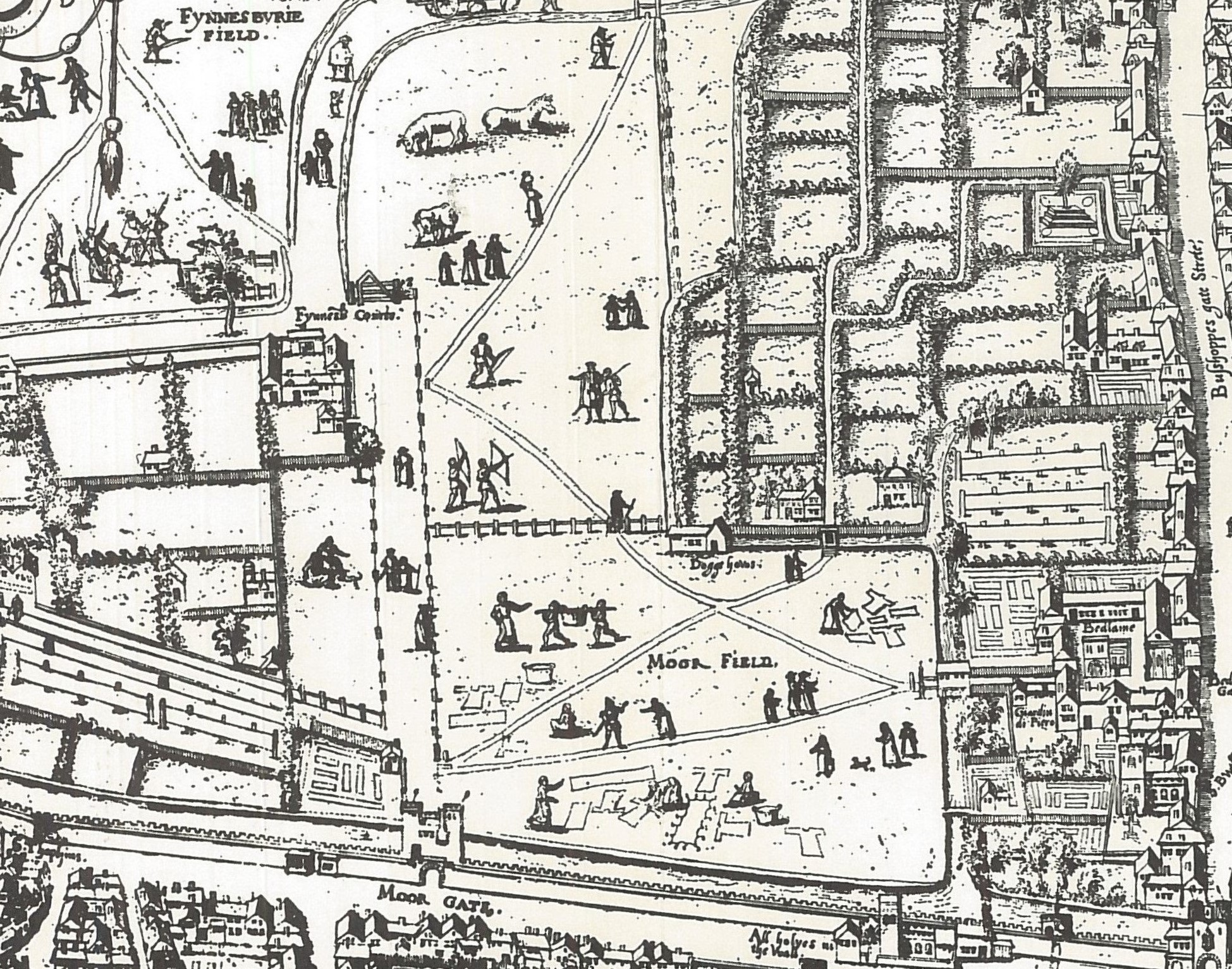
Moorgate in the 1550s, showing archery practice in Moorfields and Finsbury Fields.

King Henry VIII strengthened the military capability of the country: in Acts of 1511 (An Act concerning shooting in Long Bows., 3 Hen. 8. c. 3), 1514 (6 Hen. 8. c. 2) and 1541 (The Unlawful Games Act), Parliament reiterating the obligation on boys aged from 7 and upwards, and all men of military age, to practise archery (with English longbows, not crossbows) and for all towns and villages to set up Archery butts. Moorfields and Finsbury Fields were popular archery grounds for Londoners. In 1537 Henry issued a charter to the Fraternity of St George whereby the citizens of London could practise with 'artillery' (longbows, crossbows and handguns), and in 1539 he called out a 'Great Muster' across the country, when the 16,000-strong 'Citie Forces' marched through London from their muster at Mile End and Stepney.

== London Trained Bands ==
The legal basis of the Shire levy was updated by two acts of 1557 (4 & 5 Ph. & M. cc. 2 and 3), which placed the county militia under a Lord Lieutenant appointed by the monarch. The entry into force of these Acts in 1558 is seen as the starting date for the organised county militia in England. Regulations for mustering the militia of the City of London were issued by Queen Elizabeth I in 1559. The elected Lord Mayor and Aldermen fulfilled the roles of Lord Lieutenant and appointed the officers.

Although the militia obligation was universal, it was clearly impractical to train and equip every able-bodied man, so after 1572 the practice was to select a proportion of men for the Trained Bands, who were mustered for regular drills. Even so, there was resistance throughout the country to the costs involved, especially for firearms and training ammunition, and when London tried to get its quota of 2000 'shot' reduced to 500 in 1574, the government increased it to 4000. To reach that total the Court of Aldermen had to exert pressure on the city livery companies to raise the necessary money. In 1586 the responsibility for the London Trained Bands was shifted from the livery companies to the Wards of the City of London.

In theory the Trained Bands met for a day's training in each of the summer months, but for most of the country this was perfunctory, and they were in fact Untrained Bands, who would not serve outside their own district. Londoners often made fun of the Trained Bands and their sham fights at Mile End (Beaumont and Fletcher ridiculed them in their 1607 play The Knight of the Burning Pestle), but London was in fact the exception to the rule: its regiments were well trained, capable of putting up a stout defence, and the men were even prepared to leave their businesses for short campaigns. Under Queen Elizabeth I the Fraternity of St George had developed into the 'Artillery Company of London' (later the Honourable Artillery Company, HAC) with a drill ground and firing ranges at the Old Artillery Garden outside the city walls at Spitalfields. It attracted keen citizens who learned drill and studied the military arts as a hobby under the tutelage of hired professional captains. The Artillery Company and similar groups such as the Military Garden in St Martin's Fields provided much of the officer corps for the LTBs and ensured that they were among the best-trained and equipped in the country.

=== Tilbury muster ===
With the outbreak of the Anglo-Spanish War (1585–1604), training and equipping the militia became a priority. By early 1588 the LTBs were training twice-weekly before the Armada Crisis led to the mobilisation of the trained bands on 23 July. At this time the LTBs were organised as follows:

East Regiment

- Portsoken
- Aldgate
- Tower – from Aldgate
- Tower – from the Tower itself
- Billingsgate
- Billingsgate – from Billingsgate and Bridge
- Bridge – from Bridge and Langbourn
- Langbourn
- Lime Street – from Lime Street, Langbourn and Bishopsgate
- Bishopsgate

North Regiment

- Cornhill – from Cornhill, Bishopsgate and Broad Street
- Broad Street
- Coleman Street – from Coleman Street and Broad Street
- Bassishaw – from Bassishaw, Broad Street and Cripplegate
- Cripplegate – 3 Companies
- Liberty of St Martin-le-Grand – from St Martin-le-Grand, Cripplegate and Farringdon Within
- Aldersgate
- Cheapside

West Regiment

- Farringdon Within – 3 Companies
- Cheapside – from Cheapside, Farringdon Within and Castle Baynard
- Farringdon Without – 5 Companies
- Castle Baynard

South Regiment

- Castle Baynard – from Castle Baynard and Queenhithe
- Queenhithe
- Bread Street – from Bread Street and Queenhithe
- Bread Street – from Bread Street and Vintry
- Dowgate
- Cordwainer – from Cordwainer and Vintry
- Cordwainer – from Cordwainer and Dowgate
- Vintry
- Walbrook
- Candlewick

In total the 40 City companies, each with an establishment of 150 men, comprised 2000 pikemen and 4000 armed with the caliver, a kind of light musket. In addition the 'Out Liberties' of the Tower Hamlets, Westminster and Southwark provided a further 5 companies with 350 pikes and 750 calivers. (Another breakdown of the LTBs' weapons in April 1588 listed 1000 muskets, 2000 pikes, 2400 calivers and 600 bills, with 4000 armed but untrained men listed as pioneers). It appears that the City regiments were temporary – no colonels were appointed (except to the Tower Hamlets and Westminster contingents) – and the 40 companies were the sole permanent organisations. Formally, the Southwark Trained Bands were under the Lord Lieutenant of Surrey, but since 1550 the heart of the borough had formed Bridge Without ward of the city, and its regiment generally cooperated with the LTBs.

The LTBs marched out behind their captains and ensigns to join the great camp at Tilbury where Queen Elizabeth gave her Tilbury speech on 9 August. It appears that the job of watching the walls and gates of the city was left to the 4000 armed but untrained men. Captain Martin Bond of the Aldersgate Company was one of those present at Tilbury. He later became 'Chief Captain' of the LTB and the first President of the Court of Assistants of the Artillery Company. After the defeat of the Armada, the army at Tilbury was dispersed and the Trained Bands returned to their homes. They continued to train, but by the 1599 muster the numbers from the 25 wards and the out-liberty of St Martin-le-Grand had fallen to 1150 pikes and 2225 calivers.

=== 1599–1642 ===
The LTBs were next called into service during Essex's Rebellion in 1601. Robert Devereux, 2nd Earl of Essex, believed that he had the support of 1000 men of the LTBs under Sheriff Thomas Smyth, captain of the Billingsgate and Broad Street company, but when he and his followers went to Smyth's house they found no support, and on returning to Ludgate their way was barred by the LTBs. Essex ordered his followers to charge, but several of them were killed in the skirmish that followed. Essex was captured shortly afterwards. The LTBs were reinforced by the Trained Bands of Buckinghamshire, Essex, Hertfordshire and Surrey to guard the suburbs against disorder during Essex's trial and subsequent execution. Similarly, the accession of King James I in 1603 saw 100 Surrey trained bandsmen summoned to help guard the City of Westminster during the coronation.

The militia was neglected during James's reign, but in 1614 the Privy Council ordered the Lord Mayor to muster the LTBs, inspect the weapons and fill vacancies. In 1616 the four regiments were formally established (with slightly different recruiting areas), each consisting of five companies of 300 men. Until the late 1630s the LTBs' duties were largely ceremonial, or to maintain order amongst the unruly apprentices during holidays. It appears that the annual muster was the only regular training for the LTBs, but the officers were active in the HAC and the growing number of other military societies.

Trained bands were called out in 1639 and 1640 for the Bishops' Wars, The LTBs were ordered to muster in Spring 1639 and the king demanded 3000 selected men for his projected campaign. However, the City asserted the right that its trained bands could not be compelled to serve outside London. The following year the city was ordered to levy 4000 men for the next campaign, but they were not to be drawn from the trained bands. Instead, the LTBs were to secure the suburbs where riots against Royal policies were becoming frequent (though the men were reluctant to act against the rioters with whom they sympathised). As the crisis worsened, the LTBs did duty at Westminster for long periods, for example for 55 days and 10 nights during the trial of the Earl of Strafford.

There is an often-repeated story that when Charles I returned from his Scottish campaign in October 1641 he ordered the guards on Parliament sitting at Westminster, which were provided by the city, Surrey and Middlesex TBs under command of the Puritan Robert Devereux, 3rd Earl of Essex, to be replaced by the Westminster TBs (many of whose tradesmen members were purveyors to the Royal Court) under the command of the Royalist Earl of Dorset, and that subsequently there were clashes between the new guards and the London apprentices. However, this story has been refuted in the most detailed history of the LTBs, which points out that the guards were provided by the Westminster TBs all along, supported by the other Middlesex TBs and it was only the commanders who were exchanged. The clashes between TBs and apprentices may have been orchestrated by the anti-Royalist faction in Parliament, especially the City of London MP John Venn (captain of the Cripplegate Within company and in the HAC). The LTBs, meanwhile, were maintaining order in the City itself. Later, the House of Commons did petition the king for a guard from the LTBs, which was denied.

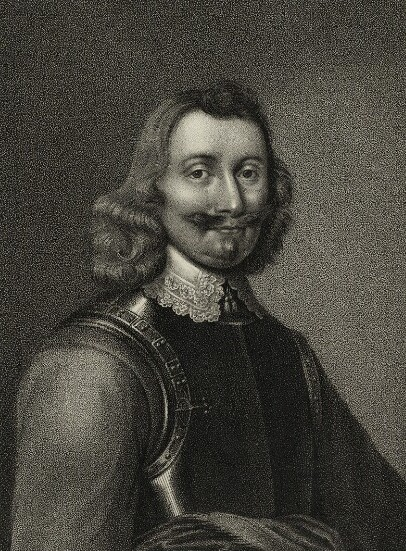
Engraving (not contemporary) of Philip Skippon.

The standoff between King and Parliament over control of the TBs across the country was one of the major points of dispute that led to the First English Civil War. Parliament was now issuing orders direct to a committee of the Common Council of London over the objections of the Royalist Lord Mayor and aldermen, including imposing Philip Skippon as commander of the LTBs. Skippon had been Chief Captain (later Captain-General) of the HAC since 1639 and now became Sergeant-Major-General of the LTBs. After Charles failed to arrest the leaders of the opposition in Parliament (the Five Members) and then fled London, Skippon led a parade of eight companies of the LTBs down the Strand to honour the returning five members. He also seized the Tower of London (guarded by the Tower Hamlets TBs and was given joint authority (with the Sheriff of Surrey) over the Southwark Trained Bands.

On 12 February 1642 the Common Council increased the LTBs to 40 companies of 200 men, now organised in six rather than four regiments, and under the authority of the Militia Committee rather than the Lord Mayor. The new regiments took their names from the colour of their ensigns, and took their precedence from the seniority of the aldermen who were appointed as their colonels. A large number of new officers were appointed, mainly from the HAC. The regiments were organised as follows:

- Red Regiment, Col Thomas Atkins (7 companies) – east and south-east of the city: Aldgate, Mark Lane, Tower Street, Billingsgate and Portsoken
- White Regiment, Col Isaac Penington (7 companies) – north of the city: Cornhill, Lombard Street, Fenchurch Street, upper Gracechurch Street
- Yellow Regiment, Sir John Wollaston (7 companies) – west and central City: Cheapside, St Paul's Churchyard, part of Watling Street, part of Newgate Market, Ludgate, and Blackfriars
- Blue Regiment, Col Thomas Adams (7 companies) – south-central City: part of Thames Street, Dowgate. Walbrook, Friday Street, part of Watling Street
- Green Regiment, Col John Warner (6 companies) – north-central City: Coleman Street, Bassishaw, Cripplegate
- Orange Regiment, Col John Towse (6 companies) – west of the city: Farringdon Without, St Dunstan's in the West, and the Temple

The first muster of the six regiments was held on 10 May 1642 as a public celebration attended by thousands of Londoners and members of both Houses of Parliament.

== Civil War ==
Once the First English Civil War broke out in 1642, neither side made much further use of the Trained Bands outside London except as a source of recruits and weapons for their own full-time regiments. A number of regiments in the Earl of Essex's Parliamentary army were wholly or partly recruited in London, and it is safe to assume that a proportion of the men and certainly some of the officers were members or former members of the LTBs and HAC. Many of the other recruits were apprentices, promised freedom from their indentures at the completion of their service. These regiments included Col Sir John Merrick's Regiment of Foot, the 'London Greycoats', Col Lord Brooke's Regiment of Foot (purple coats) and Col Denzil Holles' Regiment of Foot (red coats), and Col Richard Browne's Regiment of Dragoons. The departure of Essex's army in September was another excuse for an LTB parade and civic occasion.

However, Parliament was lucky also to retain the reliable LTBs in hand as a strategic reserve. John Venn was sent with a detachment of 12 companies of the LTBs (two from each regiment) to secure Windsor Castle, for Parliament. The Berkshire and Surrey TBs soon arrived to take over garrisoning the castle under Venn and the LTBs returned home on 25 October. Venn's permanent regiment, recruited in London and officered by former LTB officers, arrived to garrison Windsor four days later. When Prince Rupert arrived with the advance guard of the Royalist army on 7 November after the inconclusive Battle of Edgehill, Windsor rejected his summons and he continued towards London, joining the King's main body at Brentford, west of the city, on 11 November.

=== Battle of Turnham Green ===
Essex's army had reached London first, and held Brentford. Rupert attacked the village early on 12 November (the Battle of Brentford) and destroyed the two regiments of Brooke and Holles. Next day Skippon gave a speech to the LTBs and led them out to Turnham Green where they went into the line alongside's Essex's battered and weary regiments.

Come my boys, my brave boys, let us pray heartily and fight heartily. I will run the same fortunes and hazards with you. Remember the Cause is for God; and for the defence of your selves, your wives, and children. Come my honest brave boys, pray heartily, and God will bless us.

Skippon to the London Trained Bands, 13 November 1642

The King's army found itself outnumbered and out-gunned; after a day facing Essex and Skippon, it retired to Hounslow under cover of darkness rather than make a frontal attack. The Battle of Turnham Green had ended with barely a shot fired.

Unsure of Royalist intentions, three of the LTB regiments were warned to go to Blackheath to link up with the Kent TBs to prevent an incursion into that county from south of London. Instead the Royalists withdrew to Reading and then Oxford, where they established winter quarters within a ring of garrisons. From his advanced HQ at Windsor, Essex also disposed his regular troops to cover the western approaches to London, while the LTBs returned to their homes. The City reluctantly allowed Skippon to be seconded to Essex's army as Sergeant-Major-General of Foot.

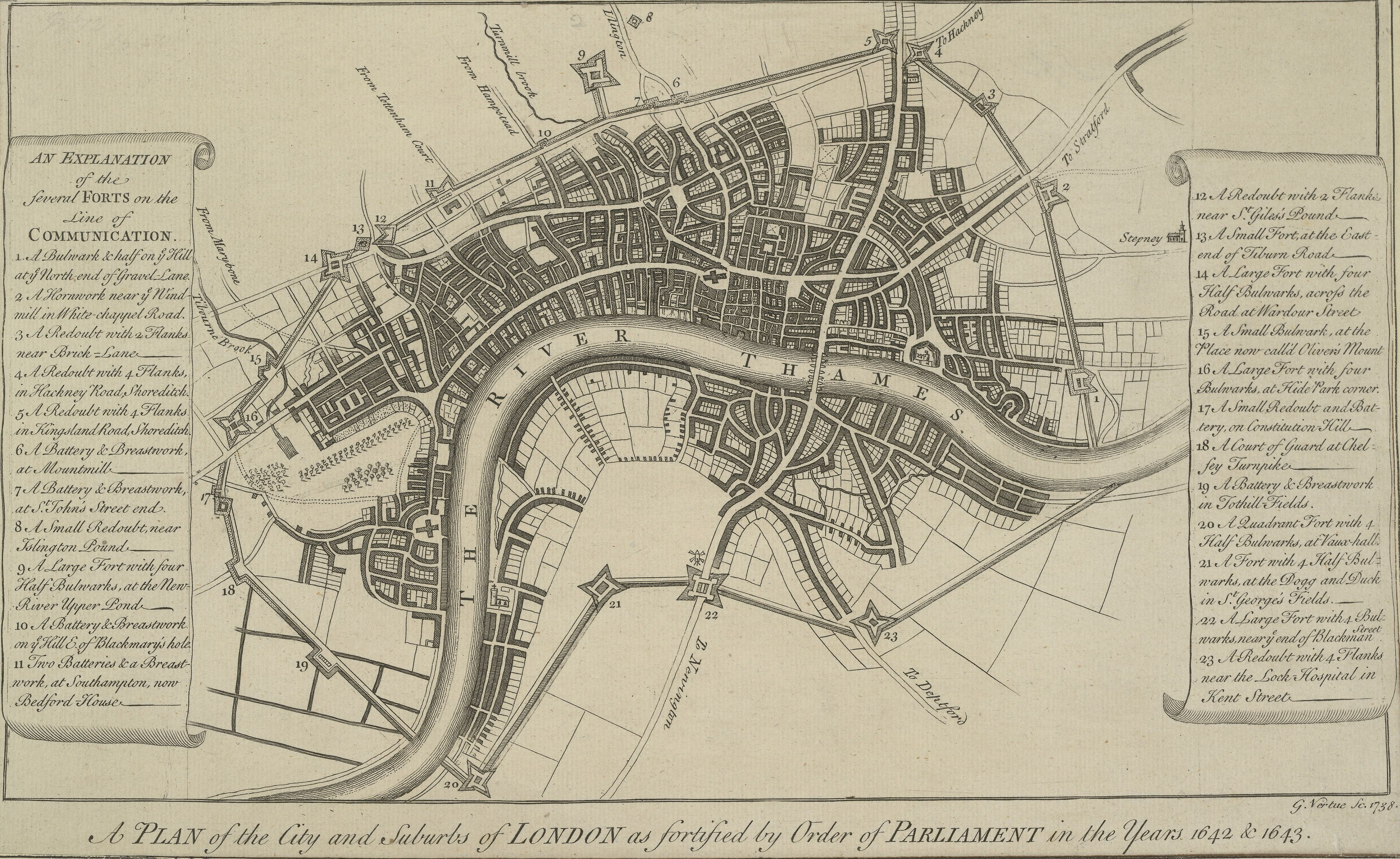
George Vertue's 1738 plan of the London Lines of Communication

=== Lines of communication ===
London had long outgrown the old city walls. During the Edgehill campaign the citizens had erected breastworks across all the streets leading to open country and set up guard posts manned by the LTBs – 20 companies were on duty each night. During the winter of 1642–3 volunteer work gangs of citizens constructed a massive entrenchment and rampart round the city and its suburbs. On the north bank of the Thames it enclosed the whole of Westminster and the Tower Hamlets as far as Whitechapel and Wapping; on the south, it ran from Vauxhall to Rotherhithe, enclosing Lambeth and Bermondsey as well as the whole of Southwark. Known as the Lines of Communication, studded with some 23 forts and redoubts, these defences were about 11 miles (18 km) long, making it the most extensive series of city defences in 17th century Europe. The Lines were completed by May 1643 and the City and suburban TB companies took their turns in manning the forts and key points: seven companies for the north side, two for the south side, one for Westminster, one company at the Royal Exchange, half a company at St Paul's and half a company at Tower Hill.

=== London Auxiliaries ===
Manning these fortifications day and night was a considerable drain on the existing TBs and would prevent them taking the field in numbers. In 1643 the City raised six additional regiments, the Auxiliaries, with the same colours and effectively acting as second battalions of the original regiments, with some officers holding dual appointments. The property qualification for participation was relaxed, so that apprentices and younger men who were not householders could serve. The weapons were supplied by the livery companies and the East India Company. The regiments were organised as follows:

- Red Auxiliaries, (7 companies)
- White Auxiliaries, (7 companies)
- Yellow Auxiliaries (8 companies)
- Blue Auxiliaries, (7 companies)
- Green Auxiliaries (the Cripplegate Auxiliaries), (7 companies)
- Orange Auxiliaries, (7 companies)

The suburbs of Westminster, Southwark and the Tower Hamlets similarly raised auxiliary TBs. When the London Militia Committee took over full responsibility for the City and Suburbs in August 1643, it controlled 18 regiments of Foot, about 20,000 men at full strength. Not all could be called away at once – the need to man the defences and continue the economic life of the City precluded that – but during the active campaigning season the regiments took turns to do tours of duty in the field, receiving pay for a month.

In addition there were the City Horse of 6 Troops, raised from October 1642, though it is not clear whether their service was full- or part-time. These were formed into a regiment in early 1643 and a second regiment was authorised in August. Lieutenant-Colonel Randall Mainwaring of the Red Regiment of TBs also commanded a regular regiment of foot (Mainwaring's Redcoats) recruited from and normally stationed in London. As Sergeant-Major-General of the City in succession to Skippon, Mainwaring used the City Horse and his Redcoats for police duties.

At the end of May 1643 the LTBs and Auxiliaries were called upon to seize the suspects in Edmund Waller's plot and to guard the prisons and subsequent executions. On 20 July 1643, Col Richard Browne of the Dragoons led Mainwaring's Redcoats and the Green Auxiliaries to break up an assembly of Royalists at Sevenoaks in Kent. The Royalists retreated to Tonbridge where there was a three-hour skirmish on 24 July, when they were driven out of town and 200 were captured. Both regiments returned to London on 29 July, carrying the captured weapons.

=== Relief of Gloucester and Battle of Newbury ===
During the summer of 1643 the Royalists made great strides in the West Country, storming the vital port of Bristol and moving on to begin a Siege of Gloucester on 10 August. The Royalists correctly estimated that Essex's army was too weak to intervene, but Essex and a delegation from both Houses of Parliament appealed to the city, and the Common Council agreed to send a brigade of five regiments under Sgt-Maj-Gen Mainwaring, the individual regiments being chosen by lot:

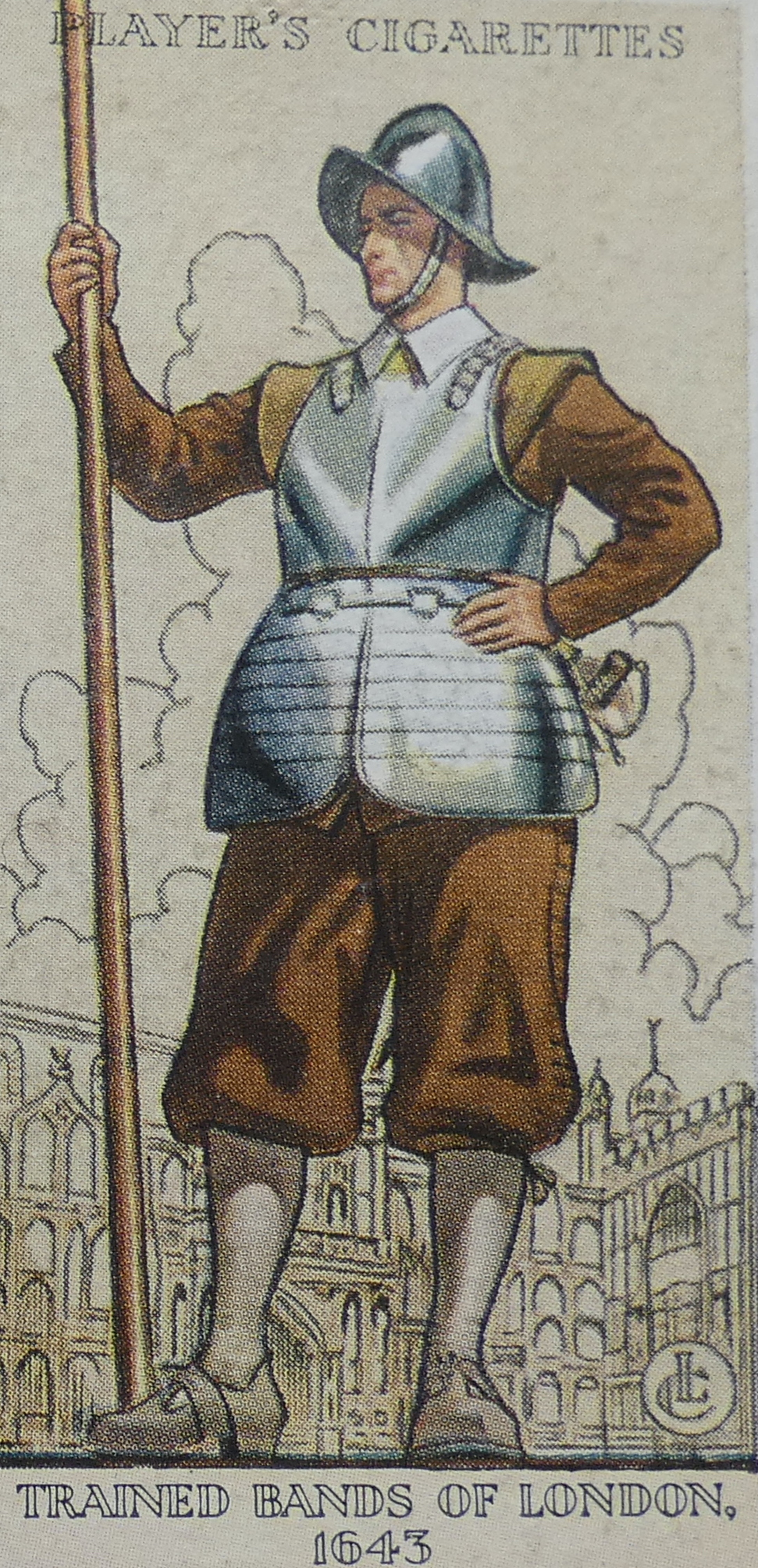
A London Trained Bands pikeman in 1643

- Red Regiment
- Blue Regiment
- Red Auxiliaries
- Blue Auxiliaries
- Orange Auxiliaries

These regiments (roughly 1000 men apiece) were much larger than the equivalent units of Essex's (or the King's) army, which were weakened by casualties, sickness and desertion. The London Militia Committee also released the City Horse, and Mainwaring's Redcoats for the campaign.

The regiments mustered at the New Artillery Ground on 23 August and marched out that night, proceeding via Chalfont and Chesham to rendezvous with Essex's army on Brackley Heath on 1 September. Bolstered by these reinforcements, Essex was strong enough to march through Royalist-held country via Bicester and Chipping Norton, skirting north of the outer defences of Oxford. When the army camped on 3 September there were insufficient quarters and the Red Regiment had to march 1 mile (1.6 km) beyond the rest of the brigade to the village of Oddington near Stow-on-the-Wold to find billets of their own. This put them nearest to the enemy, without a cavalry screen, and shortly after they settled down there was an alarm as Prince Rupert's cavalry was nearby. The Red Regiment stood to arms all night in the open. Next morning the men managed to get some food, but there was a further alarm, and the regiment was drawn up on a nearby hill. It spent some time there, surrounded on three sides by Royalist cavalry squadrons before the rest of the army came up. On 5 September Essex reached Prestbury Hill, overlooking Gloucester. The supply waggons could not attempt the descent until the following morning, and the Red Regiment was again left in the open as baggage guard during a night of rain and alarms. Unused to campaigning, the LTBs complained bitterly about camping out on short rations.

However, the arrival of this army forced the Royalists to break up their siege, and on 8 September Essex entered Gloucester with the badly needed supplies for Col Edward Massey and his garrison. On 10 September most of the army moved to Tewkesbury to cover the Gloucester garrison and citizens' foraging, leaving Mainwaring and two of his regiments in Gloucester. Essex then began building a bridge over the River Severn as if he intended to move against the Royalist stronghold of Worcester. The Royalists moved to cover Worcester, but having successfully feinted and gained a day's march on his opponents, Essex began a rapid march for home. This time he chose to move round the south of the Oxford zone, overrunning a small Royalist garrison and supply train in Cirencester and marching via Cricklade, Swindon and Aldbourne. Rupert caught up at Aldbourne on 18 September and there was a cavalry skirmish involving the City Horse, watched by the LTBs. This delayed Essex's army, which only reached Hungerford that night. Next day the advanced troops of the Royalist Army got ahead of the Parliamentarians and reached Newbury, cutting Essex's route. The Royalists camped on the plateau of Wash Common, just south of the town, while the Parliamentarians halted at Enborne.

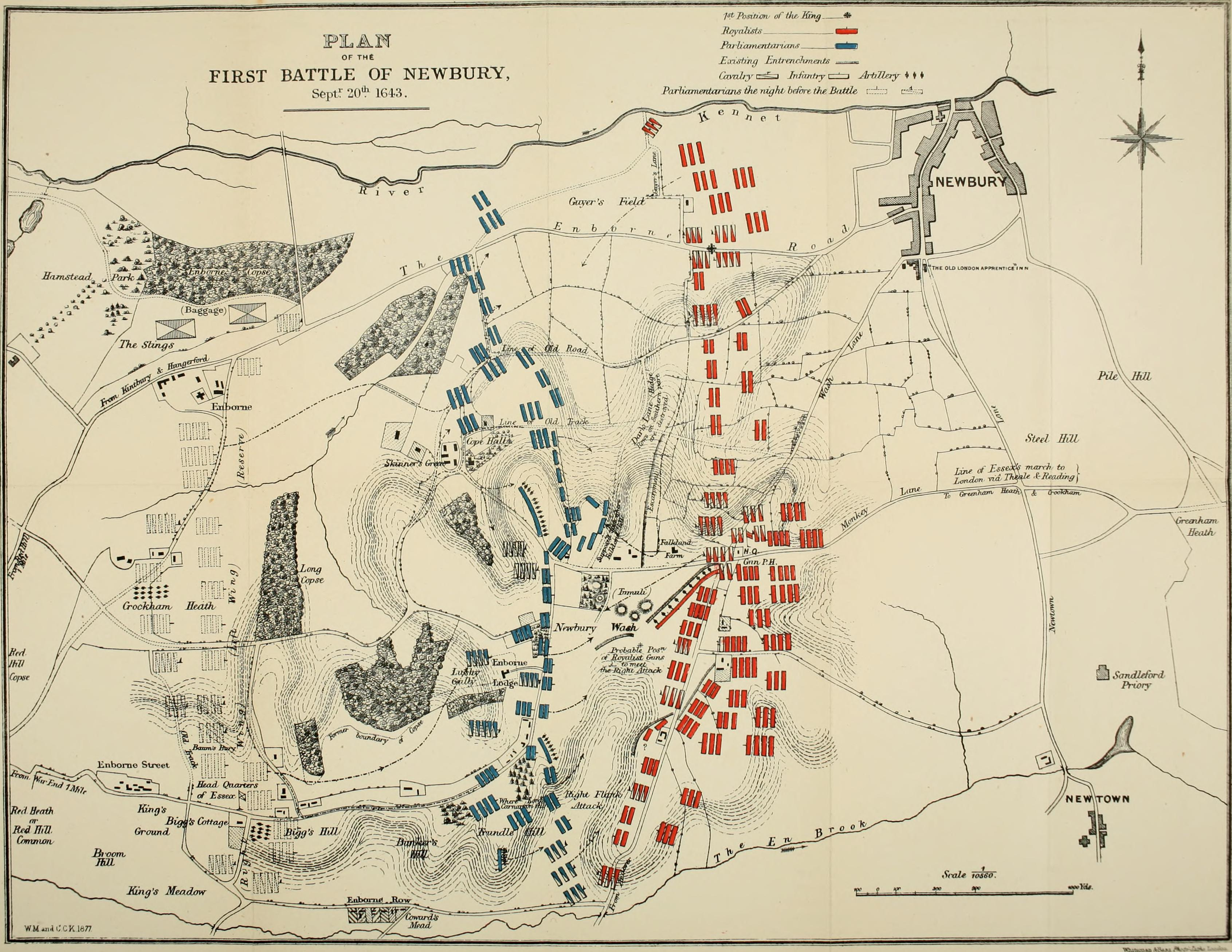
Plan of the First Battle of Newbury.

The Royalists were in a good position, but the Parliamentarians moved before dawn on 20 September, crossed the valley separating the armies, and Skippon's and Lord Robartes' brigades with two light guns were deployed on Round Hill at the edge of the plateau before the Royalists became aware of them. The First Battle of Newbury began about 07.00 with Royalist infantry and cavalry attacks through the fields against Round Hill. These had almost pushed the Parliamentary infantry off the hill when Skippon deployed his reserve, the City Brigade. The Blue Auxiliaries stabilised Robartes' line, which was in a musketry fight in the hedgerows, while the other Auxiliaries drove back the Royalist cavalry with their pikes, encouraged by Essex in person. Skippon then brought up the heavier artillery, whose emplacement was covered by the Red and Blue Regiments drawn up in the open on Wash Common. These two units came under fire from the Royalist guns and renewed attacks by Rupert's cavalry, but despite heavy casualties they held their positions until their own guns were in action. The City Brigade had some 300 wounded, with many killed (60–70 in the Red Regiment alone, including Lt-Col William Tucker commanding the regiment).

The London Train'd-bands and Auxiliary Regiments (of whose inexperience of danger, or any kind of Service beyond the easy practice of their Postures in the Artillery Garden, Men had 'till then too cheap an estimation) behaved themselves to wonder; and were, in truth, the preservation of that Army that day. For they stood as a Bulwark and rampire to defend the rest.

The Royalist historian Clarendon on the LTBs at Newbury

With Essex's line still holding the edge of the plateau, fighting died down for the night about 19.00. The Parliamentarians were prepared to renew the battle next morning, but the Royalists, short of gunpowder, had withdrawn towards Oxford, leaving the London road open. Essex's army marched on towards Reading. It was harried by Rupert's cavalry at Aldermaston, but the LTBs drove them off with musket fire. After resting for three days at Reading, the City Brigade marched home via Maidenhead and Brentford. The men made a ceremonial entry into the City at Temple Bar on 28 September with sprigs of greenery in their hats to signify victory. The Red Regiment resolved to give thanks at St Botolph's Aldgate every year on 20 September.

While one City Brigade was marching back from Newbury, a great muster of the LTBs had been held in Finsbury Fields on 24 September and regiments were chosen by lot for a second brigade to join Sir William Waller's South Eastern Association army. The regiments chosen were the Green Auxiliaries with the Westminster Red Regiment (also known as the Westminster Liberty Regiment) and Tower Hamlets Yellow Auxiliaries, but in view of Essex's successful expedition they did not march out immediately. Once his City Brigade had returned home Essex's army was too weak to hold Reading. A further three TBs regiments were then chosen – the Green and Orange Regiments and the Southwark Yellow Regiment – and all six regiments, together with Mainwaring's Redcoats, were to join Essex and Waller at Windsor to recapture Reading. However, news of a second Royalist army advancing through Hampshire under Lord Hopton forced a change of plan, and Waller and Essex separated, the former to Farnham to face Hopton, the latter to capture Newport Pagnell, each force accompanied by a London brigade.

=== Basing House and Alton ===
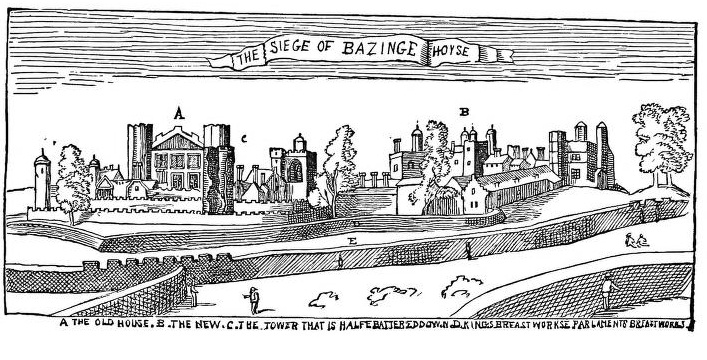
The Siege of Basing House by Wenceslaus Hollar.

The Tower Hamlets Auxiliaries were the first to march out to Brentford, but whole companies were absent and it took some days to bring them out. Many of the trained bandsmen on this expedition were actually paid substitutes, the citizens preferring to stay at home. By 25 October the City Green Auxiliaries and Westminster Red TBs were quartered at Windsor and Datchet, where they were joined by the Tower Hamlets. The brigade was commanded by Sir James Harrington, colonel of the Westminster TBs. It left on 30 October marching via Bagshot and on through the night to Farnham. On 3 November it moved to Alton, Hampshire, where it rendezvoused with Waller's army. The projected move to Winchester was halted by snow and the force returned to the barns and farm buildings it had occupied the previous night. By now numbers of the auxiliaries were deserting and returning home. On 6 November the army moved to attack Basing House, and a 'commanded' body of musketeers skirmished with the defenders until they had used their ammunition and were relieved. Skirmishing continued around the outbuildings next day, but deputations from the London regiments asked Waller to be allowed to withdraw because of the bad weather, while the paid substitutes had run out of money. Waller compromised by allowing them into Basingstoke for rest. He then advanced against Basing House again on 12 November, in two columns, the Londoners being directed against the earthworks facing Basing Park, which they attacked vigorously, employing ladders and Petards. The Westminster TB musketeers got their Volley fire drill mixed up, with numerous front rank men killed and wounded by the second and third ranks firing too soon. With the Royalist artillery concentrating fire on this disordered formation, the Westminster musketeers broke and fled, and the assault failed. The Green Auxiliaries recovered the guns and petards abandoned by the Westminsters. Large numbers of the Westminsters deserted, but were fined or imprisoned when they reached home.

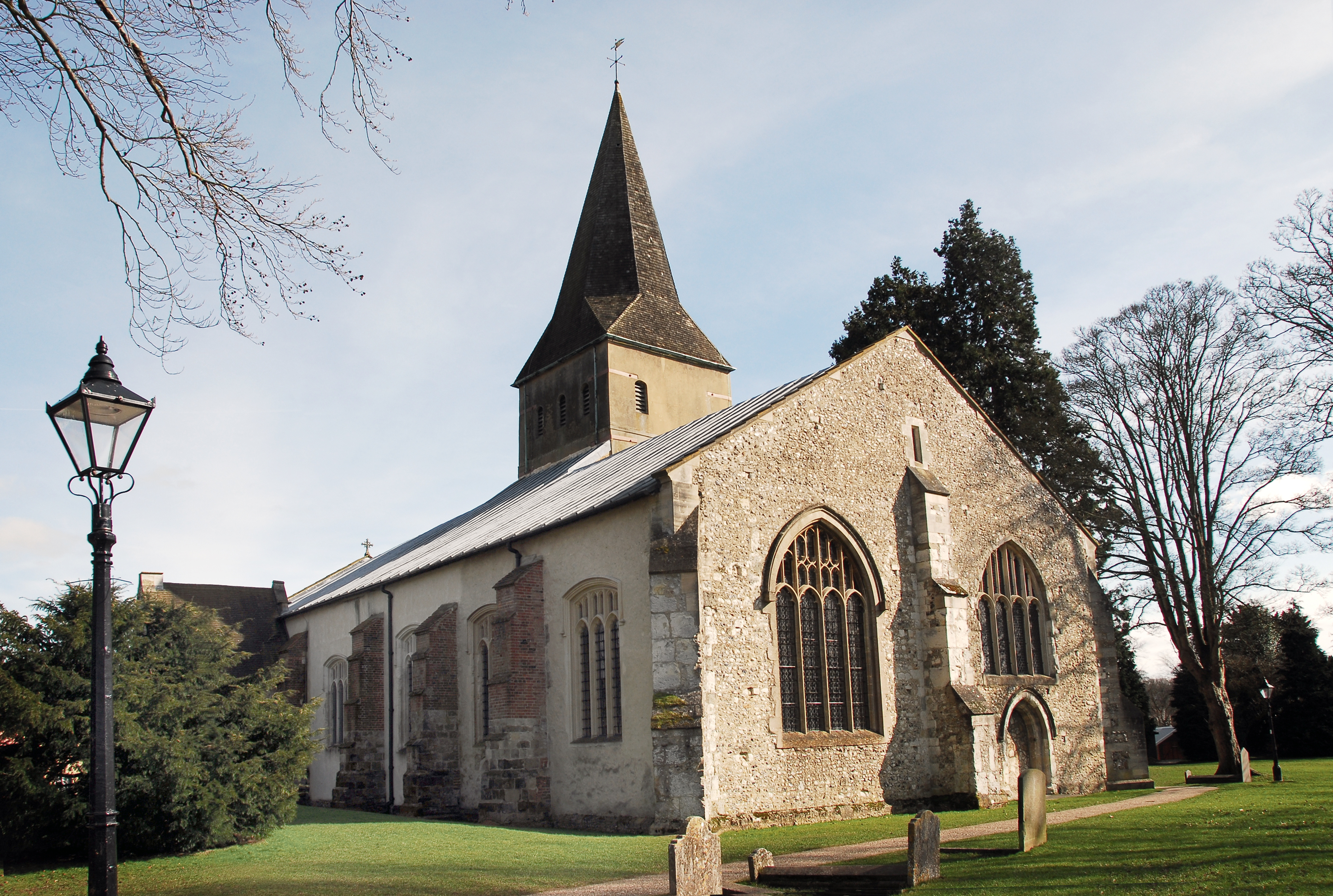
St Lawrence Church, Alton, with the west door (right of picture, now blocked) stormed by the London brigade in 1643.

Next day, Waller was greeted by cries of 'Home, Home!', from the London regiments. Although their officers voted to fight Hopton's approaching army, the trained bandsmen refused (there had been rumours that they were to march to relieve the Siege of Plymouth). Waller abandoned this first Siege of Basing House and retired to Farnham, where food and pay was received. Hopton followed, but after some skirmishing under the guns of Farnham Castle he sent a force to capture Arundel Castle and the rest of his army went into winter quarters. On 12 December Waller mustered his army in Farnham Park and persuaded the London Brigade to stay with him until Christmas. That night he marched out as if to renew the siege of Basing, but instead turned south to Alton, where a brigade of Hopton's army was quartered. The Royalists were taken by surprise as Waller's infantry assaulted the town, the London Brigade supported by the regular garrison of Farnham Castle attacking from the west. The Westminsters and the Farnham Greencoats attacked a breastwork, whose defenders retired when outflanked by the Green Auxiliaries, allowing the brigade to enter the town. The Royalists defended the churchyard wall, but some London musketeers broke in and pushed them back into St Lawrence's Church. The Tower Hamlets forced their way into the church and the Royalists surrendered after their colonel was killed. After the Battle of Alton Waller returned to Farnham and proposed to recapture Arundel Castle, but the London Brigade refused, and Waller allowed them to march home on 20 December. The three regiments held a service of thanksgiving in Christ Church, Newgate Street, on 2 January 1644.

=== Newport Pagnell and Grafton House ===
Meanwhile, the London Brigade with Essex's army had rendezvoused at St Albans on 25 October 1643. Essex sent Skippon with 400 London musketeers and the two regiments of City Horse to seize Newport Pagnell, which a small Royalist force had begun to fortify. On Skippon's approach the Royalists withdrew without a fight on 27 October. The City Horse drove off a number of Royalist probes in November. The Orange and Green Regiments and a regiment of Hertfordshire TBs held the town until a permanent garrison could be recruited from the Eastern Association. Skippon's Dutch engineers designed strong fortifications for Newport Pagnell, with earthworks and ditches. These were dug by the LTBs, even though the London Militia Committee felt that their men could be better employed elsewhere.

Just before Christmas Skippon set out with the Green and Orange Regiments to join the siege of Grafton House. They arrived on 22 December and after two days of skirmishing the artillery had destroyed the mansion's roof. The garrison accepted terms of surrender and the Londoners then entered the house, securing many prisoners and stores before burning the house down. They returned to Newport Pagnell until 11 January 1644, when they marched home, leaving the fortifications in the hands of the new garrison.

=== Battle of Cheriton ===
In December 1643 Parliament appointed Col Richard Browne to command a replacement City brigade for Waller's army. This consisted of the White and Yellow Regiments, the only two City regiments that had not yet seen any service. The White Regiment marched out with a number of cannon to Wandsworth and Clapham on 4 January, were joined by the Yellow Regiment next day, and together they moved out to Kingston upon Thames to secure the bridge. They were then ordered to join Waller's army besieging Arundel. Heavy snow delayed their march for several days at Guildford, and they did not reach Petworth until 29 January, after Arundel had fallen. Here Browne fortified Petworth House in case Hopton's army threatened. The brigade remained there for two months before moving to Midhurst on 20 March and then joining the general muster of Waller's army at East Meon on 27 March. The Royalists planned a surprise attack on Waller's advance guard, but found the whole White Regiment drawn up facing them. Waller came up in support with the main body, and decided to make for Alresford to cut the Royalists off from their base at Winchester. However, the Royalists out-marched him, and his army bivouacked in the fields at Cheriton.

Action on 28 March was confined to cavalry skirmishing. Early next morning Waller sent a 'commanded' party of 1000 musketeers from the White Regiment and one of the regular regiments to secure Cheriton Wood on the Royalists' left flank. Hopton sent a force to drive these skirmishers out, precipitating a general engagement (the Battle of Cheriton). The Royalists did not follow up on Waller's disordered right wing, while the foot fought in the hedgerows on the left of Waller's line. However, the Royalists horse attacked without orders in the centre and a general cavalry battle took place in the space between the wings, the London brigade on the right having to drive back several Royalist cavalry probes in their direction. The Royalist cavalry lost heavily, and in the afternoon Browne led the foot back into Cheriton Wood. Late in the afternoon the Royalists began to give way, pursued by musketry and artillery fire, but made a reasonably orderly retreat to Basing, covered by a rearguard in Alresford.

Waller entered Winchester on 30 March, although the castle remained in Royalist hands, and he began clearing the surrounding countryside. On 6 April Browne's City Brigade was engaged at Bishop's Waltham, where they forced the surrender of the fortified Bishop's Palace. The Londoners were now anxious to return home, and the two regiments left without orders, accompanied by the second regiment of City Horse. They returned as heroes to the city on 14 April. Without the City Brigade Waller had to shut down operations and hold his positions at Bishop's Waltham and Farnham.

=== Oxford and Cropredy Bridge ===
The Parliamentary leaders had ordered a concentration of all their armies in South East England to move against Oxford, but a new London brigade had to be provided before Waller's army could take the field. The London Militia Committee sent the Southwark White Auxiliaries and the Tower Hamlets TBs, later joined by the Westminster Yellow Auxiliaries, all commanded by Maj-Gen Harrington. It sent three of the City auxiliary regiments to join Essex, followed by the other three as a reserve. Accordingly, in mid-May the Green, Yellow and Orange Auxiliaries joined Essex at Reading, which had been abandoned by the Royalists. The two armies rendezvoused at Abingdon-on-Thames, which had also been abandoned by the Royalists, who were calling in their garrisons to form a field army. From 30 May to 1 June the London Auxiliaries were engaged in skirmishes as Essex tried to seize crossings over the River Cherwell at Gosford and Enslow, but on 1 June Waller got across the Thames at Newbridge, and the Royalist guards on the Cherwell were withdrawn. With Oxford partially encircled, the King and the Royalist field army left the city and moved to Evesham, followed by Essex and Waller to Stow-on-the-Wold. At this point the two Parliamentarian armies separated. Essex's army, accompanied by the Auxiliary brigade, marched west to relieve the besieged garrison of Lyme Regis, while Waller with Harrington's Suburban brigade shadowed the King's force.

Waller bombarded Sudeley Castle and forced its surrender on 8 June. There followed three weeks' pursuit of the King round the West Midlands before reaching the area of Banbury on 27 June. Having drawn reinforcements from Oxford the King's army was now prepared to give battle to Waller. The two sides skirmished across the Cherwell on 28 June. Next day the two armies marched parallel to each other on the high ground on either side of the river until Waller saw a gap opening in the Royalist line. To exploit the opportunity he sent his horse across the Cherwell at a ford and the bridge at Cropredy, bringing on the Battle of Cropredy Bridge. The Royalist horse responded aggressively, charging downhill and driving the Parliamentarians back across the river. The Tower Hamlets TBs stoutly defended the west side of the bridge, preventing the Royalists from crossing to complete the destruction of Waller's army. There was only skirmishing next day, but hearing that Browne was marching to join Waller with the Reserve Auxiliary brigade, the King took the opportunity to break contact with Waller's battered force.

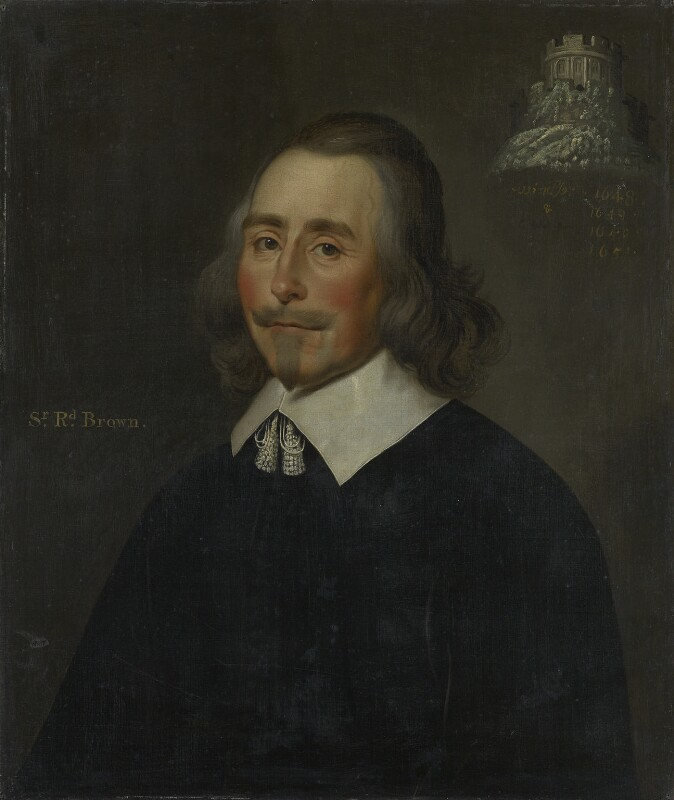
Maj-Gen Richard Browne, afterwards Lord Mayor and Baronet (National Portrait Gallery, London).

Browne's brigade (the Red, White and Blue Auxiliaries) had only left London towards the end of June, following a training day in Hyde Park. The regiments were weak because the city was having trouble finding enough volunteers among the citizens and paid substitutes. Browne had been commissioned as Major-General of Oxfordshire, Buckinghamshire and Berkshire and given the task of reducing the Royalist garrisons. However, when news of the King's move eastwards was received, Browne was directed towards Hertford to protect the Eastern Association counties. He marched with his first two regiments via Barnet, where the Blue Auxiliaries caught up on 26 June, and he reached Leighton Buzzard on 1 July, where he was joined by the Hertfordshire and Essex TBs. Browne was too late to intervene at Cropredy Bridge, and when he joined Waller near Towcester on 2 July the King was already 30 miles (48 km) away. By now Waller's original London brigade (Harrington's suburban regiments) had taken up the chant of 'Home, Home!', and when the colonel and a senior captain of the Southwark White Auxiliaries died of sickness, that regiment marched home to bury them. The remainder of Harrington's brigade was finally allowed home on 14 August. The Essex and Hertfordshire TBs were also deserting, and on 6 July wounded Browne in the face when he confronted them. He was sent to capture Greenland House on the Thames near Henley, under his original orders, which he did with the assistance of part of Venn's Windsor garrison on 11 July, after which the Essex TBs went home and Browne moved to Reading. He was ordered to join Waller at Abingdon, but objected that he had only 'three broken regiments of London auxiliaries, not above 800 in all' to hold Reading. In the end Waller left for London and Browne was put in command of the whole force at Abingdon, including his own auxiliaries and the 'Windsor Regiment'.

=== Lostwithiel Campaign ===
In the West Country, Essex's army, including the London Auxiliary brigade (Green, Yellow and Orange) raised the siege of Lyme on 15 June. He next marched to Weymouth, which quickly surrendered, and he installed the Yellow Auxiliaries under Col John Owen as its garrison. He then made for Exeter with the rest of the army, hoping to capture Queen Henrietta Maria, but she escaped to France before his arrival. However, the check inflicted on Waller at Cropredy had allowed the King to break contact and march with his Oxford army into the West Country to deal with Essex. Having relieved the siege of Plymouth, Essex moved into Cornwall, and was followed by the Royalists on 1 August. By late August Essex's army was hemmed in between Fowey and Lostwithiel, while the Parliamentary fleet was prevented by Royalist guns from entering Fowey harbour to relieve them. After 13 days of the Battle of Lostwithiel, Essex ordered the Parliamentary horse to cut their way out to Plymouth on the night of 30/31 August, while Essex himself escaped by sea, leaving the foot to surrender on 2 September. The surrender was signed by Skippon on behalf of Essex's regular infantry, and Col Christopher Whichcot of the Green Auxiliaries on behalf of the Londoners. The terms were generous: because the Royalists could neither feed nor guard such a large number of prisoners, they were escorted to Poole, and then allowed to march away to Southampton. The disarmed survivors were badly plundered by the country folk on their march. The Green and Orange Auxiliaries returned to London on 24 September, to a low-key welcome. The Yellow Auxiliaries garrisoning Weymouth had been ordered to march west to help Essex, but were too late. They had returned to Weymouth on 14 September, and were then shipped to join the garrison of Plymouth, where the Royalists renewed the blockade.

=== Second Newbury campaign ===
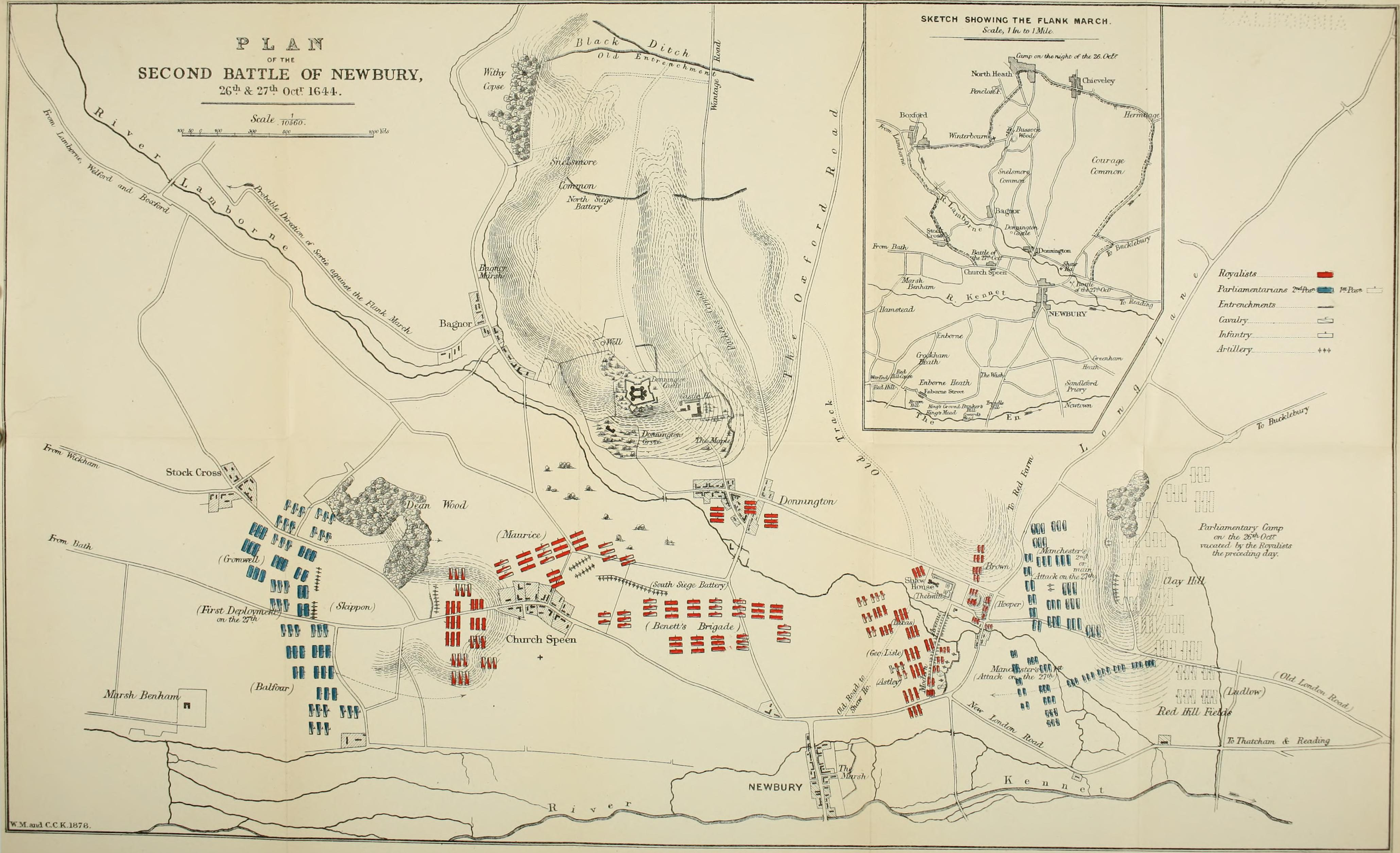
Plan of the Second Battle of Newbury.

The Parliamentary leaders ordered a new concentration of forces to face the King's victorious army on its return from the west, with the Earl of Manchester's Eastern Association army joining the remnants of Essex's and Waller's at Newbury. London provided a fresh brigade under Harrington:

- Red Regiment LTBs
- Blue Regiment LTBs
- Southwark Red TBs
- Westminster Red TBs
- Tower Hamlets Yellow Auxiliaries

Difficulties in raising money led to the London brigade being late in mobilising, but Harrington marched out with the Red Regiment and his own Westminster Regiment on 7 October, followed by the Blue Regiment on 9 October; the remainder waited for their money. The brigade concentrated at Maidenhead on 17 October, though many of the men were still absent. On 19 October Harrington was ordered to march with four regiments to rendezvous with the army at Basingstoke, leaving the Southwark regiment to garrison Reading. On 26 October the combined Parliamentary forces confronted the Royalist army at the Second Battle of Newbury. Essex and Waller worked round to attack from the west towards Speen village while Manchester's army remained to the east, using about 1000 skirmishers to distract attention from the pincer movement. The skirmishers were driven back, and in the afternoon Manchester attacked Shaw House when he heard cannon fire from the west. Despite Royalist reports that the London brigade was with Manchester, suffering heavy casualties in his skirmish line and final attack, they were in fact with Essex's army, which had made a 13 miles (21 km) march to get into position. Essex being sick, the army was deployed by Skippon, who reported that 'The two Red and [one] Yellow Regiments of the Citizens held the Enemy play on the right', while the Blue Regiment came up from reserve to assist the other brigades. Harrington had his horse shot under him during the battle, and some of the cannon lost at Lostwithiel were recaptured. Nevertheless, the Parliamentarian combination misfired and the Royalists escaped the trap to reach Oxford.

The Red and Blue Regiments and the Tower Hamlets Auxiliaries stayed on to besiege Donnington Castle, and exchanged fire when the Royal army returned in force on 9 November to retrieve the guns lodged in the castle after the battle. The Southwark TBs had been sent to take part in a new siege of Basing House, where they were joined on 15 November by the Tower Hamlets from Donnington but the siege of Basing was lifted for the winter, and by 25 November the London brigade was fortifying Henley. Harrington considered the place untenable and his men overstretched, particularly when the Tower Hamlets were sent to reinforce Browne at Abingdon. On 6 December Harrison was permitted to withdraw, and the three regiments with him arrived back in London on 14 December. Browne kept up active forays from Abingdon against Oxford, but his garrison was being depleted by sickness and desertion, and in December the three weak regiments of City Auxiliaries (Red, White and Blue) were reduced into a single regiment under Col George Paine.

=== Reorganisation ===
The second Newbury campaign was the LTBs' last active service of the war. In 1645 Parliament finally organised a properly paid, equipped, and trained field army for service anywhere in the kingdom: the New Model Army. Most of the regional armies were absorbed into the New Model, the foot regiments of which were trained and commanded by Skippon. This powerful force no longer needed to be periodically reinforced by field brigades of the LTBs. In June 1645 the London Militia Committee raised a full-time regiment (the 'New Model of the Forts') to relieve the citizens of the LTBs from the burden of garrisoning the Lines of Communication round London. The LTBs continued to man the 'Courts of Guard' (night patrol posts) around the city, and continued their musters and training. The Auxiliaries from Abingdon finally returned to London on 20 December 1645, having garrisoned the town for 15 months. The Yellow Auxiliaries cut off in Plymouth may not have returned to London until the town was fully relieved in January 1646.

The London Auxiliaries were recruited back to strength for a general muster on 19 May 1646, when all 18 regiments were on parade in Hyde Park but the First English Civil War had effectively ended with the surrender of King Charles to the Scots in April. The LTBs were paraded again for the funeral of the Earl of Essex in October. By 1647 control of the English Trained Bands had become an issue between Parliament and the Army, as it had been between Parliament and the King. The Army regarded the TBs as its second line and tried to wrest control from the politicians, some of whom wanted to use the LTBs as a counterweight to the Army, which refused to disband until pay arrears were settled. The City purged the LTB officers of 'Independents' and other radical sects, which were gaining control of the Army. However, when the Army marched on London in June 1647 hardly any of the trained bandsmen attended the muster that was called. Skippon having refused the sergeant-major-generalship of the city, Maj-Gen Massey, assisted by Waller, was appointed to raise a force from disbanded soldiers but when the army reached Hounslow and the LTBs refused to muster, the Common Council caved in, and the New Model marched in. The revived London Militia Committee restored the purged officers, demolished the Lines of Communication and returned the suburban trained bands to local control. Although a riot by pro-Royalist apprentices was put down by the regulars, companies of LTBs patrolled the streets under Skippon's command once more.

In 1648, during the brief Second English Civil War there was a Royalist rising in Kent under the Earl of Norwich. Evading the New Model forces, he marched on London, expecting the Royalists there to join him. However, Skippon called out the LTBs and this time they mustered in force and manned the gates. Norwich's force diverted into East Anglia where it was destroyed at the Siege of Colchester.

At the end of 1648 the army rejected Parliament's proposed treaty with the King, and replaced the LTB guards on the Houses Parliament with Col Thomas Pride's New Model regiment. Pride's men then denied entry to those MPs who opposed them ('Pride's Purge") and the army arrested moderate officers, including Browne, Massey and Waller. The 'Rump Parliament' then passed a new Militia Act in 1650, replacing lords lieutenant with county commissioners appointed by Parliament or the Council of State.

=== Commonwealth and Protectorate ===
When Charles II and the Scots invaded in 1650, (the Third English Civil War) the 12 regiments of LTBs and Auxiliaries mustered to witness the hangman ceremonially burning Charles's manifesto. During the campaign that culminated at the Battle of Worcester, the regiments were on full alert to guard London. In addition, ‘London Volunteer Regiments’ were raised, comprising 1000 musketeers with matchlocks, 500 with 'snaphances' (early flintlocks) and 500 pikemen under the command of Maj-Gen Thomas Harrison. Like the former 'New Model of the Forts' these were garrison troops to allow the regulars of the New Model to march out, and were disbanded as soon as the emergency was over.

Under the Commonwealth and Protectorate the militia received pay when called out, and operated alongside the New Model Army to control the country. When insurrection threatened in 1655 Lord Protector Cromwell appointed new commissioners including Skippon to control the LTBs in case they were needed to suppress civil disorder. They were not to be employed outside the city without their own consent. Five thousand men were reviewed by Cromwell's sons, but in the event the rebellion was crushed and the militia was not required. When Cromwell raised troops of horse militia to police the country under his regional major-generals, none were stationed in London When Cromwell died in 1658 the LTBs formed part of the funeral procession.

== Post-Restoration ==
After the crisis following Cromwell's death London welcomed the return of Charles II and the Restoration of the Monarchy in 1660. Skippon was dismissed and Gen George Monck was appointed to command the City troops. When Charles arrived on 29 May he was met at St George's Fields by a great procession from the city, led by Maj Gen Richard Browne, with the LTBs and Auxiliaries lining the route. Browne, who like Monck had been instrumental in organising the restoration, was created a Baronet and elected Lord Mayor later that year.

=== Venner’s Rising ===
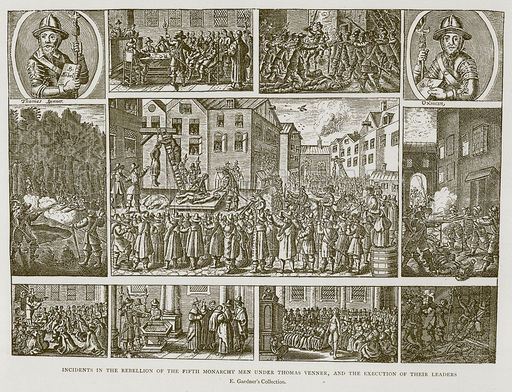
'Incidents in the Rebellion of the Fifth Monarchy Men under Thomas Venner, and the Execution of their Leaders' (contemporary print).

The Fifth Monarchists were a radical Protestant sect that was well-represented in the New Model Army, but later turned against the regime of Cromwell and his son. Their leader, Maj-Gen Thomas Harrison, was executed as a regicide after the Restoration, and his place was taken by Thomas Venner. Venner continued to plot with disbanded army veterans against the restored monarchy. Venner's Rising began on Sunday 1 January 1661 when a number of Fifth Monarchy men attempted to seize St Paul's Cathedral in the name of ‘King Jesus’, killing a passer-by. They drove off four files of musketeers (about 24 men) who were sent from the Main Guard of the LTBs at the Royal Exchange to dislodge them, but then were attacked by the Lord Mayor, Maj-Gen Sir Richard Browne, leading the Yellow Regiment of LTBs. Venner's men retreated to Ken Wood on Hampstead Heath where they regrouped. On 4 January the insurgents re-entered the City and the Guards were sent from Whitehall to deal with them, as well as the City regiments. There was fierce fighting in Threadneedle Street and Wood Street, where the insurgents were pursued by the Yellow Regiment. Eventually they were cornered in the Blue Anchor in Coleman Street and the Helmet Tavern in Threadneedle Street, where the Yellow Regiment broke in through the roofs and stormed up the stairs, killing or capturing them all. Venner and his leading associates were hanged in Coleman Street on 19 January 1661.

=== Militia reformed ===
The English Militia was re-established by The King's Sole Right over the Militia Act 1661 under the control of the king's lords-lieutenant, the men to be selected by parish ballot. This was popularly seen as the 'Constitutional Force' to counterbalance a 'Standing Army' tainted by association with the New Model Army that had supported Cromwell's military dictatorship. The city was covered by its own City of London Militia Act 1662, which continued the LTBs under the control of the Lord Mayor and Aldermen as Commissioners for the Lieutenancy of the City of London. The term ‘Trained Bands’ went out of use in most counties after 1661: London was one of the exceptions, and it remained the official title of the London Militia until 1794, when they were reorganised under their own Act of Parliament.

The LTBs were called out to suppress riots by London weavers in 1675 and 1689, but did not behave well in the first instance (several trained bandsmen were themselves arrested for encouraging the rioters and the Regulars had to be called in). During the time of the Popish Plot and the Exclusion Crisis trained bandsmen patrolled the streets of the city by day and night from October 1678 to December 1681. Royalist officials used the LTBs to intimidate opposition candidates and electors in the 1682 City elections.

The LTBs were not employed during the Glorious Revolution of 1688, when London transferred its loyalty to William and Mary, or during the subsequent wars. When the Militia were mustered in 1697, the City regiments (referred to both as Militia and as Trained Bands) and their colonels were:

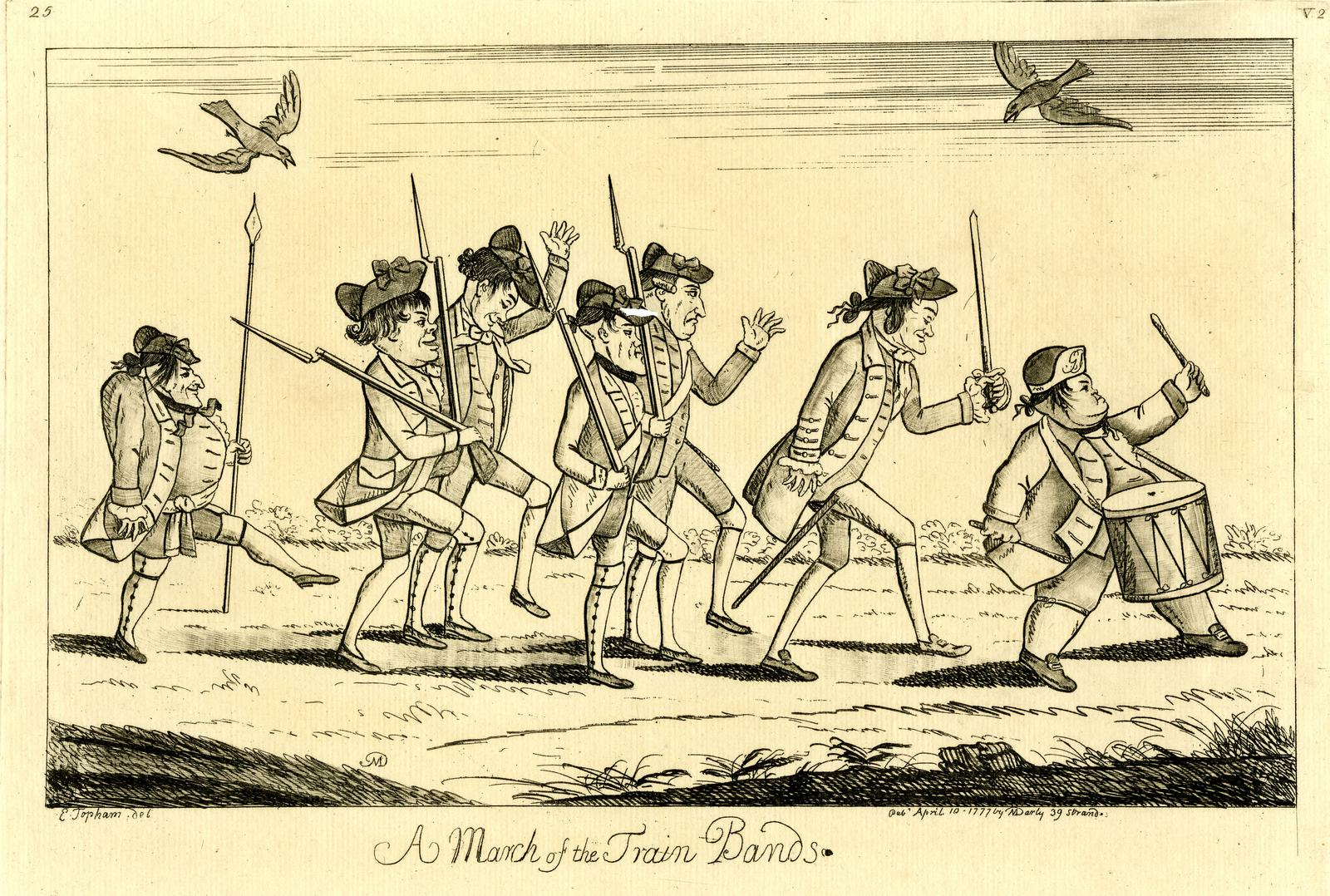
1777 caricature of the London Trained Bands

- Orange Regiment, Col Sir Robert Clayton (Lord Mayor 1679)
- White Regiment, Col Sir William Ashhurst (Lord Mayor 1693)
- Green Regiment, Col Sir William Hedges (Governor of the East Indies Company)
- Yellow Regiment, Col Sir Thomas Stampe (Lord Mayor 1691)
- Red Regiment, Col Sir Thomas Lane (Lord Mayor 1694)
- Blue Regiment, Col Sir Owen Buckingham (Lord Mayor 1704)

Each regiment consisted of 8 companies, a total 6770 men.

Generally the militia declined after the Peace of Utrecht in 1713, effectively disappearing in some counties, but not London where the six traditional LTB regiments continued in existence, and together with the HAC continued to play a role in civic ceremonies and . In 1719 it was made compulsory for officers and sergeants of the LTBs to be members of the HAC. During the Jacobite rising of 1745 the LTBs were employed to guard the approaches to London.

=== Gordon Riots ===
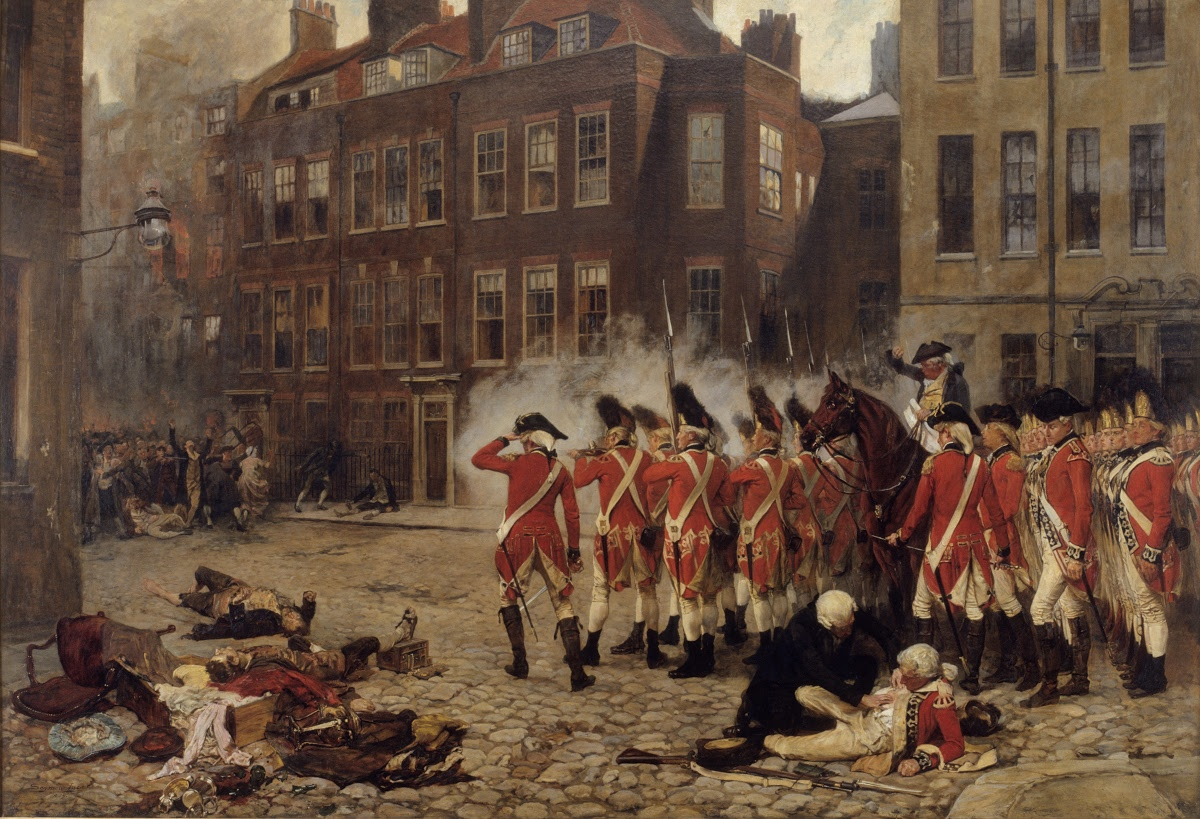
Troops firing on the Gordon Rioters, from the 1879 painting The Gordon Riots by John Seymour Lucas.

The LTBs were deployed on the streets of London during the Gordon Riots of 1780. The Bank of England was a likely target for the rioters, and a force of regular troops was sent to defend it alongside the militia and volunteers. Radical journalist and former Lord Mayor John Wilkes, who was Chamberlain of London, commanded a picquet in the Bank's defences (though it is unclear whether he was with the militiamen or volunteers). On the evening of 7 June the Bank was attacked and the militia under Col Holroyd fired six or seven volleys, killing several rioters and driving them back. Following the riots a permanent Bank Picquet was stationed every night until 1973, usually provided by the Brigade of Guards, but by the LTBs or HAC during elections (when it was illegal for the army to be stationed in the city).

== Successor units ==
The London Trained Bands, with their own act of Parliament, remained outside many of the 18th Century reforms of the militia system until they were finally reorganised under the Militia Act 1794. The traditional six regiments were reduced to two, the East London Militia and the West London Militia under the Commissioners of Lieutenancy for the city. Unlike most county militia regiments which could be 'embodied' for permanent service anywhere in the country, one of the London regiments had to remain in the city at all times and the other could not legally be employed more than 12 miles (19 km) away. Both regiments were awarded the prefix 'Royal' in 1804. They were amalgamated as the Royal London Militia, under its own act of Parliament, the Militia (City of London) Act 1820.

Under the Cardwell Reforms the militia were associated with their local county regiments, and in 1881 they formally became battalions of in those regiments. The Royal London Militia became the 4th Battalion, Royal Fusiliers (City of London Regiment). Under the Haldane Reforms of 1908 the militia were converted into the Special Reserve (SR), the London unit becoming the 7th (Extra Reserve) Bn, Royal Fusiliers. This was one of just a handful of SR battalions that saw combat in World War I. After the war the SR fell into abeyance and the militia was formally disbanded in 1953.

== Uniforms and insignia ==
In St Helen's, Bishopsgate, in the City of London is a carved wooden memorial to Martin Bond, (died aged 83 in 1643) who is described as 'Captaine' of the London Trained Bands at Tilbury in 1588, and later 'Chief Captain' until his death. He is depicted seated in his tent, wearing armour, his groom waiting outside with his horse. Flanking the entrance to the tent are two sentries, dressed as musketeers of 1643, in broad-brimmed hats and wearing bandoliers.

Although there has been a presumption that the trained bandsmen were dressed in coloured coats corresponding to their regimental names (as in the regular forces), there is no evidence of this, rather that they wore their ordinary clothes. The pikemen might purchase a buff coat for protection, but otherwise there was no uniformity. The colours in the regimental names related to the large ensigns carried by each company.

== Traditions ==
The 7th (City of London) Battalion, London Regiment, claimed descent from the Yellow Regiment of LTBs (among others), but there was no link, the true descendants of the LTBs being the 7th Bn Royal Fusiliers (City of London Regiment). As its slow march the 7th Londons adopted the tune My Lady Greensleeves, allegedly credited to the LTBs in the Stationers' Company register for 1580, and referred to as a marching tune in William Shakespeare's The Merry Wives of Windsor.

== Re-enactors ==
- Trayn'd Bands of London (US)
- Blew Regiment, LTB (The Sealed Knot)
- First Captayne's Companie, The Blewe Regiment of ye Trayned Bandes of ye Cittie of London (English Civil War Society of America)

== See also ==
- Trained bands
- Militia (England)
- Militia (Great Britain)
- London Militia
- Royal London Militia
- Southwark Trained Bands
