= Sir James Harington, 3rd Baronet =

English politician and military officer

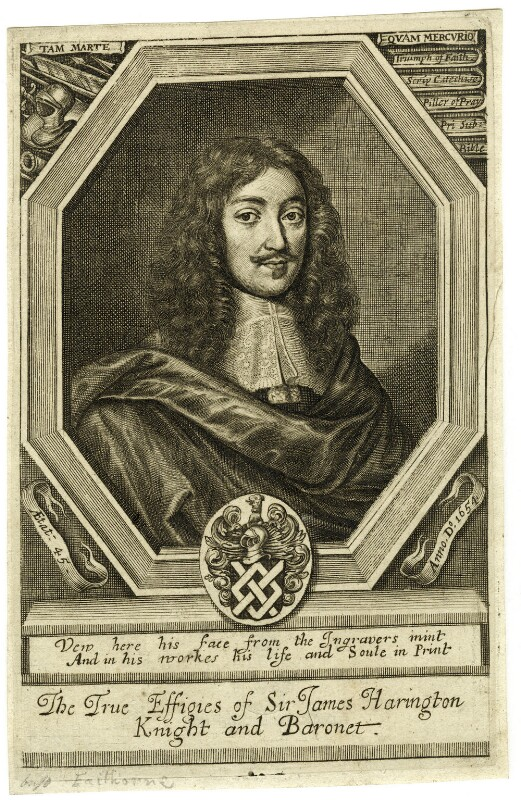
An engraving of Harington

Colonel Sir James Harington, 3rd Baronet (30 December 1607 – c. 1680) was an English politician and military officer who fought on the Parliamentarian side during the Wars of the Three Kingdoms.

== Early life ==
James Harington was the eldest son of Edward Harington of Ridlington and Margaret Doyley. He married Katherine Wright (1617-1675), a daughter of Sir Edmund Wright, Lord Mayor of London, and inherited Swakeleys House from Wright.

== Military career ==
Harrington was Colonel of the Westminster Trained Bands (the Red Regiment) in 1642, and he commanded a London brigade (his own regiment, together with the Green Auxiliary Trained Bands of London and the Tower Hamlets Auxiliaries (the Yellow Regiment)) in Sir William Waller's Parliamentarian army at the Siege of Basing House and Battle of Alton in late 1643. As a Major-General, Harrington led out another brigade of suburban Trained Bands (the Tower Hamlets Regiment, the Southwark White Auxiliaries and the Westminster Yellow Auxiliaries) to join Waller in the campaign that culminated at the Battle of Cropredy Bridge on 29 June 1644. For the great combination of Parliamentary armies in the autumn of 1644, London provided a fresh brigade of five regiments under Harrington. It fought at the Second Battle of Newbury, where Harrington had his horse shot under him.

== Political career ==
He was elected MP for Rutland (1646–1653) and Middlesex (1654–55). Although he did not sign the death warrant, Harrington was one of the Commissioners (Judges) at the trial of Charles I. During the Interregnum, he continued to serve the Parliamentary cause, He served on the first Council of State and later was for a time president of the council. After the Restoration he was excepted from the Indemnity and Oblivion Act which pardoned most for taking up arms against the King in the Civil War, and died in exile on the European mainland. His baronetcy, which he had inherited on his father's death in 1653, was declared forfeited for life in 1661.

== See also ==
- Portrait of Katherine Wright, Lady Harington, engraved by William Faithorne, Fitzwilliam Museum
- Baronet Ridlington
- James Harrington, the author of Oceana, a cousin often confused with this man.

== Notes ==
Baronetage of England
Preceded by Edward Harington	Baronet (of Ridlington); 1653–1661	Succeeded by Edmund Harington
