= Philip Skippon =

English army officer and politician (c. 1600-1660)

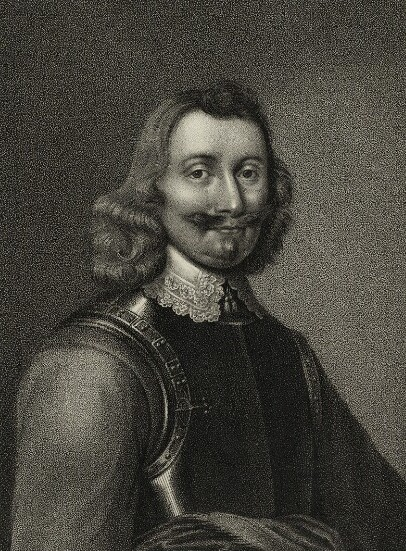
Portrait of Skippon

Major-General Philip Skippon (c. 1600 – 20 February 1660) was an English army officer and politician. He fought for the Parliamentary cause during the English Civil War as a senior officer in the New Model Army. Prior to the war, Skippon fought in the religious wars on the continent. During the Interregnum he was a member of Parliament, an active soldier and on occasions a government administrator.

== Life ==
=== Background ===
Philip Skippon was the son of Luke Skippon (c. 1567–1638), the son of Bartholomew Skippon of Weasenham St Peter, Norfolk. Luke and his elder brother William (born c. 1566) went to school at Dereham and studied at Gonville and Caius College, Cambridge. William lived at Tawstock in north Devon where he was Secretary to Lord Bath, and died there on 1 January 1633/34. Luke (born c. 1567) had his seat at West Lexham, Norfolk, and was father of two notable sons, Philip, and Luke (died 1676), who entered Peterhouse, Cambridge in 1614 and made his career there, becoming junior Proctor in 1633–34, and being nominated for Mastership of the college in 1663 but not appointed.

=== To 1638 ===
Philip entered the military profession at an early age and in July 1620 volunteered to join Sir Horace Vere's expedition to aid Frederick V of Bohemia in the Electorate of the Palatinate. He served in it until the Bohemian defeat in 1623, participating in the two sieges of Frankenthal (where he was married in 1622). He then went on to serve Maurice of Nassau in the Netherlands, receiving a commission in 1625. At the sieges of Breda in 1625 and 1637 he was wounded, and under his old commander, Lord Vere, he was present when 's-Hertogenbosch and Maastricht were attacked in 1629. By 1632 he was a sergeant major and led many of the sorties at Maastricht with distinction. He also became deeply interested in religion, writing small private religious volumes for his family.

=== 1639–1644 ===
A veteran of 18 years' experience, Captain Skippon returned to England in 1638. On 23 October 1639 he was recommended by Charles I of England for a command in the Honourable Artillery Company and he moved to London to take up this command. With civil war looming, on 10 January 1642 he was made major-general and commander of the City of London's Trained Bands by Parliament in defiance of the king's authority, and two days later he mustered them to welcome the five members who Charles had failed to arrest. On 13 May Charles ordered Skippon to join him at York, but Skippon replied "I desire to honour God and not to honour men", and Parliament declared Charles's order illegal. Skippon was absent at the Parliamentarian defeats at Edgehill and Brentford, but continued to train his men before marching them out of London to strengthen the forces of the Earl of Essex, Captain-General of the Parliament's forces. He then faced Royalist forces at the Battle of Turnham Green, encouraging his under-trained militiamen with the words:

Come my boys, my brave boys, let us pray heartily and fight heartily. I will run the same hazards and fortunes with you. Remember the cause is for God, and for the defence of yourselves, your wives, your children. Come, my honest brave boys, pray heartily and fight heartily, and God will bless us

Within a week of the battle Essex made Skippon his Sergeant-Major-General, a post which carried with it the command of the foot and the complicated duty of arranging the line of battle. In 1643 his religious tracts written in the Netherlands were collected and published as The Christian Centurion, one of many devotional tracts he published for his troops to read. However, his high level of experience meant that Parliament was unwilling to risk him in action early in the war, though he did serve alongside Essex at Gloucester. His first field command came on 20 September 1643, with command of the left wing and reserves at the First Battle of Newbury. He continued serving with Essex during the disastrous Lostwithiel campaign and was left in command of the Parliamentarian garrison of 6,000 there on 1 September 1644 when Essex and Lord Robartes fled to Plymouth. The following day, without hope of reinforcement, Skippon negotiated with King Charles: having gained very reasonable terms for his forces, he surrendered and marched his force out of the town. He then gathered the infantrymen from that force in October and marched them to take part in the second Battle of Newbury, occupying the centre of the high ground near Stockcross and recapturing seven of the guns they had lost at Lostwithiel.

=== 1645 ===
The appointment as Sergeant-Major-General of the New Model Army soon followed, as, apart from his distinguished services, there was scarcely another man in England with the knowledge of detail requisite for the post. In this capacity he supported Thomas Fairfax as loyally as he had supported Essex. He led the centre at the Battle of Naseby, where he refused to leave the field while victory was still in the balance despite being dangerously wounded. For his conduct on this decisive occasion, the two Houses of Parliament thanked him, and they sent him special physicians to cure him of his wound. It was a long time before he was fit to serve in the field again. He only reappeared at the siege of Oxford, which he directed. At the end of the war he was selected for the command of the forthcoming Irish expedition, with the rank of marshal-general. The discontent of the soldiery, however, which ended in open mutiny, put an end to a command which Skippon had only accepted under great pressure. He bore a part in all the movements which the army leaders now carried out.

=== Post-war ===
Skippon endeavoured to preserve a middle position between his own Presbyterianism and the Independents, and to secure a firm treaty with the king by any means. The army outstripped Fairfax and Skippon in action. The major-general was named as one of the king's judges, but, like Fairfax, did not take his place. After the war he was returned as MP for King's Lynn in 1654, 1656 and 1658 during the Commonwealth. He also held high military and civil offices. During the Rule of the Major-Generals he was appointed to command the London military district (with John Barkstead as his deputy, who was zealous in suppressing immorality and ungodliness in the area under Skippon's control), where his popularity was always high— but ceased to influence passing events. He said little in Parliament, though his comment on John Naylor ("If this be liberty, God deliver us from such liberty!") is well known. He was one of the members of Cromwell's House of Lords, and, in general, was universally respected and beloved. On Cromwell's death he was made head of the London Militia again by the restored Long Parliament. Age and infirmities prevented him from taking any part in the revolutions which culminated in the Restoration, and in March 1660 he died.

=== Family ===
He had first married Maria Comes of Frankenthal, Lower Palatinate, in the Netherland church there on 14 May 1622, by whom he had several children, most of whom did not survive infancy. These were Anna (Utrecht, 1623–1624), Anna (Montfoort, 1625), William (Amersfoort, 1628-1646/47), Marie (Amersfoort, 1631), Phillip (Amersfoort, 1633-1633), Susanna (West Lexham, 1635), Luke (Foulsham, 1638) and Philip (Hackney, 1641). Their son and surviving heir Philip became MP for Dunwich. The General's wife Maria Skippon died at Acton on 24 January 1655/56, and had a monument in the church there. There was a second marriage, for his widow Dame Katherine Skippon is first-named in his will written at Acton, Middlesex, which leaves lands there, and at Bletchley, Buckinghamshire, and in Norfolk and Suffolk. The will also refers to his son Philip and daughters Anne Bragge, Mary Skippon and Susan Meredith. Susan was the wife of Sir Richard Meredith, 2nd Baronet of Leeds Abbey, Kent.
