= Sergeant major general =

Military rank

Sergeant major general is an archaic early modern and now mostly-unused military rank. The lieutenant general was essentially the captain general's right-hand man, the deputy commander of the entire army. Below him was another rank called the sergeant major general. This officer was responsible for handling the daily organization of the army, its formations and drilling the troops. The sergeant major general was not a deputy commander but rather the chief administrator of the army structure. A prominent example was Philip Skippon in the English New Model Army as organized by Oliver Cromwell.

Over the course of the 17th century, the increasing education and professionalisation of armies saw sergeant major general become the most junior of the general ranks. At the same time, the sergeant portion of the title was more and more commonly dropped; by the early 18th century, the rank's name had been permanently shortened to major general.

== Rank confusion ==
When the captain general rank eventually faded away in many armies, the lieutenant general remained as the highest general officer rank and the Sergeant major general kept its place below, leaving the current odd ordering as a historical artifact. It made perfect sense in the original structure; but once part of that structure disappeared, the titles became misleading. Since sergeant major general had ranked below lieutenant general, the newly named rank of major general appeared to create a precedence issue, in that a major outranks a lieutenant but a lieutenant general outranks a major general. This continues to cause confusion to those unfamiliar with the history of the rank, particularly in those armies using insignia similar to the British Army. The rank is sometimes used by paramilitary organizations such as militias. The military culture of Armies are deeply conservative institutions when it comes to hierarchy and ritual built on centuries of tradition. While changing the title of major generals to something more intuitive (i.e. division generals, for instance) could have avoided the confusion, but militaries tend to resist such changes.
