= Trained band =

Type of English militia force

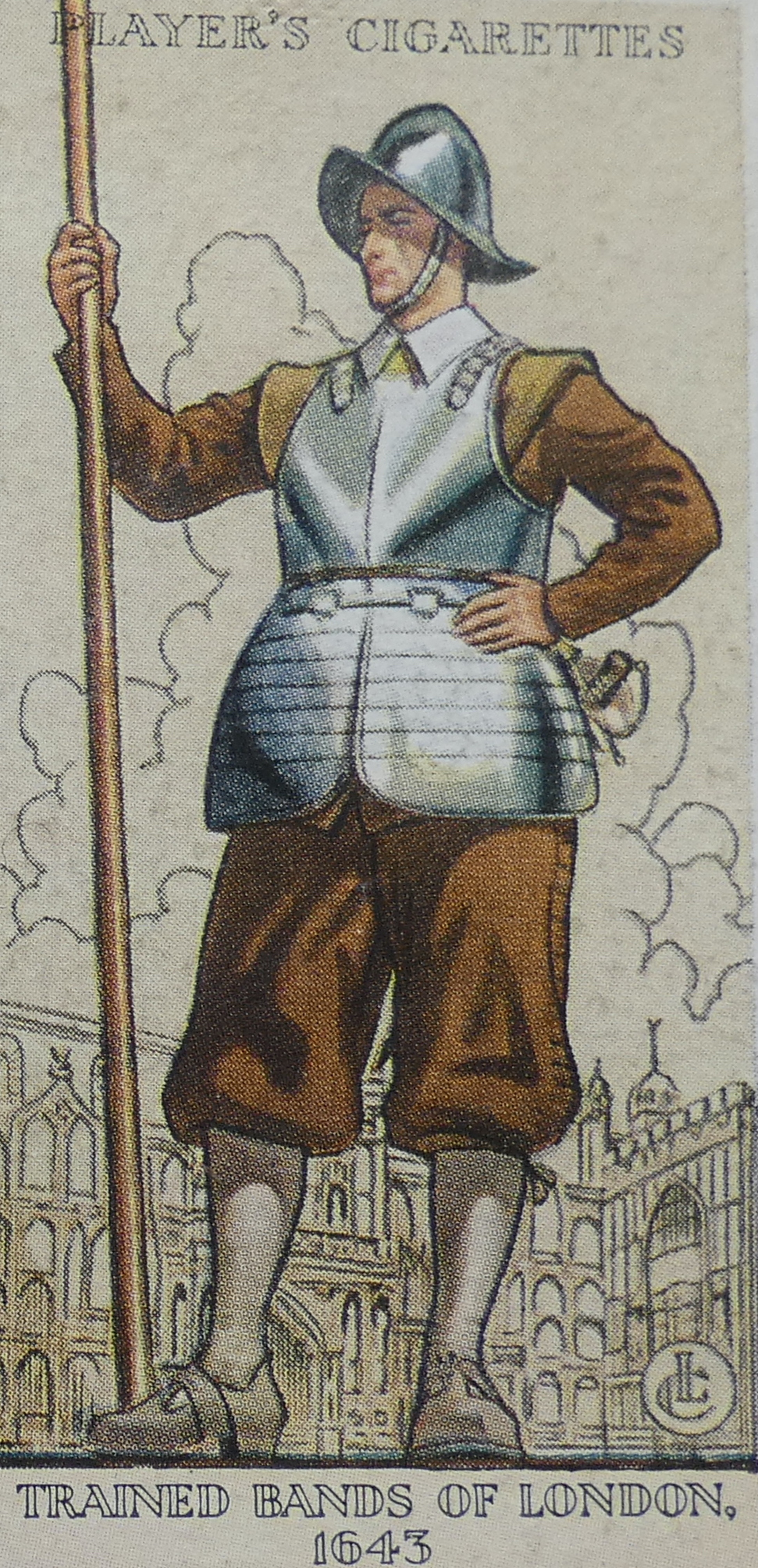
Illustration of a London Trained Bands pikeman in 1643

Trained bands were a type of militia force which existed in Great Britain and British America between the 16th and 18th centuries. Trained bands were first organised in England and Wales in 1572 at the county level, and were supposed to drill on a regular basis although actual training was much less frequent. Trained bands were common in England's American colonies, where they were normally referred to as Trainbands. Units of trained bands were gradually renamed as "militia" over the course of the 17th century, a process which was completed by the 18th century, although the militia of London was still referred to as the "London Trained Bands".

== Etymology ==
The exact derivation and usage is not clear. A nineteenth-century dictionary says, under "Train":

train-band, i.e. train'd band, a band of trained men, Cowper, John Gilpin, st. I, and used by Dryden and Clarendon (Todd)

— Skeat's Etymological Dictionary of the English Language (Oxford 1879)

The issue is whether the men "received training" in the modern sense, or whether they were "in the train" or retinue or were otherwise organized around a military "train" as in horse-drawn artillery.

== Trained Bands in England and Wales ==
Founded in 1572, and organised by county, it was not until the 'Exact Militia Programme' of 1625 that they began to have regular training and weapons drill. Even then, standards varied considerably, and depended on the level of financial support by the local gentry. Although Charles I tried to assemble armies of around 30,000 militia for the 1639 and 1640 Bishops' Wars, there was considerable reluctance to serve outside their counties, and a proportion were armed only with longbows. In 1588, the Trained Bands consisted of 79,798 men, categorized by their primary weapon: 36% arquebusiers, 6% musketeers, 16% bowmen, 26% pikemen, and 16% billmen.

A standard drill book was issued in February 1638, which was used throughout the 1639 to 1653 Wars of the Three Kingdoms, together with a muster roll by county. This shows large variations in size, equipment and training; the largest was Yorkshire, which had 12,000 men, then London, with 8,000, increased in 1642 to 20,000. Counties like Shropshire or Glamorgan had fewer than 500 men.

In the early stages of the 1642 to 1646 First English Civil War, the Trained Bands provided the bulk of the forces used by both Royalists and Parliamentarians, but were often unwilling to serve outside their home areas. They were rapidly replaced by more professional bodies, the most important being the New Model Army.

== American train bands ==
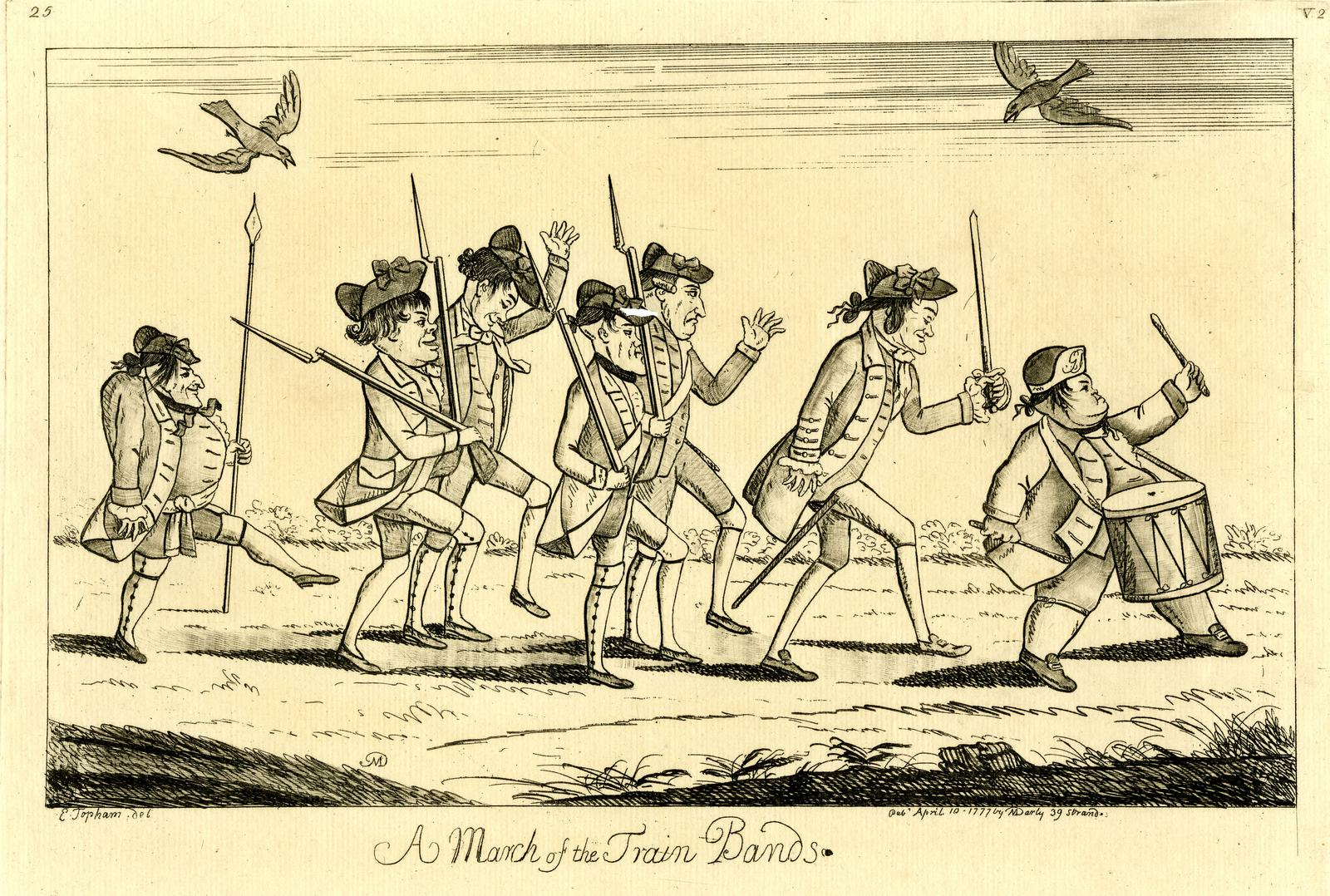
1777 caricature of the London Trained Bands

In the early American colonies the trained band was the most basic tactical unit. However, no standard company size existed and variations were wide. As population grew these companies were organised into regiments to allow better management. But trainbands were not combat units. Generally, upon reaching a certain age a man was required to join the local trainband in which he received periodic training for the next couple of decades. In wartime, military forces were formed by selecting men from trainbands on an individual basis and then forming them into a fighting unit.

In the 17th century New England colonial militia units were usually referred to as "train bands" or, sometimes, "trained bands". Typically, each town would elect three officers to lead its train band with the ranks of captain, lieutenant and ensign. As the populations of towns varied widely, larger towns usually had more than one train band. In the middle of the 1600s train bands began to be referred to as companies.

== Sources ==
- Braddick, Michael (2000). State Formation in Early Modern England, C.1550-1700. Cambridge University Press. ISBN 978-0521783460.
- Mark Charles Fissell, The Bishops' Wars: Charles I's campaigns against Scotland 1638–1640, Cambridge: Cambridge University Press, 1994, ISBN 0-521-34520-0.
- Harris, Tim (2014). Rebellion: Britain's First Stuart Kings, 1567-1642. OUP. ISBN 978-0199209002.
- Warton, Jonathan (April 1997). "Ludlow's Trained Band: A Study of Militiamen in Early Stuart England". Journal of the Society for Army Historical Research. 91 (365): 86–102. JSTOR 44232985.
