= Battle of Turnham Green =

1642 first English Civil War battle

Coordinates: 51.49°N 0.26°W

- Part of the First English Civil War
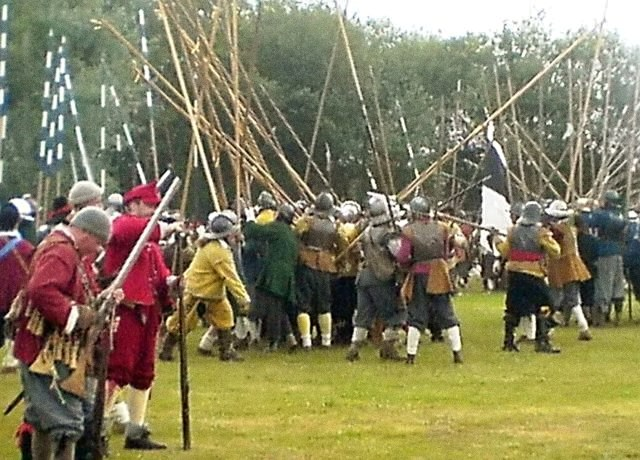
- A modern-day reenactment of the battle
Date	13 November 1642
Location	Turnham Green, Middlesex
Result	Parliamentarian victory

Belligerents
Royalists	Parliamentarians

Commanders and leaders
Charles I Earl of Forth	Earl of Essex; Philip Skippon

Strength
13,000	24,000

Casualties and losses
50 killed	50 killed

The Battle of Turnham Green took place on 13 November 1642 near the village of Turnham Green, at the end of the first campaigning season of the First English Civil War. The battle resulted in a standoff between the forces of King Charles I and the much larger Parliamentarian army under the command of the Earl of Essex. In blocking the Royalist army's way to London immediately, however, the Parliamentarians gained an important strategic victory as the standoff forced Charles and his army to retreat to Oxford for secure winter quarters.

== Prelude ==
After the Battle of Edgehill, King Charles captured Banbury and was greeted by cheering crowds as he arrived in Oxford on 29 October. Charles' nephew and cavalry commander, Prince Rupert of the Rhine, swept down the Thames Valley, capturing Abingdon, Aylesbury and Maidenhead, from where he attempted, unsuccessfully, to capture Windsor from strong Parliamentary forces. After this, many officers wanted to open peace negotiations, contrary to Rupert's desire to carry on to London; the King agreed with the officers, and the Earl of Essex was able to ready the defence of London with the Parliamentarian army.

On 12 November, Rupert, with a large cavalry detachment, stormed Brentford and then proceeded to sack the town. This action encouraged those Londoners who feared for their property to side with the Parliamentarians. On 13 November, Essex's army, with the six regiments of London Trained Bands under Philip Skippon, and other London citizenry, assembled as an army of about 24,000 on Chelsea Field. They advanced to Turnham Green, in the vicinity of the main body of the Royalist army.

== Battle ==
The Royalist army of about 13,000 was commanded by Patrick Ruthven, 1st Earl of Forth, with King Charles also present during the battle. The Parliamentarian army was commanded by Essex and was 24,000 strong, including many poorly trained Londoners. The two armies formed lines running roughly north–south, with the Parliamentary line slightly longer than the Royalist one.

The Royalist army was significantly outnumbered and short of ammunition, so was reluctant to attack. The King was also advised that to engage such an oddly assorted army containing what was obviously a large contingent of armed civilians (namely the trained bands under Philip Skippon), would not endear him to London, and it was too early in the war for the Royalists to contemplate taking London without the support of a sizeable part of its population.

With the end of the campaigning season close at hand, Charles decided not to press the issue and withdrew after a slight cannonade. Casualties on both sides were light, with fewer than 50 killed in total.

The Parliamentarians secured the battlefield without fully engaging, which was probably fortunate for them, as many of their number had never seen a battle before and were not used to army discipline formations and deployments. John Hampden urged the Earl of Essex to turn both flanks of the Royal army via Acton and Kingston; experienced professional soldiers, however, urged Essex not to trust the London men to hold their ground while his other troops manoeuvred. Hampden's advice was undoubtedly premature: something like the 1651 Battle of Worcester was not within the power of the Parliamentarians of 1642. In Napoleon's words: "one only manoeuvres around a fixed point", and the city levies at that time were certainly not, vis-à-vis Rupert's cavalry, a fixed point.

== Aftermath ==
Charles, once more contrary to Rupert's advice, retreated back up the Thames Valley towards Oxford, losing the possible chance for a flanking movement through loyal Kent. He set up his headquarters there for the rest of the war; never again during the civil war would the Royalists come as close to capturing London, and without London they could not win the war.

== The site today ==
The site of the battle was then open fields, but is now urbanised, forming part of the Chiswick area of London. Most of the Turnham Green itself has been lost, though a small park retains the name, and another park (Back Common/Acton Green) preserves some of the open battlefield area. Chiswick High Road (A315) still runs on almost the same alignment. The Battlefields Trust has erected information boards around the area.

The Parliamentary forces were deployed in a line running south from the location of the present-day Turnham Green station, to the grounds of Chiswick House, which had been built in c. 1610 (the current house was built in the 1720s on the same site). The slightly shorter Royalist line started just south of today's Chiswick Park station and extended southwards to the modern Great West Road.

== Sources ==
- "The Battle of Turnham Green". Chiswick W4.com. Neighbour Net. 19 November 2004.
- Marsh, Simon (March 2008). "Battle of Turnham Green". UK Battlefields Resource Centre. Battlefields Trust.
- Plant, David. "1642: First campaigns of the English Civil War". The British Civil Wars & Commonwealth website. Archived from the original on 9 December 2008.
- Robinson, Wayne (2020). "The Battle of Turnham Green, November 13, 1642". The Pike and Musket Society.
- Royle, Trevor (2004). The British Civil War: The Wars of the Three Kingdoms, 1638–1660. New York: Palgrave MacMillan. ISBN 0-312-29293-7.
- "UK Battlefields – Brentford and Turnham Green Battlefield Trails". battlefieldstrust.com.
