= List of military engagements of the English Civil War =

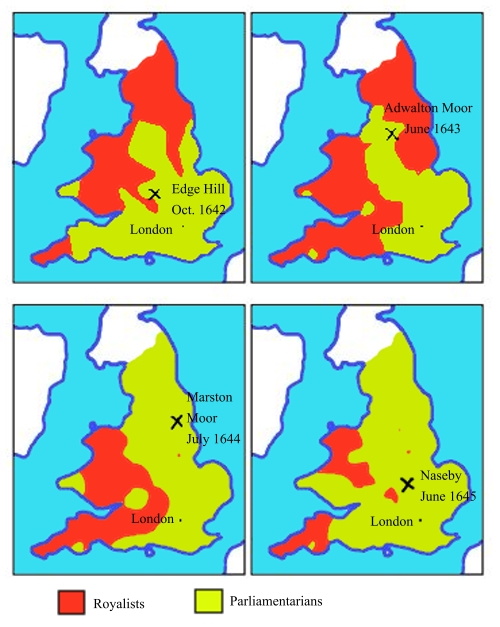
Maps of territory held by Royalists (red) and Parliamentarians (yellow-green), 1642–1645

The military engagements of the English Civil War took place between 1642 and 1651. This was a part of the Wars of the Three Kingdoms which took place from 1639 and 1653.

== Battles ==
Name	Location	Start date	End date	Result of the battle
Battle of Adwalton Moor	Adwalton	30 June 1643	30 June 1643	Royalist victory
Battle of Aldbourne Chase	Aldbourne	18 September 1643	18 September 1643	Inconclusive
Battle of Alton	Alton	13 December 1643	13 December 1643	Parliamentarian victory
Battle of Aylesbury	Aylesbury	1 November 1642	1 November 1642	Parliamentarian victory
Battle of Babylon Hill	Babylon Hill	7 September 1642	7 September 1642	Parliamentarian victory
Battle of Bovey Heath	Bovey Heath	9 January 1646	9 January 1646	Parliamentarian victory
Battle of Boldon Hill	Boldons	24 March 1644	24 March 1644	Inconclusive
Storming of Bolton	Bolton	28 May 1644	28 May 1644	Royalist victory
Battle of Braddock Down	Braddock Down	19 January 1643	19 January 1643	Royalist victory
Battle of Bramber Bridge	Bramber	13 December 1643	13 December 1643	Parliamentarian victory
Battle of Brentford	Brentford	12 November 1642	12 November 1642	Royalist victory
Storming of Bristol	Bristol	23 July 1643	26 July 1643	Royalist victory
Battle of Burton Bridge	Burton upon Trent	4 July 1643	4 July 1643	Royalist victory
Battle of Camp Hill	Camp Hill	3 April 1643	3 April 1643	Royalist victory
Battle of Chalgrove Field	Chalgrove	18 June 1643	18 June 1643	Royalist victory
Battle of Cheriton	Cheriton	29 March 1644	29 March 1644	Parliamentarian victory
Battle of Cropredy Bridge	Cropredy	29 June 1644	29 June 1644	Royalist victory
Battle of Y Dalar Hir	Y Dalar Hir	5 June 1648	5 June 1648	Parliamentarian victory
Battle of Denbigh Green	Denbigh	1 November 1645	1 November 1645	Parliamentarian victory
Battle of Dunbar	Dunbar	3 September 1650	3 September 1650	Parliamentarian victory
Battle of Edgehill	Edge Hill	23 October 1642	23 October 1642	Inconclusive
Storming of Farnham Castle	Farnham Castle	1 December 1642	1 December 1642	Parliamentarian victory
Battle of Gainsborough	Gainsborough	28 July 1643	28 July 1643	Parliamentarian victory
Battle of Gunnislake New Bridge	Gunnislake	20 July 1644	20 July 1644	Royalist victory
Battle of Heptonstall	Heptonstall	November 1643	November 1643	Parliamentarian victory
Battle of Hieton	Hieton	1 December 1650	1 December 1650	Parliamentarian victory
Battle of Hopton Heath	Hopton Heath	19 March 1643	19 March 1643	Inconclusive
Battle of Inverkeithing	Inverkeithing	20 July 1651	20 July 1651	Parliamentarian victory
Battle of Kings Norton	Kings Norton	17 October 1642	17 October 1642	Parliamentarian victory
Battle of Langport	Langport	10 July 1645	10 July 1645	Parliamentarian victory
Battle of Lansdowne	Lansdowne	5 July 1643	5 July 1643	Royalist victory
Battle of Leeds	Leeds	23 January 1643	23 January 1643	Parliamentarian victory
Battle of Lostwithiel	Lostwithiel	21 August 1644	2 September 1644	Royalist victory
Battle of Maidstone	Maidstone	1 June 1648	1 June 1648	Parliamentarian victory
Battle of Marshall's Elm	Marshall's Elm	4 August 1642	4 August 1642	Royalist victory
Battle of Marston Moor	Long Marston	2 July 1644	2 July 1644	Parliamentarian victory
First Battle of Middlewich	Middlewich	13 March 1643	13 March 1643	Parliamentarian victory
Second Battle of Middlewich	Middlewich	26 December 1643	26 December 1643	Royalist victory
Relief of Montgomery Castle	Montgomery Castle	18 September 1644	18 September 1644	Parliamentarian victory
Battle of Muster Green	Muster Green	1 December 1642	7 December 1642	Parliamentarian victory
Battle of Nantwich	Nantwich	25 January 1644	25 January 1644	Parliamentarian victory
Battle of Naseby	Naseby	14 June 1645	14 June 1645	Parliamentarian victory
Relief of Newark	Newark-on-Trent	21 March 1644	21 March 1644	Royalist victory
Battle of Newburn	Newburn	28 August 1640	28 August 1640	Covenanter victory
First Battle of Newbury	Newbury	20 September 1643	20 September 1643	Parliamentarian victory
Second Battle of Newbury	Newbury	27 October 1644	27 October 1644	Inconclusive
Battle of Olney Bridge	Olney	4 November 1643	4 November 1643	Parliamentarian victory
Battle of Ormskirk	Ormskirk	20 August 1644	20 August 1644	Parliamentarian victory
Battle of Oswestry	Oswestry	22 June 1644	23 June 1644	Parliamentarian victory
Battle of Piercebridge	Piercebridge	1 December 1642	1 December 1642	Royalist victory
Battle of Powick Bridge	Powick Bridge	23 September 1642	23 September 1642	Royalist victory
Battle of Preston	Preston	17 August 1648	17 August 1648	Parliamentarian victory
Battle of Ripple Field	Ripple	13 April 1643	13 April 1643	Royalist victory
Battle of Roundway Down	Roundway Down	13 July 1643	13 July 1643	Royalist victory
Battle of Rowton Heath	Rowton	24 September 1645	24 September 1645	Parliamentarian victory
Battle of Seacroft Moor	Seacroft	30 March 1643	30 March 1643	Royalist victory
Battle of Selby	Selby	11 April 1644	11 April 1644	Parliamentarian victory
Battle of Sherburn in Elmet	Sherburn in Elmet	15 October 1645	15 October 1645	Parliamentarian victory
Battle of Sourton Down	Sourton	25 April 1643	25 April 1643	Parliamentarian victory
Battle of South Harting	South Harting	23 November 1643	24 November 1643	Royalist victory
Battle of St Fagans	St Fagans	8 May 1648	8 May 1648	Parliamentarian victory
Battle of St Neots	St Neots	10 July 1648	10 July 1648	Parliamentarian victory
Battle of Stourbridge Heath	Stourbridge	26 March 1644	26 March 1644	Royalist victory
Battle of Stow-on-the-Wold	Stow-on-the-Wold	21 March 1646	21 March 1646	Parliamentarian victory
Battle of Stratton	Stratton	16 May 1643	16 May 1643	Royalist victory
Battle of Tadcaster	Tadcaster	7 December 1642	7 December 1642	Royalist victory
Battle of Tipton Green	Tipton Green	12 June 1644	12 June 1644	Inconclusive
Battle of Torrington	Torrington	16 February 1646	16 February 1646	Parliamentarian victory
Battle of Turnham Green	Turnham Green	13 November 1642	13 November 1642	Parliamentarian victory
Battle of Upton	Upton-upon-Severn	28 August 1651	28 August 1651	Parliamentarian victory
Capture of Wakefield	Wakefield	21 May 1643	21 May 1643	Parliamentarian victory
Battle of Warrington Bridge	Warrington Bridge	13 August 1651	13 August 1651	Parliamentarian victory
Battle of Weymouth	Weymouth	9 February 1645	9 February 1645	Royalist victory
Battle of Wigan Lane	Wigan	25 August 1651	25 August 1651	Parliamentarian victory
Battle of Winceby	Winceby	11 October 1643	11 October 1643	Parliamentarian victory
Battle of Winwick	Winwick	19 August 1648	19 August 1648	Parliamentarian victory
Battle of Worcester	Worcester	3 September 1651	3 September 1651	Parliamentarian victory

=== Sieges ===
Name	Location	Start date	End date	Result of the battle
Siege of Arundel	Arundel	19 December 1643	6 January 1644	Parliamentarian victory
Siege of Basing House	Basing House	6 November 1643 Second Siege 4 June 1644 Third Siege October 1645	15 November 1643 Second Siege 15 November 1644 Third Siege October 1645	Parliamentarian victory
First siege of Bradford	Bradford	December 1642	December 1642	Parliamentarian victory
Second siege of Bradford	Bradford	July 1643	July 1643	Royalist victory

- Siege of Bridgwater (1645)
- Siege of Bristol (1645)
- Siege of Chester
- Siege of Chichester
- Chudleigh Fort
- Siege of Colchester
- Siege of Exeter (1642)
- Siege of Gloucester
- Great Siege of Scarborough Castle
- Siege of Helmsley Castle
- Siege of Hereford
- Siege of High Ercall Hall
- Siege of Hull (1642)
- Siege of Hull (1643)
- Siege of Lathom House
- Siege of Lichfield
- Siege of Lincoln
- Siege of Lyme Regis
- Siege of Newcastle
- Siege of Oxford
- Siege of Pembroke
- Siege of Plymouth
- Siege of Portsmouth
- Siege of Reading
- Storming of Shelford House
- Sieges of Taunton
- Siege of Tiverton (1645)
- Siege of Wardour Castle
- Siege of Worcester
- Siege of Worcester (1643)
- Siege of York

== First English Civil War ==
=== Timelines ===
- First English Civil War, 1642
- First English Civil War, 1643
- First English Civil War, 1644
- First English Civil War, 1645
- First English Civil War, 1646

=== Engagements ===
- Army Plots (1641)
- Siege of Basing House
- Battle of Burton Bridge (1643)
- Battle of Boldon Hill
- Battle of Bramber Bridge
- By the Sword Divided
- Siege of Helmsley Castle
- Meeting on Heworth Moor
- Irish Confederate expedition to Scotland
- Battle of Muster Green
- Battle of Nantwich
- First Battle of Newbury
- Siege of Newcastle
- Siege of Oxford
- Battle of Piercebridge
- Battle of Powick Bridge
- Storming of Shelford House
- Siege money (Newark)
- Siege of Carlisle (1644)
- Siege of Hereford
- Siege of Hull (1642)
- Siege of Worcester
- Siege of York
- Solemn League and Covenant
- Battle of South Harting
- Storming of Bolton
- Battle of Tadcaster
- Battle of Tipton Green
- Treaty of Uxbridge

== Second English Civil War ==
- Battle of Preston (1648)
- Battle of St Fagans
- Battle of St Neots (1648)
- Corkbush Field mutiny
- Battle of Y Dalar Hir
- Great Blow
- Battle of Maidstone
- Siege of Pembroke
- Scottish invasion of England (1648)
- Siege of Colchester
- Battle of Winwick
