= Dorset in the English Civil War =

English Civil War in Dorset

Dorset was a significant theatre of conflict in the English Civil War. Significant sieges include those at Corfe Castle and Sherborne Castle.

== Background ==
Dorset was majority Royalist, except for in Lyme Regis and in Poole.

== 1642 ==
The Battle of Babylon Hill was fought at Babylon Hill in 1642, but the conflict was inconclusive.

== 1643 ==
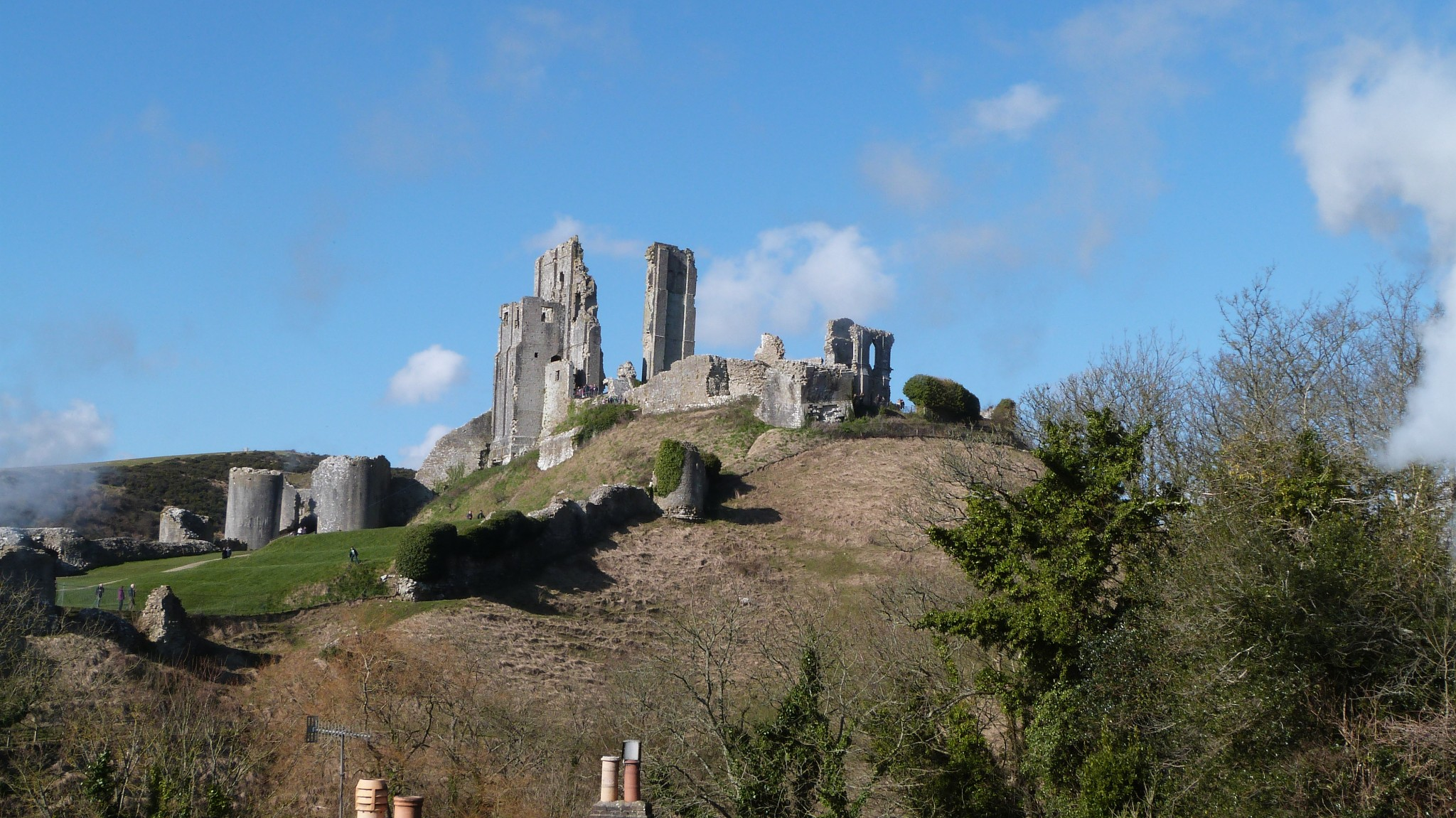
The Royalist stronghold Corfe Castle was destroyed in the English Civil War

Mary Bankes was a Royalist who defended Corfe Castle from a three-year siege inflicted by the parliamentarians.

Portland Castle was captured by a group of Royalists who gained access by pretending to be Parliamentary soldiers.

== 1644 ==
The Siege of Lyme Regis was an eight-week blockade of Lyme Regis.

== 1645 ==
The Battle of Weymouth took place.
