= Trolleybuses in South Shields =

South Shields trolleybus system

Operation
- Locale: South Shields, County Durham, England
- Open: 12 October 1936
- Close: 29 April 1964
- Status: Closed
- Routes: 11
- Operator: South Shields Corporation Transport

Infrastructure
- Electrification: V DC parallel overhead lines
- Stock: 61 (maximum)

The South Shields trolleybus system once served the town of South Shields, then in County Durham, but now in Tyne and Wear, England. Opened on 12 October 1936, it gradually replaced the South Shields Corporation Tramways.

By the standards of the various now defunct trolleybus systems in the United Kingdom, the South Shields system was a medium-sized one, with a total of 11 routes, and a maximum fleet of 61 trolleybuses. It was closed on 29 April 1964.

One of the former South Shields trolleybuses is now preserved, at the Trolleybus Museum at Sandtoft, Lincolnshire.

== See also ==
- History of South Shields
- Transport in South Shields
- Transport in Tyne and Wear
- List of trolleybus systems in the United Kingdom
