= Helmsley Castle =

Medieval castle in Yorkshire, England

- Helmsley, North Yorkshire
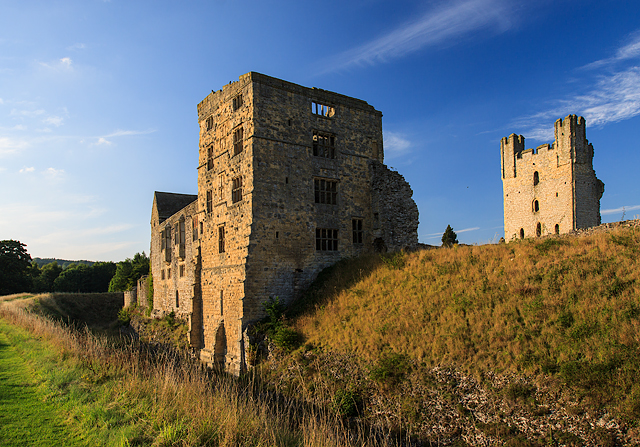
- Helmsley Castle

Site information
- Controlled by: English Heritage
- Condition: Ruins

Location
- Location within North Yorkshire
- Coordinates: 54.2448°N 1.0643°W
- Grid reference: grid reference SE6183

Site history
- Demolished: English Civil War

Helmsley Castle (also known anciently as Hamlake) is a medieval castle situated in the market town of Helmsley, within the North York Moors National Park, North Yorkshire, England.

== History ==
Although the estate of Helmsley was granted to Robert, Count of Mortain following the Norman Conquest; there is no evidence that he built a castle in the area. The castle, constructed in wood around 1120, was built by Walter l'Espec. It is positioned on a rocky outcrop overlooking the River Rye. Featuring double ditches surrounding a rectangular inner bailey, the castle bears little resemblance to the motte and bailey castles built at the time (such as the nearby Pickering Castle). The castle at Helmsley was only 1.9 miles (3 km) from Rievaulx Abbey and Walter l'Espec granted the land for the abbey. Aelred, who was the abbey's first novice master, was known to be involved in l'Espec's affairs (military and personally) and Helmsley was often used as a place of safety during periods of instability.

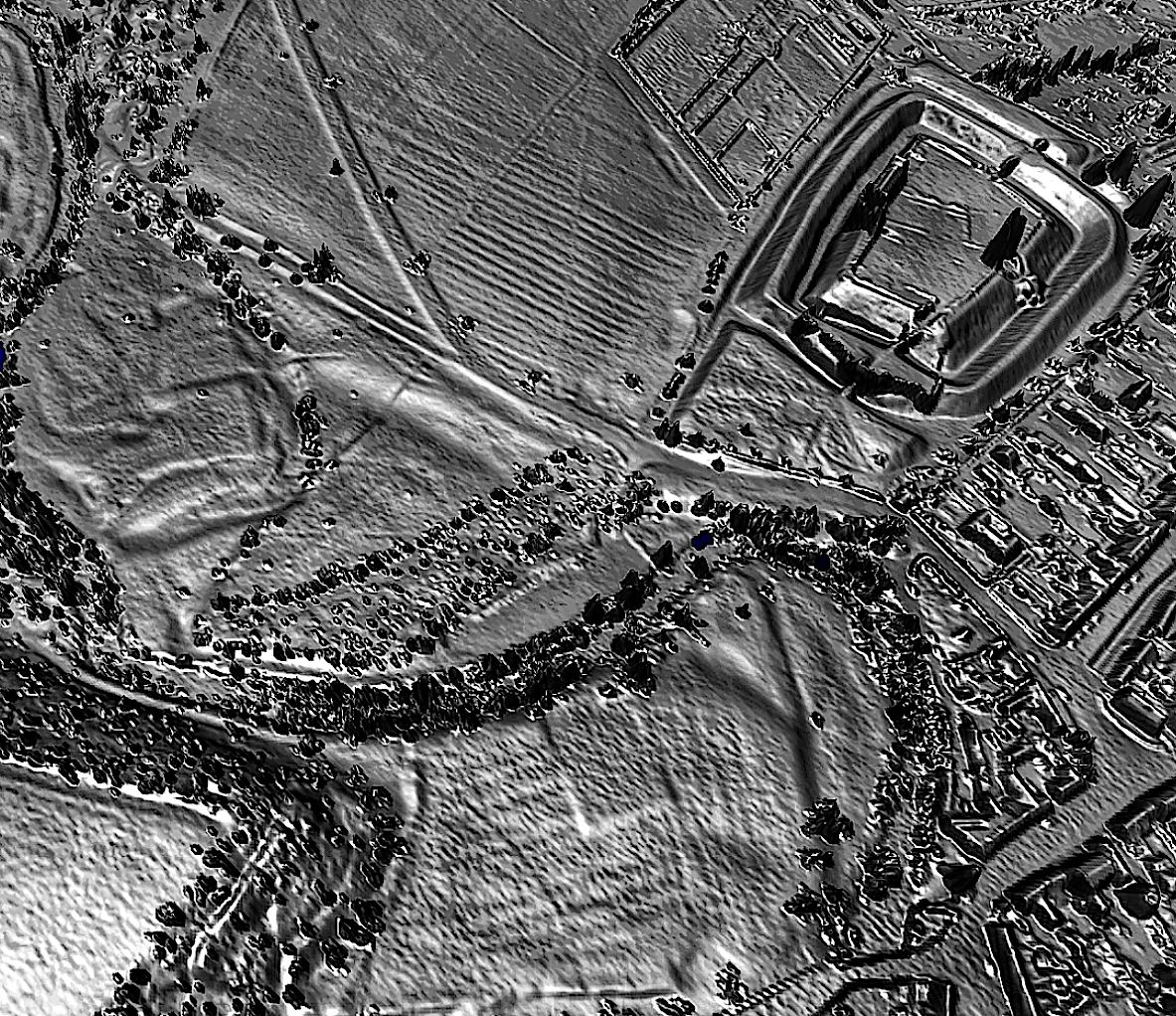
A lidar view of the castle

Walter had no surviving children although tradition claims he had a son who died falling from his horse when young, and on Walter's death in 1153 the castle passed to his sister Adelina who had married Peter de Roos. In 1186 Robert de Ros, son of Everard de Ros, began work on converting the castle to stone. He built two main towers, the round corner towers and the main gateway on the south side of the castle. He died in 1227, granting the castle to his older son William who lived there from 1227 to 1258. The only change made to the castle during this time was the construction of the chapel in the courtyard.

William's son, Robert, inherited the castle and was Lord of Helmsley from 1258 to 1285. His marriage to Isabel d'Aubigny (heiress to Belvoir Castle) funded the building of the new hall and kitchen, as well as strengthening the castle. This may include the building of the impressive south barbican which was constructed between 1227 and 1285. He built a wall dividing the castle into north and south sides, with the southern half for the private use of the lord's family in the new hall and east tower, and the northern half containing the old hall to be used by the steward and other castle officials. The strengthening of the castle continued into Robert's son William's life. William de Ros II died in 1316. The East Tower may have been heightened specifically for the visit of King Edward III, who stayed at the castle for around five days in 1334.

Helmsley Castle remained in the possession of the de Roos family until 1478 when Edmund de Roos sold it to Richard, Duke of Gloucester who later became Richard III. Richard did nothing to the castle, staying instead at Middleham Castle. After Richard III's death at the Battle of Bosworth, Helmsley Castle was restored to Edmund de Roos by Henry VII.

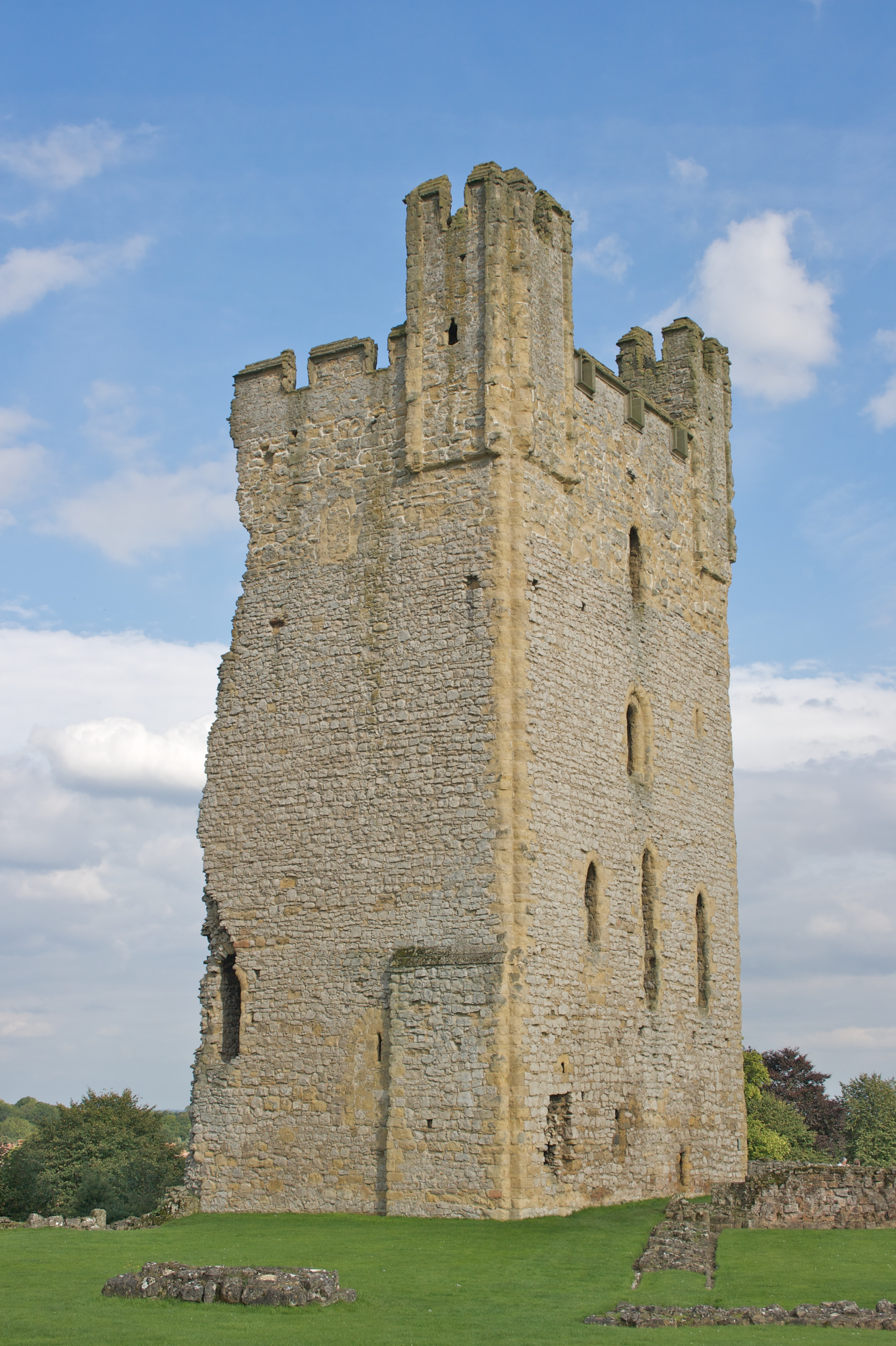
The remains of the East Tower

Edmund died childless in 1508 and the castle passed to his cousin Sir George Manners of Etal on whose death in 1513 his son Thomas inherited it. He was created Earl of Rutland in 1525. On his death in 1543, Thomas was succeeded by his son, Henry, but it was under the rule of his grandson Edward, that the castle was altered next. He had the old hall converted into a Tudor mansion, converted the 13th-century chapel into a kitchen linked to the old hall by a covered gallery, and knocked the new hall down. The south barbican was converted into a more comfortable residence at this time. A letter of April 1578 describes the slow progress of the mason's work (and the payment of £10 to the mason), and that timber was available for a gallery in the attic of the mansion. On Edward's death in 1587 his brother John Manners inherited the castle, followed by John's son Roger, and then Roger's younger brother Francis. On the death of Francis in 1632 the castle passed to his young grandson George Villiers, 2nd Duke of Buckingham.

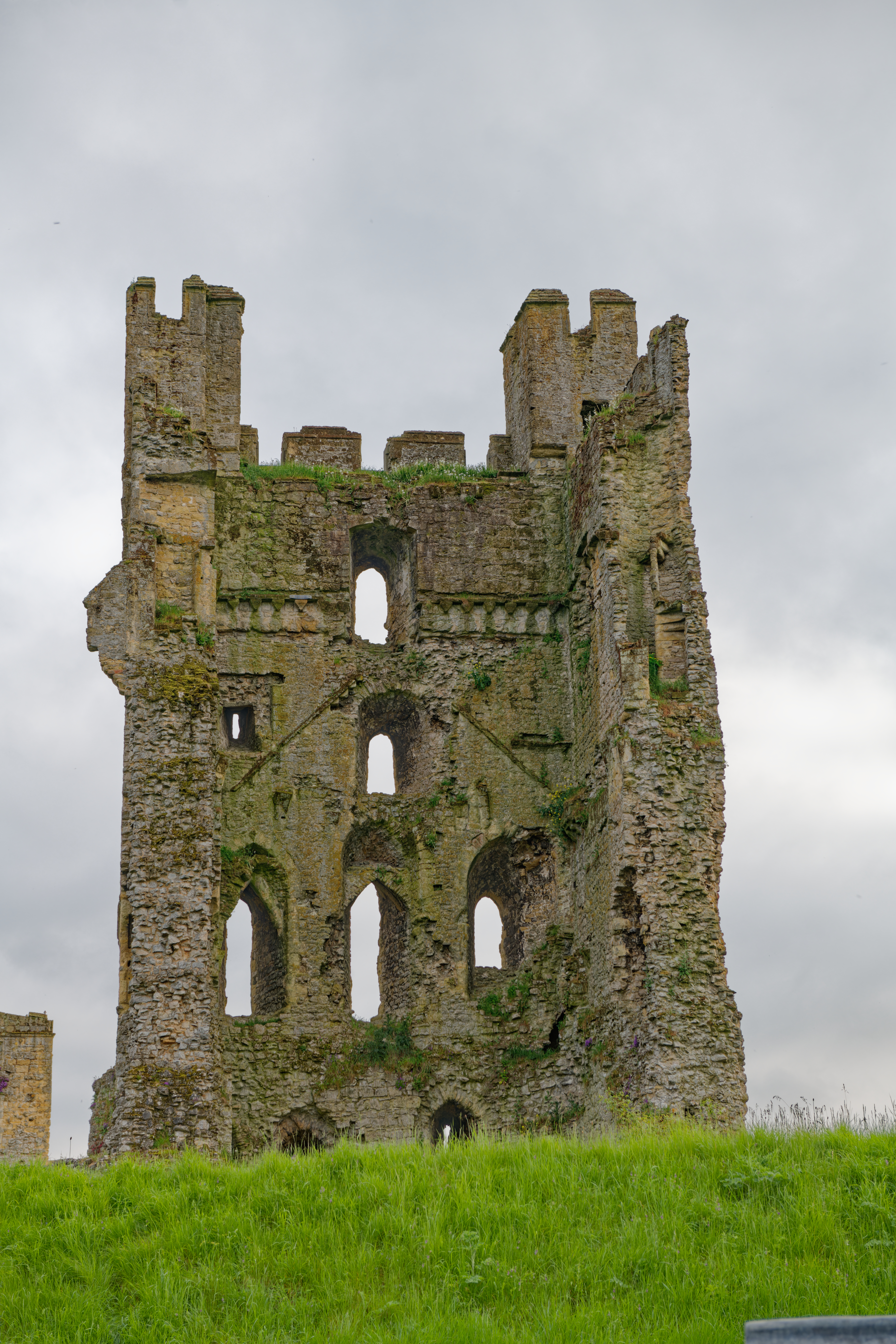
The East Tower from the town side, blown up in Civil War slighting

During the English Civil War, the castle was besieged by Sir Thomas Fairfax in 1644. Sir Jordan Crosland held it for the king for three months before surrendering. Parliament ordered the castle to be slighted and much of the walls, gates and part of the east tower were destroyed. However the mansion was spared. See Siege of Helmsley Castle for further information.

In 1657, Villiers married Mary Fairfax, daughter of the same Sir Thomas Fairfax who had besieged Helmsley. After Villiers' death without heirs in 1687, the castle was sold to Charles Duncombe in 1695. He was a banker and politician who was knighted in 1699 and became Lord Mayor of London in 1708. The 40,000 acre estate was purchased for the sum of £90,000 (roughly £11,000,000 in 2018). His sister Mary's husband, Thomas Brown, inherited the castle on Charles's death in 1711. Thomas changed his name to Duncombe. He hired William Wakefield, a protégé of Sir John Vanbrugh, to build a country house at Duncombe Park overlooking the castle, and left the castle to decay. The castle was designed as a picturesque backdrop for the Duncombe Park estate, and was even sketched by J. M. W. Turner. As the castle fell into disrepair the local community took advantage of the site to hold fêtes, pageants and even agricultural shows. The vicar of All Saints' Church, Charles Norris Gray, often held events in the castle throughout the latter part of the 19th century. The castle passed into the hands of the Office of Works in 1923 (under the guardianship of Sir Charles Peers), who began the clearing of debris and trees from the site. The castle's remarkable earthworks were planned to be part of an anti-tank defence during the Second World War. Although it is still owned by Lord Feversham's family, of Duncombe Park, the castle is now in the care of English Heritage.

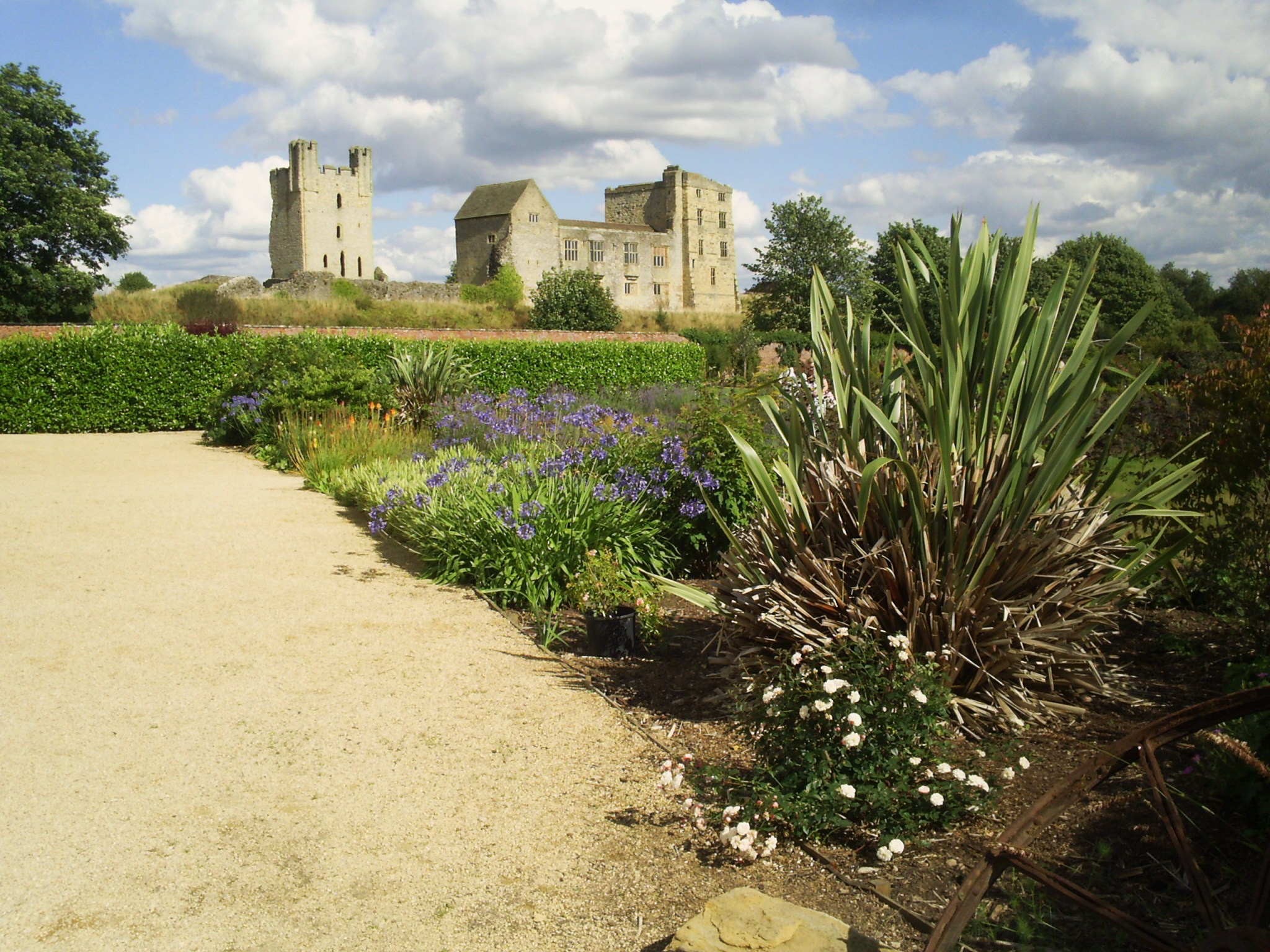
Helmsley Castle viewed from its walled garden to its west. The original keep is on the left. The buildings to the right are residential apartments added in the 1500s.

== See also ==
- Castles in Great Britain and Ireland
- List of castles in England
- Grade I listed buildings in North Yorkshire (district)
- Listed buildings in Helmsley
