= History of South Shields =

The first settlers of the South Shields area were the Brigantes, although there is no evidence they built a settlement at South Shields. The Romans built a fort there to help supply Hadrian's Wall. Many ruins still exist today. The fort was abandoned as the empire declined.

In the 6th century, northeast England became a centre of education as part of the Kingdom of Northumbria. The Vikings raided the area in the 9th century, establishing settlements and controlling most of northern England.

The town was founded in 1245, and developed as a fishing port. Salt-panning became began in 1499. During the Civil War, parliament's Scottish allies captured the town, leading the royalists to flee south, leading to the Battle of Boldon Hill.

In the Victorian era, coal mining led to a boom in the town, increasing from 12,000 in 1801 to 75,000 by the 1860s. The rapid growth made sanitation a problem. In the 1850s, shipbuilding became a prominent industry.

Zeppelin airships attacked the town in World War I, and Nazi air raids caused damage and death in World War II. Throughout the 20th century, industry declined and services and tourism played an increasing role in the economy.

== Foundation and Roman Times ==
The earliest inhabitants of the area were the Brigantes, a strong and fiercely independent Briton tribe however there is no evidence to suggest they built a settlement where the present day town now stands. It was John Leland in the 16th century who first suggested the town had been known as 'Caer Urfa.' The Brythonic word 'Caer' meaning a fortified place or seat of royal power, 'Urfa' is suggested to be a simple corruption of 'Vide Infra' the Aramaic name for the Roman stronghold. (broken link)

A large Roman fort has been excavated in South Shields on the Lawe Top, overlooking the River Tyne; it has been the setting for an investigation by the Channel 4 archaeological television programme Time Team. Founded c. AD 120 the fort is mentioned in The Notitia Dignitatum (a list of forts and bases compiled in the 4th century) where it is referred to as Arbeia. Arbeia, meaning "place of the Arabs" (one of the garrisons being the Tigris Boatmen from modern day Iraq), was intended as the maritime supply fort for Hadrian's Wall, and contains the only permanent stone-built granaries yet found in Britain. It was occupied until the Romans left Britain in the 5th century. A Roman gatehouse and barracks have been reconstructed on their original foundations, while a museum holds artefacts such as an altarpiece to a previously unknown god, and a Roman-era gravestone set up by a native Palmyrene to his freedwoman and wife, a Briton of the Catuvellauni tribe. There is also a tablet with the name of the emperor Alexander Severus (died 235) chiselled off. The fort was at the end of a road named Wrekendike, connected to a larger road which led between Newcastle (Pons Aelivs) and Chester-Le-Street (Congangis); parts of this road are still visible in Wrekenton near Gateshead. The Romans also built a small wharf in nearby Marsden Bay for the purposes of loading sandstone from a quarry. The wharf's remnants are still extant, although time and tide have left little to see. Arbeia was abandoned by the Romans c. 400, when Emperor Honorius informed the people of Britain that they must look to their own country's defence. One of the many peoples to take advantage of the Roman Empire's collapse were the Anglo-Saxons.

== Dark Ages ==
Britain in the 6th century is often considered a confused and violent place, the Romans taking their laws, gods and legions with them, when they left. However, the north east of England became a centre of learning and education, a beacon of light throughout Europe. King Oswald of Northumbria united the kingdoms of Bernicia to the north of the River Tees and Deira to the South creating the powerful and influential Kingdom of Northumbria. In AD 647 King Oswy of Northumbria (Oswald's Brother) at the request of St. Aidan allowed a monastery to be built. The site today is in the very town centre of South Shields and is named St. Hilda's Church although the original Anglo-Saxon building is but a remnant under the present Norman nave. St. Hilda's was one of many monastic institutions along the coast of north east England including Jarrow, where the Venerable Bede lived and worked.

C. AD 865 the monastery at St. Hilda's was raided by the Vikings. However the Vikings or Danes weren't just raiders; they created settlements, brought new customs, laws and Gods, effectively controlling all of northern England. This form of government was known as the Danelaw. The Anglian (or Danish) influence can be seen to this day; the Geordie accent which contains words of Danish origin and has many more Anglo-Saxon pronunciations than standard English.

== Middle Ages ==
In 1100 the Normans built St Hilda's church where the nunnery once stood, in the town's market place. The church remains one of the oldest churches in the UK.

The first reference to 'Scheles' (fishermens' huts) occurs in 1235, and the town proper was founded by the Prior and Convent of Durham in 1245. On account of the complaints of the burgesses of Newcastle upon Tyne, an order was made in 1258, stipulating that no ships should be laden or unladen at Shields, and that no shoars or quays should be built there. However, South Shields subsequently developed as a fishing port.

Salt panning along the Tyne began in 1499 and achieved major importance; Daniel Defoe speaks of the clouds of smoke being visible for miles, while a witness in 1743 mentions two hundred boiling-pans. Glass manufacturing was begun by Isaac Cookson in the 1730s and there were eight glass works by 1827. Coal mining and chemical manufacture also became important. South Shields had the largest alkali works in the world.

In 1644, during the English Civil War, Parliament's Scottish allies under Alexander Leslie, 1st Earl of Leven wanted to capture the Tyne and Newcastle upon Tyne. Leslie captured the fort on the Lawe Top, following a lengthy siege. After the capture, the Royalist forces retreated to the south and evidence suggests a consequential skirmish may have occurred in the small town of Boldon, the ensuing skirmish is known as the Battle of Boldon Hill, though the topography of Boldon is not favourable for a battle.

== 19th century ==
Following the Reform Act 1832, championed by Lord Grey and the Whigs, County Durham was able to return two members for two divisions, and the boroughs of Gateshead and South Shields acquired representation.

The coal industry flourished in Victorian times, drawing immigrants from far and wide. In South Shields the population soared from approximately 12,000 in 1801 to 75,000 by the late 1860s. Collieries in South Shields included:

- Templetown (1805–1826)
- St. Hilda's (1810–1940)
- West Harton (1844–1969)
- Boldon (1869–1982)
- Marsden (1879–1968)
- Whitburn (1879–1968)
- Westoe (1909–1993)

Coal mining was very hazardous. Shafts could collapse at any time and before the safety lamp was invented in 1815 naked flames carried by miners to light their way could ignite gas underground causing explosions and many deaths. Some mines even had shafts that stretched several miles out under the sea.

Overcrowding in the town made sanitation a problem, partly solved by Cleadon Water Pumping Station (a large tower erected in 1858 above the town following an outbreak of cholera).

South Shields' place at the mouth of the Tyne with shifting and unpredictable sand bars and channels into the river meant that ships frequently ran aground. Following one such incident the world's first self-righting lifeboat was designed by William Wouldhave in 1790.

In the 1850s, with the Tyne's growing shipbuilding industry and the mouth of the Tyne. South and North Shields needed to stop the flow of sand that threatened shipping. In 1854 the first foundations were laid of the North and South Piers. They were both completed in 1885. In the 1870s, from 1874 to 1876, St Bede's Catholic Church was built in South Shields.

An engineering problem was encountered in managing the new piers. The sand on Littlehaven Beach was now flowing up the Tyne through the incoming tide. As a solution the Herd Groyne Pier was erected in 1882.

South Shields-born Charles Palmer opened his shipyard in 1851 at Jarrow, at first building wooden ships and then moving onto iron. His shipyard patented rolled armour-plate for warships. In 1865 Alderman John Readhead founded his shipyard John Readhead & Sons in South Shields, which built small cargo ships and colliers for clients the world over until the yard was closed in 1968. Various slipways and dry docks can still be seen today stretching from Tyne Dock towards the mouth of the Tyne.

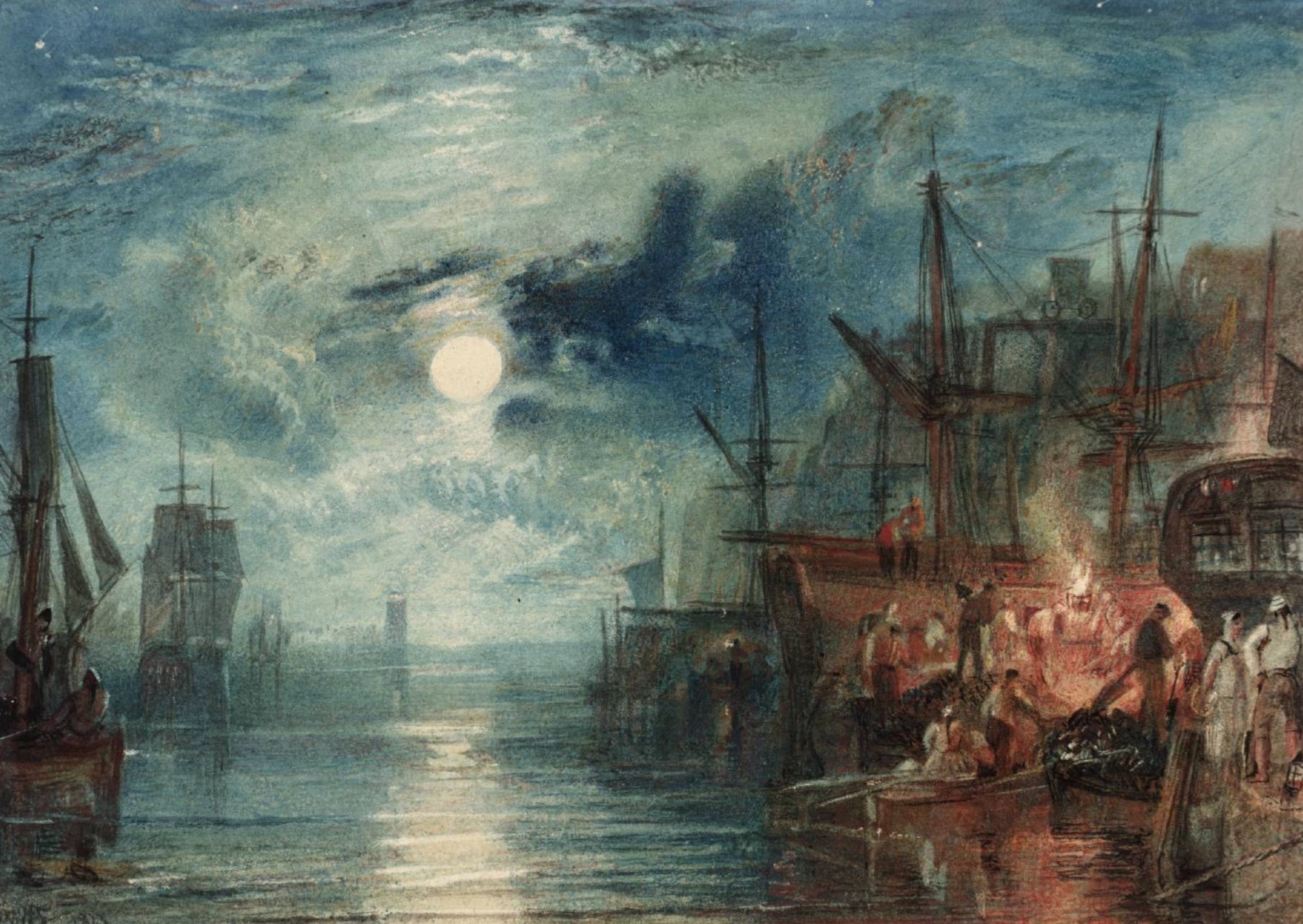
Shields on the River Tyne by J. M. W. Turner, 1823

Turner made an engraving of Shields on the River Tyne in 1823. This is now in Tate Britain in London. He also painted Keelmen Hauling Coals by Night in 1835, having himself rowed out into the Tyne at Jarrow Slake in order to do so.

The town became famous for its maritime industries and the Marine School was founded by Dr. Thomas Winterbottom in 1837. Originally in Ocean Road, it is now part of South Tyneside College in Westoe Village and has an international reputation. From the late 1980s to 2008 it possessed the nationally unique combined public observatory and planetarium, which has provided education and entertainment for twenty thousand children a year. During the industrial boom years of the 19th century, many notable public buildings were built across the town, reflecting its wealth. These included the Customs House of 1848.

South Shields was incorporated as a municipal borough in 1850 under the Municipal Corporations Act 1835. It became a county borough in 1889 with the passing of the Local Government Act 1888, and remained as such until 1974 when it became part of the Metropolitan Borough of South Tyneside in the (now former) county of Tyne and Wear.

The Shields Gazette, founded in 1849, is the oldest provincial evening newspaper in the United Kingdom.

== 20th century ==
In 1908–1909, The Harton Coal Company (which by this time owned all of the collieries in South Shields and the surrounding area, as well as the Marsden limestone quarries) embarked on a scheme to almost completely electrify their collieries, both above and below ground, including the network of lines connecting the collieries at St. Hilda, Harton and Westoe (then known as Benthouse) to staithes on the river. Wagons of coal from Boldon and Whitburn were steam-hauled to sidings in the town, where they could be collected by electric locomotives. Siemens carried out the electrification work, as well as supplying the locomotives for use on the electrified sections of the railway. When this work was completed, the electricity used by the HCC at the five collieries amounted to around 6% of that available to the coal industry as a whole, which for a time made it one of the largest single users of electricity in the entire country. The last of the "Harton Electrics" were retired in 1989. Four of the locomotives are preserved: E4 at the Stephenson Railway Museum, E2 at Beamish Museum, with E10 and the AEG-built E9 at the Tanfield Railway. The Rattler pub on the seafront is named after the passenger service run primarily for miners by the HCC between Westoe Lane Station and Whitburn Colliery, using a motley collection of second-hand rolling stock, which gave a very rough ride and resulted in its rather unflattering nickname. Most of the trackbed of the colliery railway has either been built on or turned into footpaths.

The impressive South Shields Town Hall of 1910 bears a copper weather vane in the form of a galleon. The town's crest (pre-1974) featured the lifeboat and the associated motto – Always Ready – which was later adopted as the motto of South Tyneside.

Zeppelin airships raided the Tyne in World War I and the town's seafront amusement park was attacked in 1915. In World War II, South Shields suffered well over 200 air raid alerts and 156 people were killed. Many houses were damaged, particularly by incendiary bombs and parachute mines. One direct hit on the market place killed more than 40 people who had taken shelter in tunnels below the square. There was a memorial to them in the form of a cobbled Union Flag on the ground of the market square, however, this was removed as part of an overhaul of the town centre in the late 1990s.

South Shields lost more seafarers than any other port in Britain during World War II.

The celebrated artist L S Lowry spent frequent periods at the Seaburn Hotel in Sunderland, and painted a number of works in South Shields.

Historically the town was part of County Durham, but it became part of Tyne and Wear in 1974.

In 1977 the town was visited by boxer Muhammad Ali, whose wedding was blessed in the local mosque at Laygate. The visit has since been the subject of a BBC documentary. Ali visited the town after receiving an invitation from a local boys' boxing club.

On 1 September 1987, Johnny Cash performed an open-air concert at Bents Park. Recently a 'lost' interview was discovered, the only interview granted by Cash just before this show.

South Shields has undergone significant economic change in the light of de-industrialisation. Service industries, including tourism and retail, play an increasing role in the economic make-up of the town and indeed across the wider area.

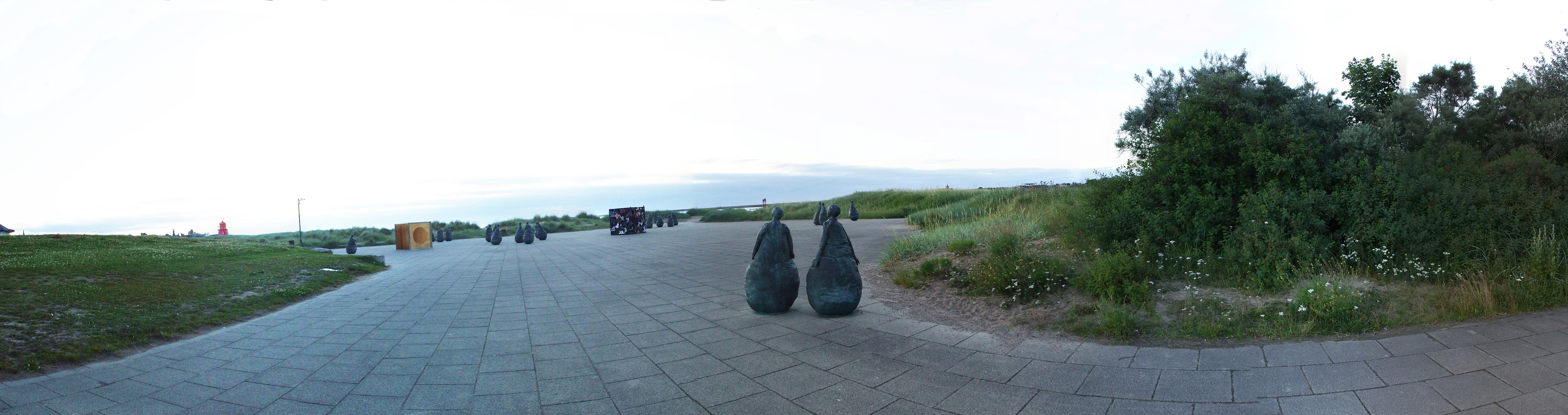
Created by acclaimed Spanish sculptor, Juan Muñoz in 1999. Celebrating the Tyne Salmon; here with the 2008 Tyne Bluetooth Salmon Trail Cubes, are the 22 bronze life size figures that command and celebrate a superb view of South Shields Harbour and the Tyne Piers.
