= John Marlay (MP) =

Sir John Marley or Marlay (1590–1673) was an English merchant, military commander and politician of the seventeenth century. He is best remembered for his heroic defence of Newcastle upon Tyne during the English Civil War, when he held the town for seven months against a besieging army on behalf of King Charles I. In poverty and desperation, he later betrayed the Royalist cause which he had served so loyally, and as a result, to the end of his life, he was reviled by many of his former comrades as a traitor.

His name is commemorated by Marlay House and Park near Dublin city, which belonged to a branch of his family who had settled in Ireland.

== Early career ==
He was the eldest son of William Marley (or Marlay): his father was a Hostman and a Merchant Adventurer in Newcastle upon Tyne. His mother's name is unknown. John became an alehouse keeper and then a colliery owner, Hostman & Merchant Adventurer: the latter occupation brought him great wealth, with an estimated income of £4500 a year, and he ran a victualling business as well. He was prominent in local Government from the late 1630s: he was three times Mayor of Newcastle-upon-Tyne, his native town, and represented that constituency in the House of Commons from 1661 until his death. He was knighted in 1639. He obtained the victualling contract for the English Army during the First Bishops' War.

== Siege of Newcastle ==
See main article: Siege of Newcastle

During the English Civil War he was appointed by King Charles I as military Governor of Newcastle-upon-Tyne, as well as being its Mayor 1642–44, and he defended the town with great spirit during the lengthy siege of 1644. He held off the besieging Scots army for seven months, and on 17 October he refused to surrender the town even after the Scots army had mined the walls. When the town was stormed on 19 October, he and the garrison fought their way from street to street, then retreated into the Castle. He held out there for another three days, and then surrendered on the promise of mercy for himself and his men. However Hodgson has the siege lasting from 13 August to 20 October. Charleton concurs as to the start and has the town in possession by the Scots on 19 October with Sir John and his officers retreating to the Castle keep for four days. With him were several Scots lords including Ludovic Lindsay, 16th Earl of Crawford, Robert Maxwell, 1st Earl of Nithsdale, and Lord Reed, together with their fellow Royalists Sir Nicholas Cole, 1st Baronet of Brancepeth Castle, Sir George Baker (Recorder of Newcastle), and the clergyman Dr. George Wishart, later Bishop of Edinburgh.

== Exile and treason ==
The promise of mercy was kept, but the Royalist leaders did not escape punishment entirely. Lord Crawford was threatened with the death penalty, although it was not carried out, and Dr. Wishart was imprisoned for a time. For the offence of having refused the terms of surrender, Marlay was proscribed, banished and driven into exile: for the next few years, he lived mainly in the Spanish Netherlands. Parliament forfeited his estates, and sold his collieries, and he sank into wretched poverty. He was reduced to such desperate straits that in 1658 he offered to sell to Oliver Cromwell all the Royalists' plans for the restoration of Charles II, in return for £100 and permission to return home, although he insisted, rather ludicrously, that "he would do nothing underhand". His reputation never recovered from this act of treason: John Thurloe, Cromwell's spymaster, thought that it was a terrible blow to the Royalist cause. Marley returned to England, but the Government ignored his pleas for money, and he was clearly still regarded as a Royalist at heart, since he was briefly imprisoned in 1659 after the failure of Booth's Uprising in favour of the exiled King.

== Restoration ==
At the Restoration of Charles II Marley, despite his questionable loyalties, had little to fear from the new regime: the King's promise of mercy to his opponents in the Declaration of Breda was generously fulfilled in the Indemnity and Oblivion Act 1660. No act of mercy however could redeem Marley's ruined reputation. He was elected to the Commons in 1661 as MP for Newcastle, but quickly found that his betrayal had not been forgiven or forgotten. A petition was sent to the Commons, directly accusing him of treason, and he was suspended from the House. Charles II, true to his policy of reconciliation, sent a message asking the House to forgive Marlay for his "infirmities", and to recover their former "good opinion" of him. Marlay also became Mayor of Newcastle again for the last time in 1661.

He was allowed to resume his seat in the Commons, but after this disastrous start to his national political career he never made his mark as a politician, and for the rest of his life had to endure accusations of being a traitor. Although he was appointed to a number of committees, he made only one recorded speech in the House in his 12 years as a member (although even this puts him slightly above the average: J.P. Kenyon notes that the great majority of MPs in the seventeenth century never once opened their mouths at Westminster). Even his conduct during the Siege of Newcastle was questioned, and there were wild accusations that he had been bribed to betray the town.

By 1665 he was prospering again. Hearth Tax records for that year show his house had more than ten hearths. The average for other merchant Hostmen was 5.7.

== Reputation ==
While his courage and determination at the Siege of Newcastle won him some respect, contemporaries, in general, had little good to say of him. Sir George Downing said that Marley "belonged to anyone who spoke kindly to him". The Earl of Northumberland dismissed him as a "cuckold and a knave". (It is worth noting, however, that both Downing and Northumberland fought on the opposite side to Marlay in the Civil Wars and were unlikely to be well-disposed towards him). In 1671 Sam Hartlib, a son of the renowned scholar Samuel Hartlib, who blamed Marley for persecuting his father (who had died in poverty), insulted him at the door of the House of Commons, calling him "less than the dust beneath my feet". He was noted for his hostility to Puritanism.

Sir John died in Newcastle in 1673 and was buried on 24 October in St George's Porch of St Nicholas's Church, now Newcastle Cathedral.

== Family and memorials ==
He married Mary Mitford, of whose marital fidelity Lord Northumberland spoke so unkindly. She was the daughter of Henry Mitford, a mercer. They had at least two sons. Of his children, most is known of Anthony, who moved to Ireland and became a prosperous landowner. Many of his Irish descendants achieved distinction, notably Thomas Marlay, Lord Chief Justice of Ireland, and Thomas's grandson, the statesman Henry Grattan. The family name is commemorated in Marlay Park, a popular amenity near Dublin city: the prominent banker David La Touche, who built Marlay House, named it for his wife Elizabeth Marlay, who was Sir John Marlay's great-granddaughter.

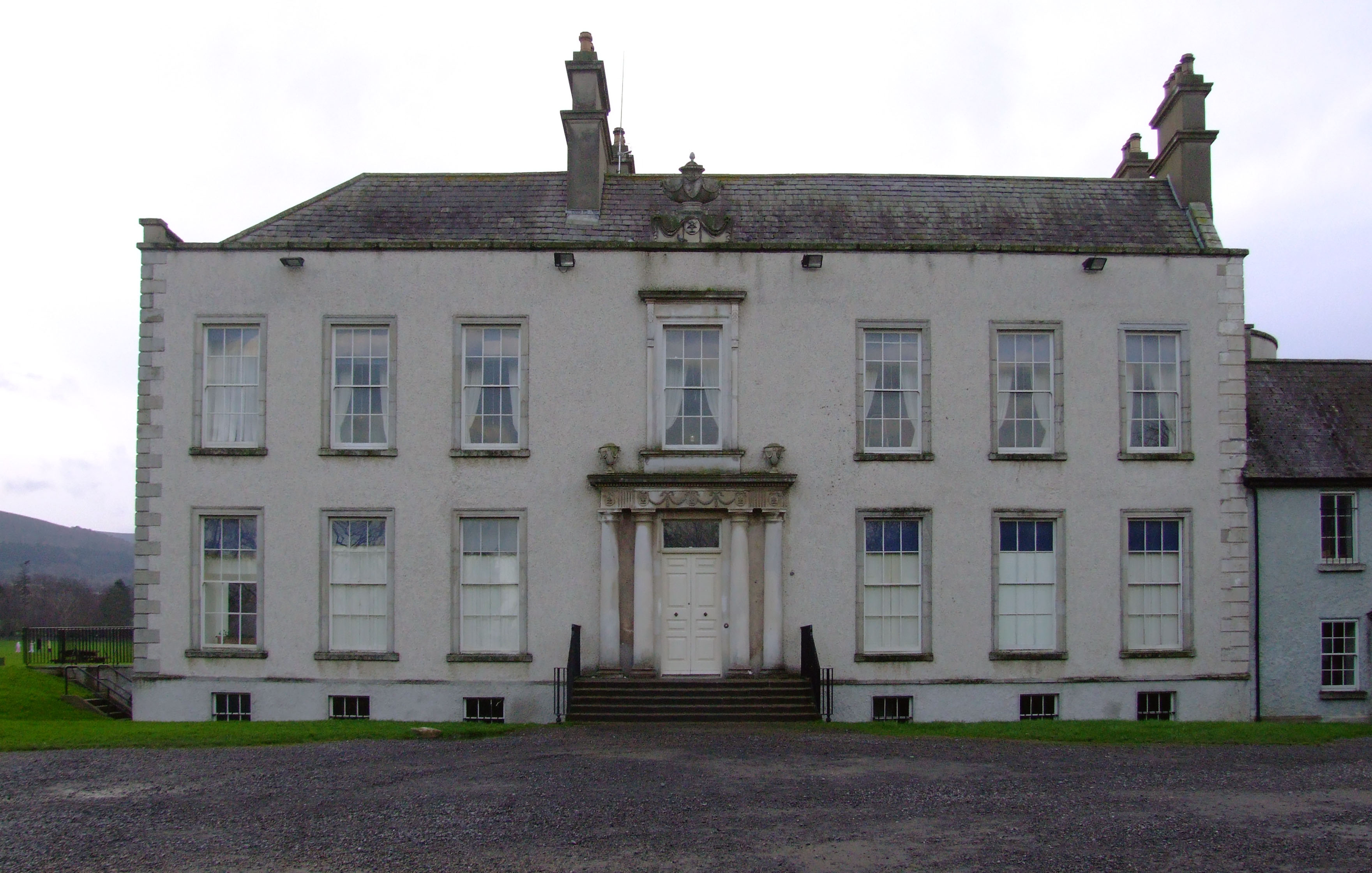
Marlay House in south Dublin, where Sir John's descendants lived.

== Sources ==
- Ball, F. Elrington The Judges in Ireland 1221–1921 London John Murray 1926
- Charleton, R.J. "A History of Newcastle-on-Tyne" Newcastle William H Robinson 1885
- Henning, B.D. ed. The History of Parliament: the House of Commons 1660–1690 Boydell and Brewer 1983
- Hepple, L.W. "A History of Northumberland and Newcastle Upon Tyne" Phillimore 1976
- Hodgson, J. "A History of Northumberland in Three Parts - Part I" Newcastle Thomas & James Pigg 1858
- Kenyon, J.P. The Stuarts Fontana edition 1966
- Wedgwood, C.V. The King's War William Collins Sons and Co. 1958
