= Customs House, South Shields =

Customs House
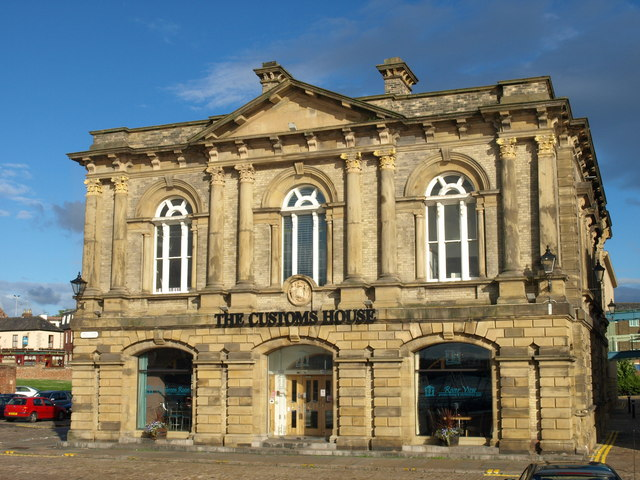
- The Italianate entrance to the Customs House facing northwest towards the River Tyne.

- Location in Tyne and Wear
- Location: Mill Dam, South Shields
- OS grid reference: NZ 35870 66858

History
- Built: 1863

Site notes
- Architect: T. M. Clemence
- Architectural style: Classical Italianate

Listed Building – Grade II
- Official name: Customs House
- Designated: 25 January 1978
- Reference no.: 1232273

The Customs House is an arts and entertainment venue in the Mill Dam Conservation Area of South Shields, South Tyneside. It opened in July 1864 as a custom house, built to facilitate the import and export of goods at Shields Harbour. Before 1865, both North Shields and South Shields operated as a single customs port following their separation from the Newcastle Customs House in 1848. South Shields was granted customs independence from North Shields in 1865, in part due to the construction of the new custom house building in the town. An extension was added to the building in 1878 to house the Marine Board offices. In the 1970s, the decline of the local shipping industry meant the custom house became derelict. In 1992, the Tyne and Wear Development Corporation led a restoration effort and extension of the building, transforming it into an arts centre.

The Customs House is a Grade II listed building, built out of sandstone and decorated with Heworth stone dressings, arches and pediments. It has been renovated to contain two theatres, art galleries, a restaurant and bar. In 2004, The nearby warehouses on Dalton Lane were refurbished and turned into offices, a rehearsal space and community room. The organisation is managed by the charity Customs House Trust Ltd.

== Architecture ==
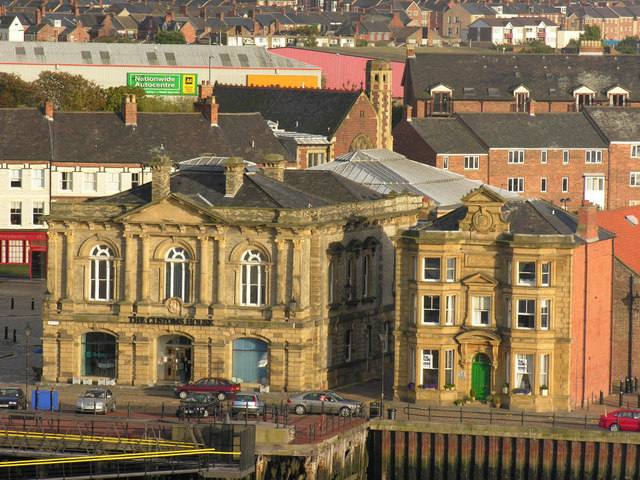
View of the Customs House on the River Tyne (left).

The Customs House is the main feature of the Mill Dam Conservation Area of South Shields and sits on the south bank of the River Tyne. The original building, built from 1863-1864, was designed by architect and surveyor of the borough T. M. Clemence. In 1878, an extension to the building was constructed, designed by J. H. Morton, which housed the local Marine Board offices.

The Customs House was built in a Classical Italianate style. It is characterised by white brick sandstone and Heworth stone dressings. It has two floors; the original ground floor entrance to the building sits behind three arches each supported by a pier. An additional smaller arch sits at each side of the entrance. On the first floor, above the arches, are three semi-circular windows. A triangular pediment sits at the top and centre of the building. The front of the building displays a coat of arms sculpted by Thos William. Around the side of the building are more windows framed by architraves and triangular pediments. The 1878 extension was built in the same style as the original construction.

Designated as a Grade II listed building on 25 January 1978, The Customs House is among four of such structures in the Mill Dam Conservation Area. In the 1990s, a further extension was added to the Customs House. It is in a different style to the main buildings from the 1800s, but does not detract from the overall architectural theme.

== History ==
=== Customs history ===
Before an independent custom house was established at the harbour of Shields, all vessels doing business on the Tyne had to be cleared at the Tyne Customs House on Newcastle Quay. Since 1815, shipowners at Shields had campaigned for a custom house to be stationed at the harbour, where a large amount of the River's industry took place. Applications for customs houses at both North and South Shields were continually turned down by the Treasury, in part due to pressure from the Newcastle Hostmen.

An application was finally successful in 1847. That year, a group of shipping merchants from North and South Shields petitioned the Treasury for an independent custom house to be situated in Shields. They argued that vessels had to travel an excessive distance along the river in order to conduct business at the Tyne Customs House, and that North and South Shields were being finically disadvantaged compared to other towns which had their own customs houses. They pointed towards the custom house branch which was already situated in North Shields. Although it not have the independence sought by the people of Shields, it represented a space in which customs activities could be exercised. The Board of Customs agreed that customs facilities could be established at North and South Shields. The North Shields custom house commenced operation in April 1848 and Shields Harbour formally became an independent Customs Port separated from Newcastle for the first time.

A photo of the front of the Customs House (left).

Following the separation between the Shields and Newcastle customs houses, focus moved towards a further split between North and South Shields. It became evident that North and South Shields did not conduct equal business; South Shields handled greater quantities of cargo than North Shields, (Note: In 1846 and 1847, North Shields imported no cargo at all.) stationed more vessels, and the south of the river was home to more industry including glass works and alkali manufacturing. Campaigners for an independent custom house in South Shields were faced with the reality that there was a lack of an adequate physical location from which to conduct business; an application made to the Treasury in 1862 was rejected solely on this basis. To allay concerns, construction began in 1863 of a custom house and office for the Marine Board in South Shields. The building was completed the following year with a total cost was approximately £3,000, (Note: Equivalent to £329556 today) and opened in July. The construction of the custom house was also indicative of the contemporary development throughout the local area. In 1865, another memo was sent to the Treasury setting out the case for an independent custom house. The Treasury agreed to the request, and South Shields custom house commenced operation on 1 October of that year.

An extension to the building was opened in December 1878 to house the local Marine Board offices. It was designed by J. H. Morton, cost approximately £2,400-2,500 (Note: Equivalent to roughly £252139 today) and consisted of additional frontage to the building, a court, waiting room, office and examination room.

=== Renovation into arts venue ===
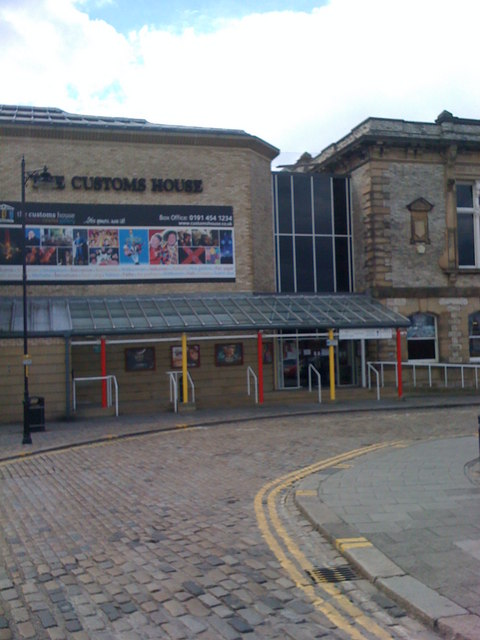
The modern entrance to the Customs House

In the 1970s, the custom house building became derelict due to the decline of the shipping industry. In 1979, a “for sale” notice was published in the Newcastle Journal for the freehold of the “Former Mercantile Marine Offices”. It stated that the successful purchaser would be responsible for restoration and described the space as suitable for “a wide range of uses … including commercial and entertainment”. Among the suggested potential functions for the building included a radar simulator for the South Shields Marine and Technical College. In 1992, the Tyne and Wear Development Corporation confirmed plans for the restoration and extension of the building as an arts centre, as well as providing £2.5 million of funding for the building and renovation work. The new organisation itself would be run by the local council, the Corporation, Northern Arts, and other local representatives.

The Customs House opened in November 1994 as an arts and entertainment venue with two theatres and art gallery facilities. As part of the restoration and funding, the Customs House assumed responsibility for local arts development. Tyne and Wear Development Corporation also bought a set of old workshops on Dalton Lane, refitting them as an office, rehearsal, community and storage space for the Customs House in 1994.

== Facilities and management ==
The building contains two theatres with 437 and 145 seats, art galleries, and a restaurant and bar. The nearby warehouses on Dalton Lane were refurbished in 2004 and became offices, a rehearsal space and community room. The main Customs House building and the warehouses are linked by a glass bridge. The theatre and restaurant were refurbished in 2016.

The Customs House is managed by the charity Customs House Trust Ltd. The current Executive Director of the Customs House, until March 2024, is Ray Spencer MBE.

== See also ==
- History of South Shields
