= Siege of Helmsley Castle =

Royalist stronghold besieged 1644

Coordinates: 54.2448°N 1.0643°W

- Part of First English Civil War
| Date | September to November 1644 |
| Location | Helmsley Castle, North Yorkshire |
| Result | Parliamentarian victory |

Belligerents
| Royalists | Parliamentarians |

Commanders and leaders
| Sir Jordan Crossland | Sir Thomas Fairfax |

Strength
| c. 200 | Unknown |
- Helmsley Castle in North Yorkshire

Helmsley Castle was a Royalist stronghold in North Yorkshire during the First English Civil War. It was besieged by Parliamentarian forces in September 1644 and surrendered on 22 November after a siege of two to three months.

== The military situation in Yorkshire in 1644 ==
The destruction of the Royalists' northern army at Marston Moor on 2 July 1644 meant that their strongholds in northern England, unprotected now by any field force, were vulnerable to being captured one by one. After the fall of York (16 July 1644), the Parliamentarian armies that had fought at Marston Moor went their separate ways. Lord Leven's Scottish army marched north to besiege the city of Newcastle. The army of the Eastern Association, under the Earl of Manchester, withdrew southwards, capturing Tickhill Castle (26 July) and Sheffield Castle (11 August) on the way. The Parliamentarian forces left in Yorkshire, under the command of Lord Fairfax, set about reducing the remaining Royalist garrisons in the county. They began with Helmsley Castle.

== The castle and its defences ==
The first castle on the site was built in the 1120s by the Norman baron Walter Espec. The site was of no great strategic importance and the castle was built there simply because it was the centre of Walter's estates. This first castle was a timber and earthwork castle. The first stone castle on the site was built in the late twelfth century by Robert de Roos, also known as Fursan. The castle was much added to over the centuries and at the time of the Civil War, the defences were reasonably well maintained compared to many medieval castles.

By the early seventeenth century, the castle was in the hands of the Manners family. On the death of Francis Manners, 6th Earl of Rutland in 1632, the castle passed to his daughter, Katherine Manners, widow of James I's favourite, the Duke of Buckingham. Through her the castle was to pass to their son, the second Duke.

The castle was built on an outcrop of rock on the north bank of the River Rye. The main ward, roughly rectangular in shape, was surrounded by high curtain walls with towers at the corners. The castle keep, known as the East Tower, lay about halfway along the east wall. The castle was surrounded by two deep, steep-sided ditches separated by a bank. The main gate to the castle was in the south-east corner of the curtain wall. This gate was protected by the massive Southern Barbican which stood on an enlarged section of the bank between the two ditches. Stretches of wall extended from the southern barbican across the inner ditch to join it to the main defences.There was a second, less important gate in the north wall of the castle and this was protected by a smaller barbican which also stood on the bank between the ditches.

== The opening of the siege ==
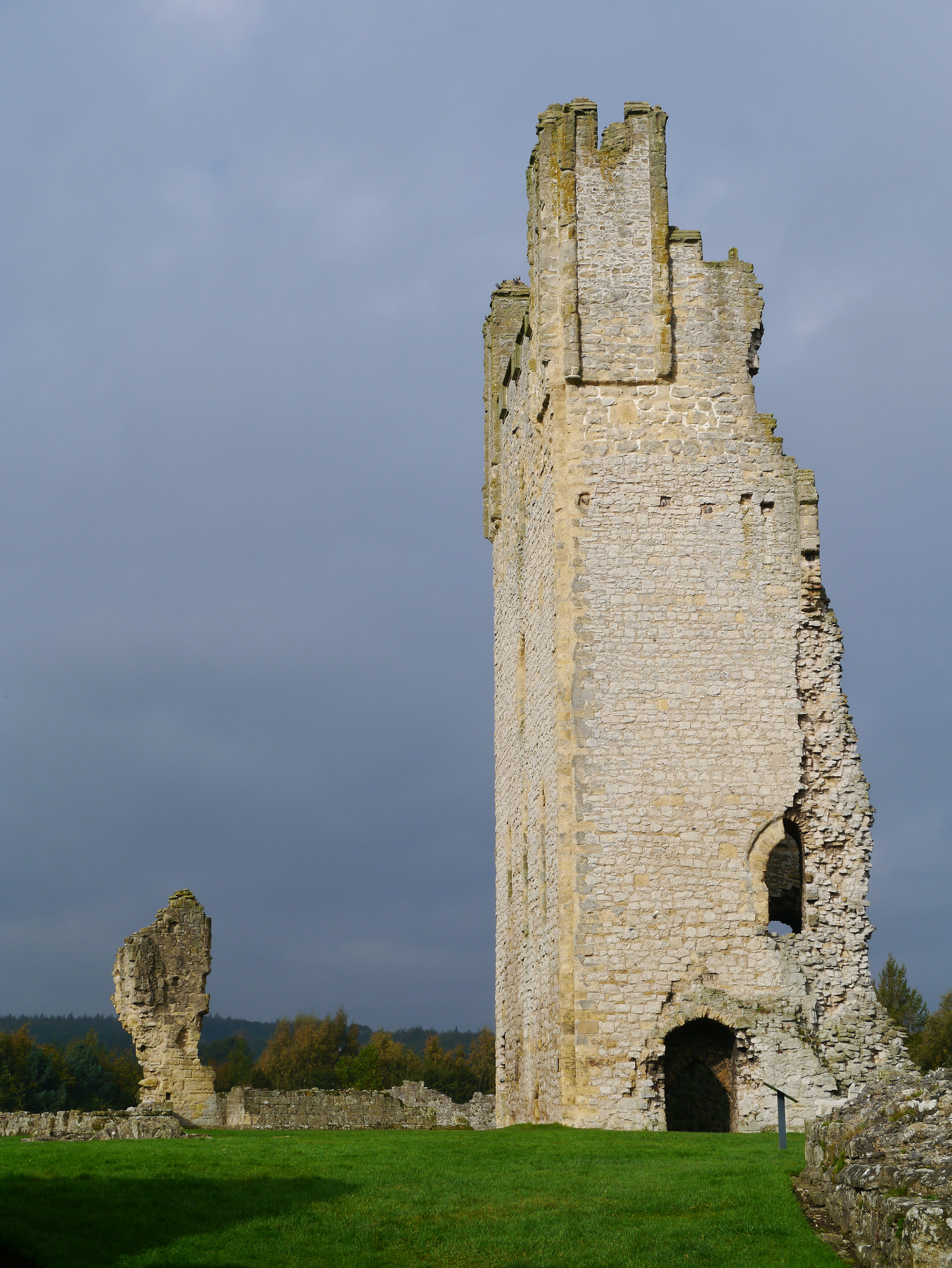
The East Tower at Helmsley showing the destruction inflicted after the end of the siege.

The siege began in September 1644. The Parliamentarian force was under the command of Sir Thomas Fairfax, Lord Fairfax's son. The Royalist garrison consisted of about 200 men under the command of Sir Jordan Crossland, a committed Royalist who was later to convert to Roman Catholicism.

Fairfax's plan seems to have been to reduce the castle by starvation rather than by assault or bombardment and there is little evidence for the use of artillery at Helmsley. The Parliamentarians certainly had artillery at the siege as we are told that the subsequent siege of Knaresborough could not start until the artillery had arrived from Helmsley. It may be that Fairfax lacked guns powerful enough to knock down Helmsley's walls.

The Royalists for their part mounted an active defence, conducting a number of sallies from the castle.

== The wounding of Sir Thomas Fairfax ==
Few details of the siege have been recorded but one of the more notable incidents was the wounding of Sir Thomas Fairfax. There are two versions of how this happened. In one version, Sir Thomas was leading a counterattack against a Royalist sortie when he received two wounds from musket shot which fractured his shoulder blade and broke his arm. In the other version, he was shot by a marksman from the castle keep while visiting the besiegers' lines. Sir Thomas in his own account gives no details of how the wound occurred, but he leaves no doubt of its severity: 'After this (i.e. Marston Moor and the surrender of York) I went to Helmsley to take in ye castle there, but received a dangerous shott in my shoulder and was brought back to Yorke; All for some time being doubtful of my Recovery.'

== Crossland's proposed articles of surrender ==
By the beginning of November, conditions in the castle were deteriorating and Crossland sent out to the Parliamentarian commanders a set of propositions for surrendering the castle. The propositions are summarised below.

The garrison would be allowed to march out with all the honours of war, i.e. "…with their arms loaded, matches lighted, colours flying, and drums beating", and safely convoyed to the Royalist stronghold of Scarborough.

Private goods belonging to the occupants of the castle, including those of the Duchess of Buckingham, were not to be plundered.

Prisoners taken by both sides were to be set at liberty.

Crossland also stipulated "That the Castle of Helmesley was to be absolutely demolished, and that no garrison hereafter be kept there by either party." It was unusual for the garrison of a besieged castle to insist on its demolition as part of the terms of surrender; this was normally a demand of the besieging force. Crossland presumably wanted to ensure the castle could not be held against the Royalists in the future.

The last article stipulated that both sides would wait until 16 November to see if the garrison would be relieved by Prince Rupert, failing which the articles would be implemented.

== The relief attempt ==
By this time a relief attempt was in the offing, though it is uncertain whether Crossland was aware of this when he proposed his articles. On 4 November, Sir John Mallory, commander of the Royalist garrison at Skipton Castle, sent a troop of horse to join up with a force from Knaresborough Castle and attempt the relief of Helmsley. On 12 November this force took the besiegers by surprise and scattered them, at least initially. However, the respite was only temporary as the Parliamentarians quickly rallied and drove off the relieving force inflicting a heavy loss in killed and captured. The parliamentary journal A Perfect Diurnal, gives the names of 9 officers and 44 men captured by the Parliamentarians in this action.

== The castle surrenders ==
The failure of the relief attempt left the garrison with no choice but to surrender. The terms originally proposed by Crossland on 6 November were now accepted by Colonel Francis Lascelles on behalf of Lord Fairfax. and on 22 November 1644, Crossland with his 100 remaining men quit the castle and marched off to join Sir Hugh Cholmley's force at Scarborough. On taking possession of the castle, the Parliamentarians acquired nine artillery pieces, 300 muskets and pikes and six barrels of gunpowder.

The Parliamentarians subsequently rendered the castle indefensible by demolishing sections of the curtain wall and blowing down the eastern wall of the keep.
