= Siege of Tiverton (1645) =

1645 siege

Coordinates: 50.9063°N 3.4885°W

- Part of Wars of the Three Kingdoms
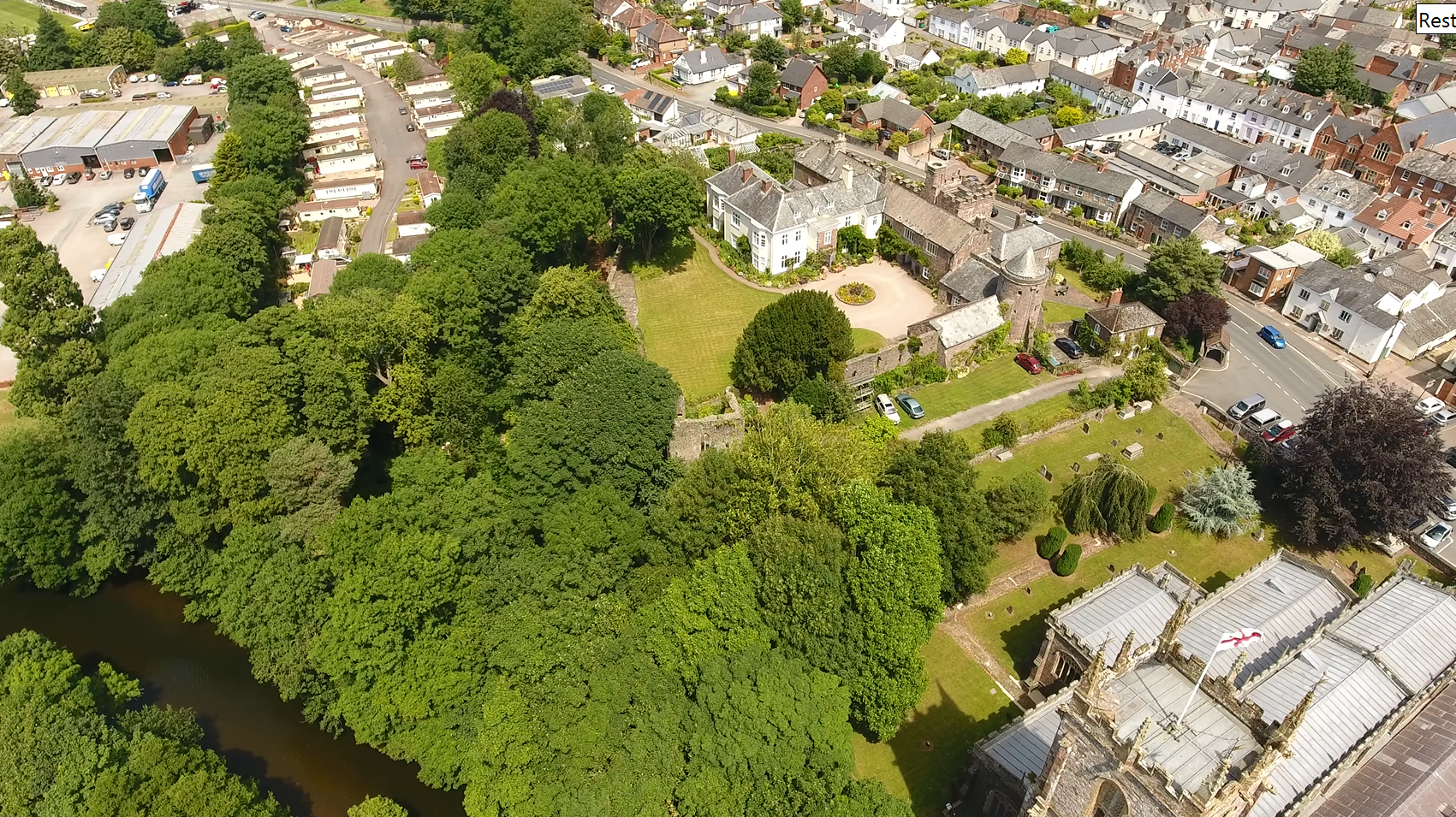
- Tiverton Castle, aerial view
Date	15 to 19 October 1645
Location	Tiverton, Devon
Result	Parliamentary victory

Belligerents
Royalists	(Kingdom of England) Parliamentarians

Commanders and leaders
Sir Gilbert Talbot; Major George Sadler	(Kingdom of England) Sir Thomas Fairfax (Kingdom of England) Edward Massey

Strength
200	2,000 – 4,000 (Note: The Royalist governor later claimed '22,000', but this is not possible, and there are few details available. The New Model was by now widely dispersed, and short of men)

Casualties and losses
200 POW	None

The siege of Tiverton took place in October 1645 during the First English Civil War, when a Royalist garrison surrendered to a detachment of the New Model Army.

Defeats at Naseby in June, and Langport in July destroyed the Royalist field armies, leaving them confined to parts of the West Country, and isolated strongpoints elsewhere. When Bristol surrendered on 10 September, their last significant position was the port of Exeter.

To isolate Exeter, the Parliamentarians first needed to capture outposts such as Tiverton Castle, held by a garrison of around 200. When their heavy artillery opened fire on 19 October, one of the first shots severed the drawbridge chains, and the garrison capitulated.

== Background ==
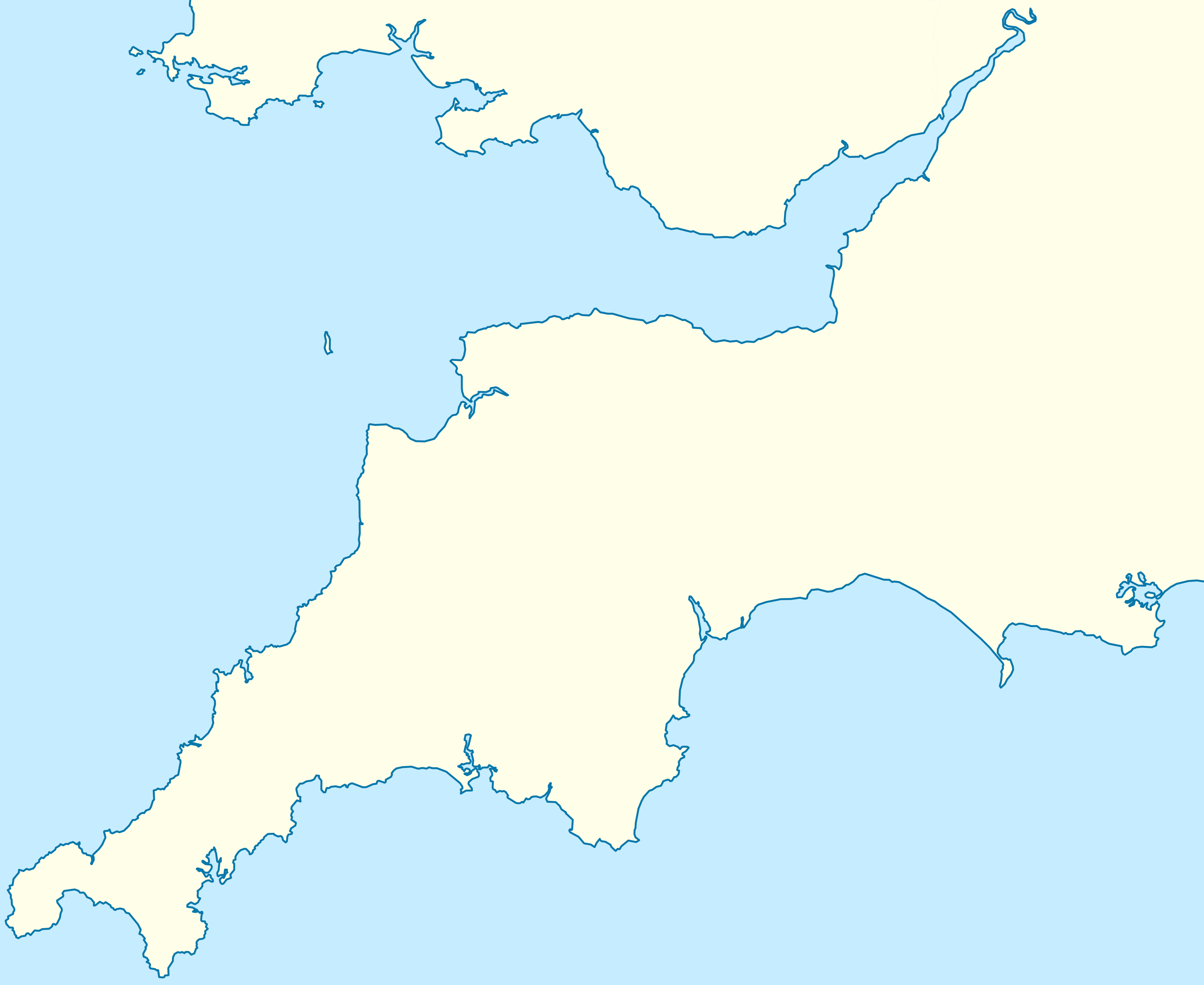
The 1645 campaign in the West

At the beginning of 1645, the Royalists still controlled most of the West Country, Wales, and counties along the English border. On 14 June, the New Model Army under Sir Thomas Fairfax won a decisive victory over Prince Rupert at Naseby. This left Lord Goring's Western Army as the last significant Royalist field force.

On 9 July, Fairfax forced Goring to end the blockade of Taunton, and destroyed the Western Army at Langport the next day. Before moving onto the Royalist-held port of Bristol, he first had to secure his rear. Large parts of the West Country were controlled by Clubmen, local militia groups set up to resist depredations from either side, which were often a greater threat than the Royalists.

Many Royalist fugitives from Langport were killed by Somerset clubmen, in retaliation for the damage caused during their occupation. Regardless of political allegiance, the main objective for these groups was to end the war, and Fairfax persuaded their leaders withholding support from the Royalists was the quickest way to achieve this. They agreed to remain neutral, in return for assurances Parliament would pay for any supplies they took.

However, in Dorset, these assurances had no effect, and after Fairfax arrested their leaders on 2 August, between 2,000 - 4,000 men assembled on Hambledon Hill, an ancient hill fort. On 4 August, they were dispersed by dragoons led by Oliver Cromwell; he managed to do so with minimal bloodshed, having made the point they could not stand up to the well-disciplined, professional New Model.

The surrender of Bristol on 10 September left Exeter as the last significant Royalist position in the West. At a Council of War held on 13th, Fairfax and his senior officers decided to clear any remaining Royalist strongholds between Plymouth and London, before moving on Exeter. Oliver Cromwell was tasked with taking those in Wiltshire and Hampshire, while Fairfax and Major-General Edward Massey did the same in Dorset and Devon.

== Siege ==
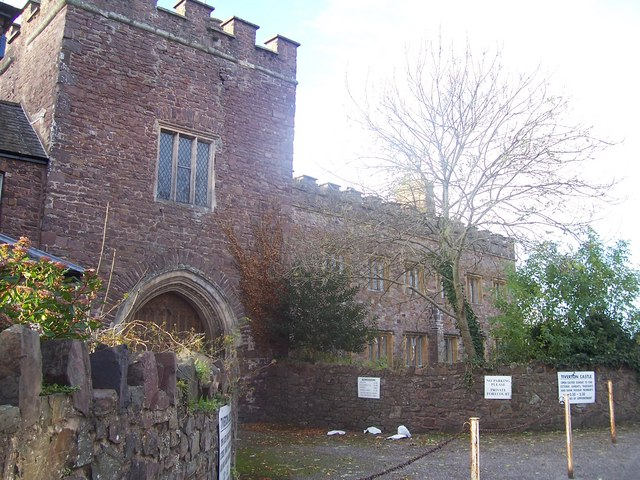
External view of the gatehouse, Tiverton Castle

Situated where the River Exe merges with the River Lowman, Tiverton controlled a key supply route into Exeter. Siege operations were delayed by lack of supplies; the retreating Royalists stripped the countryside bare, while the Parliamentarian forces were short of basic necessities, such as shoes for their horses.

Tiverton Castle had been held by the Royalists throughout the civil war, although the town itself was briefly occupied by the Earl of Essex in 1644. The castle had not been used since the beginning of the 16th century, and although strengthened since 1642, it could not sustain an extended siege. In October 1645, the Royalist garrison consisted of 200 men from Talbot's Regiment of Foot, originally recruited in Ireland, and transferred to England in 1643.

Its governor was Sir Gilbert Talbot, a diplomat who returned to England in January after 14 years in Venice. Although he had no military experience, his deputy was Major Sadler, a defector from the Parliamentarian army. His elder brother, Sharington Talbot, commanded the Royalist garrison at Lacock Abbey, Wiltshire, until replaced in early 1645.

On 15 October, cavalry from Massey's Western Association army arrived in Tiverton. The Royalists abandoned the town, but retained the castle, church, and attached graveyard. Massey's terms of surrender were refused by Talbot, and he had to wait until Fairfax came up with the main artillery train.

The lighter guns opened fire on Saturday 17 October, although it took two more days before positions were ready for the heavy artillery. At 7:00 am, Fairfax ordered parties forward ready to storm the walls; before starting, he again offered the garrison terms, which were rejected. One of the first shots severed the drawbridge chains, letting down the gate, and without waiting for orders, the Parliamentarian infantry crossed it. They quickly gained control of the graveyard and church, and Talbot surrendered.

== Aftermath ==
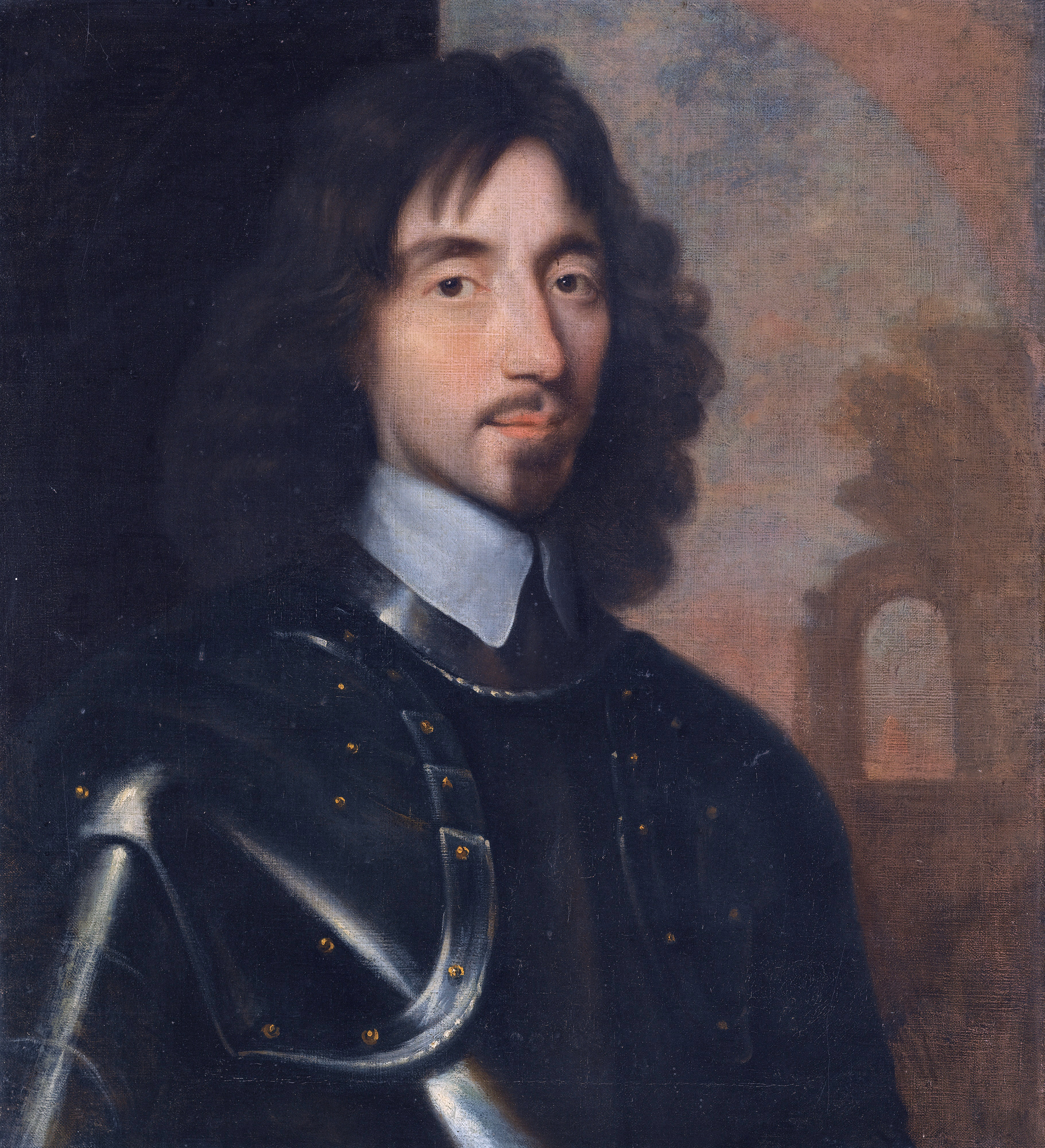
Sir Thomas Fairfax, commander of the New Model Army

The entire garrison was taken prisoner, most of the ordinary soldiers joining the New Model, while Sir Gilbert and other officers were exchanged for prisoners held by the Royalists. Prior to the siege, the Parliamentarian defector, Major George Sadler, unsuccessfully tried to negotiate a pardon, and was sent to Taunton to be tried for treason.

Although changing sides was not unusual in the early stages of the war, attitudes had hardened since then. Sadler claimed responsibility for delivering the castle to Parliament, but the court rejected this argument, and sentenced him to death. He escaped, and made his way to Exeter, preceded by news of his 'confession'; on arrival, he was executed by the Royalists.

Having established a blockade around Exeter, in November Fairfax set up headquarters at Ottery St Mary, but disease caused heavy mortality among his troops. In December, he pulled back to Tiverton, considered a healthier location, using Blundell's School as base. He remained there until early January 1646; before leaving, the castle defences were dismantled to prevent it being used again.

== Sources ==
- Bentinck, Arthur (1891). The manuscripts of His Grace the Duke of Portland, preserved at Welbeck Abbey. Eyre & Spottiswood.
- Carlton, Charles (1992). Going to the Wars: The Experience of the British Civil Wars 1638-1651. Routledge. ISBN 978-0415032827.
- "Colonel John Talbot's (Irish) Regiment of Foot". BCW Project.
- Creighton, Charles (1891). A History of Epidemics in Britain. Cambridge University Press.
- "Hambledon Hill". Castles, Forts, Battles.
- Hopper, Andrew (2012). Turncoats and Renegadoes: Changing Sides During the English Civil Wars. OUP. ISBN 978-0199575855.
- Manganiello, Stephen C (2004). The Concise Encyclopedia of the Revolutions and Wars of England, Scotland, and Ireland, 1639-1660. Scarecrow Press. ISBN 978-0810851009.
- Royle, Trevor (2004). Civil War: The War of the Three Kingdoms 1638-1660. Brown, Little. ISBN 978-0316861250.
- Rushworth, John (1722). The Proceedings of Fairfax's Army in 'Historical Collections of Private Passages of State, Volume VI, 1645-1647.
- Staab, John (2002). "Riotous or Revolutionary: The Clubmen during the English Civil Wars" (PDF). Early Modern Revolutions.
- Wedgwood, CV (1958). The King's War, 1641-1647 (2001 ed.). Penguin Classics. ISBN 978-0141390727.
