= Battle of Heptonstall =

Battle of the First English Civil War

Coordinates: 53°44′31.3″N 2°00′48.0″W

- Part of the First English Civil War
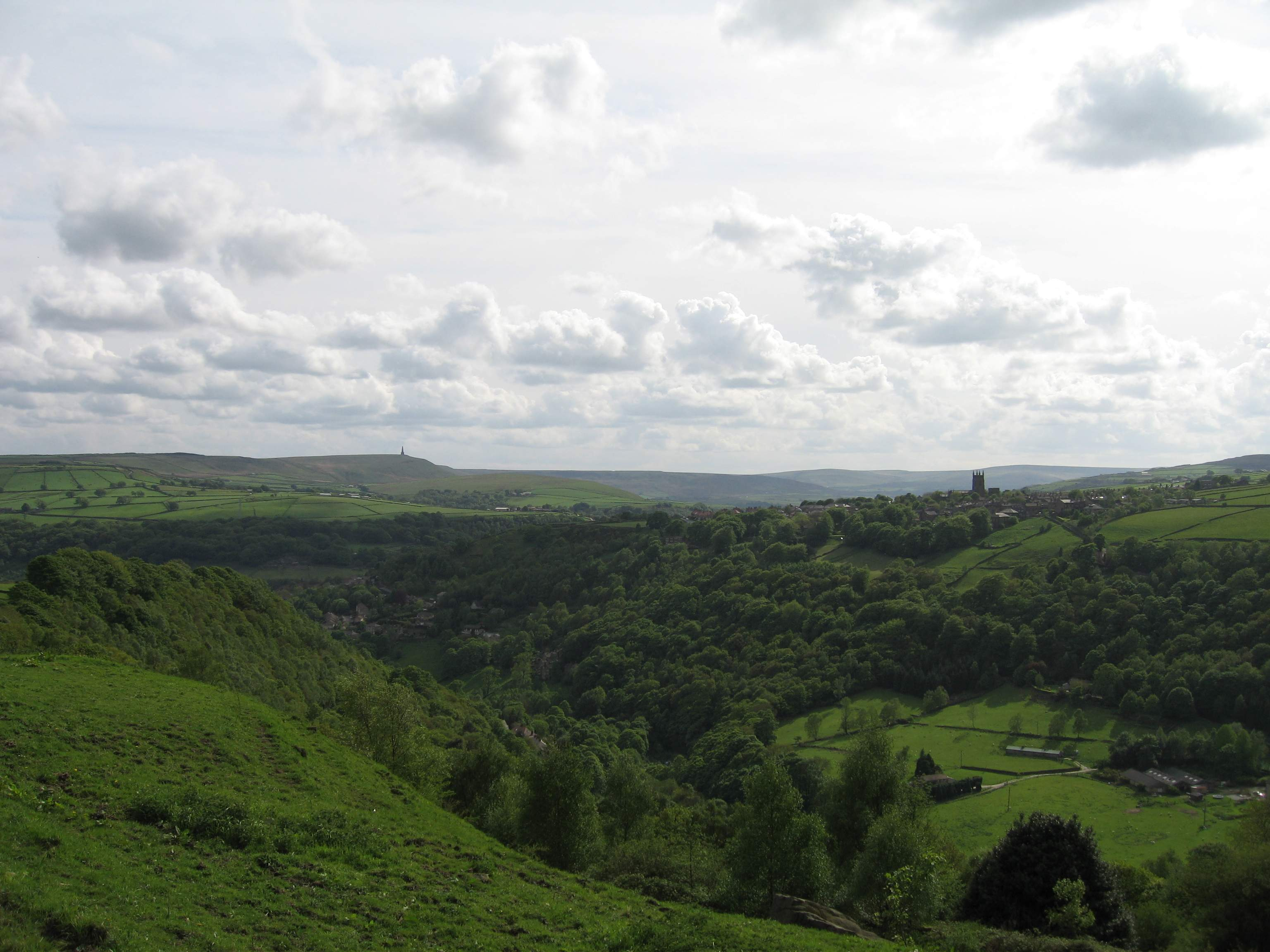
- The battlefield at Heptonstall
Date	November 1643
Location	Heptonstall, Yorkshire
Result	Parliamentarian victory

Belligerents
Royalists	Parliamentarians

Commanders and leaders
Sir Francis Mackworth	Colonel Bradshaw

Strength
800	800

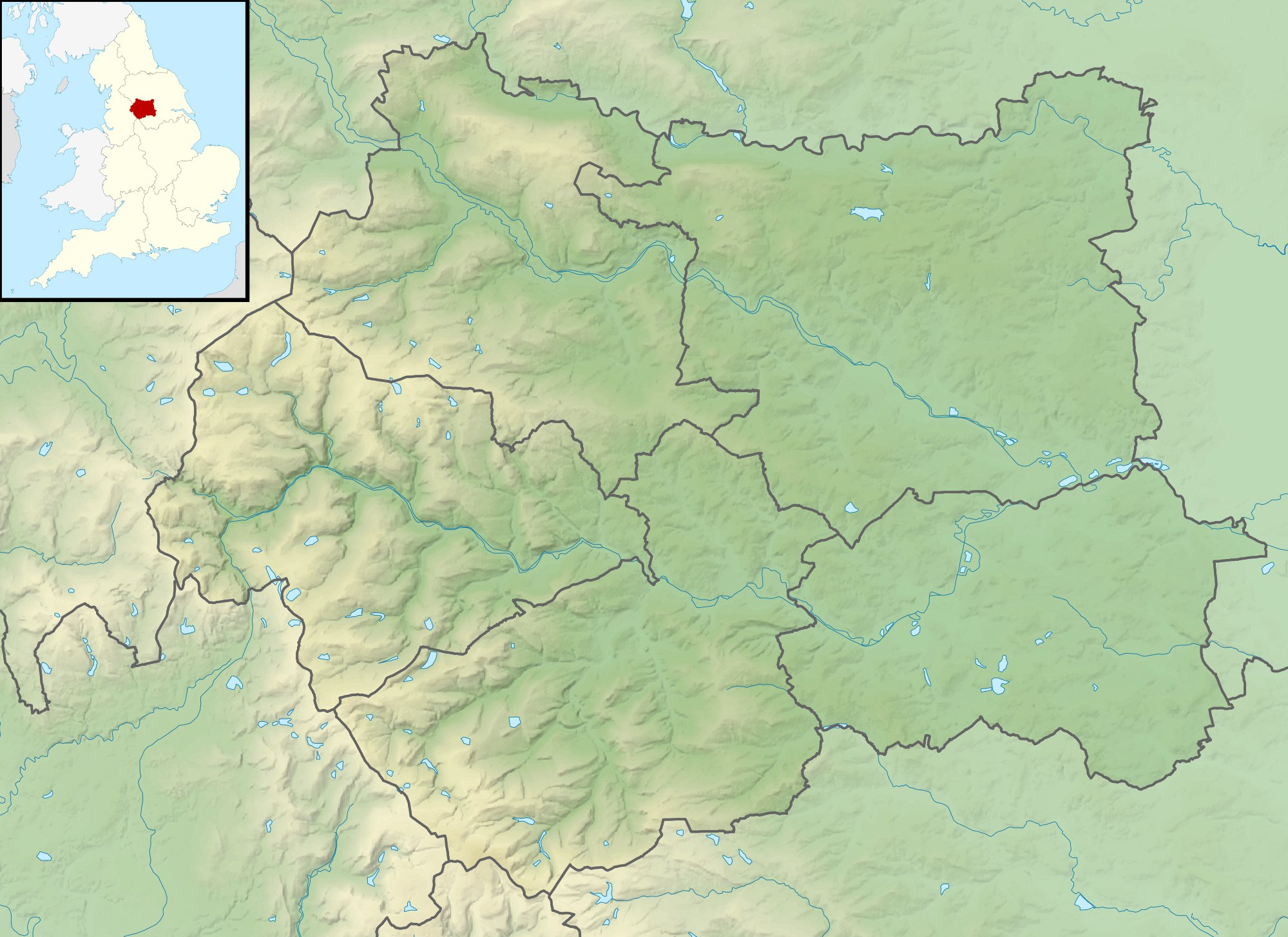
West Yorkshire and Heptonstall

The Battle of Heptonstall occurred in November 1643 during the First English Civil War at Hebden Bridge and Heptonstall, Yorkshire. During the battle, Colonel Bradshaw, a Parliamentarian commander fended off an attack by Sir Francis Mackworth and the Royalists.

== Background ==
By August 1643, the First English Civil War had been going on for a year. The north of England was predominantly under Royalist control after significant victories at the battles of Seacroft Moor and Adwalton Moor. However, the Royalists were embedded in a siege of Hull which they finally lifted in October without success, and were also defeated at Winceby in Lincolnshire, letting the Parliamentarians re-establish their presence in the north.

== Battle ==
The village of Heptonstall in Yorkshire (now West Yorkshire), 6.6 miles (10.6 km) west-northwest of Halifax, was held by a Parliamentarian force of around 800 men. It was situated atop a steep hill above Hebden Bridge. A Royalist army out of Halifax, numbering about the same, set out to attack the village under the command of Sir Francis Mackworth. It assembled at Hebden Bridge, a humpback bridge over the River Hebden, which at the time was a swollen torrent after heavy rain.

At the village of Heptonstall, the Parliamentarian garrison was commanded by Colonel Bradshaw, who knew the local terrain, and had set a number of traps which could be triggered if they came under attack. Using the advantage of the hill, he had placed several boulders above the winding track which led from the bridge up to the village. When lookouts posted in the church tower in Heptonstall saw the Royalists slowing climbing the 500-foot (150 m) hill, the rocks were released, and a volley of muskets fired. The attackers were routed, men were knocked off the ridged path, trampled by panicked horses and drowned in the violent river. Most of the remaining Royalists retreated, chased by the garrisoned army and "villagers armed with halberds and pitch-forks". The Parliamentarians chased the Royalists as far as Luddenden, roughly 3 miles (4.8 km) away and succeeded in capturing some of the attackers, initially locking them in the church, before moving them to Rochdale.

== Aftermath ==
During the subsequent months, the Parliamentarian garrison evacuated Heptonstall, moving to Burnley and Colne. As a result, the village was captured without resistance in January 1644 when Mackworth returned.
