= Babylon Hill =

Coordinates: 50.943721°N 2.594914°W

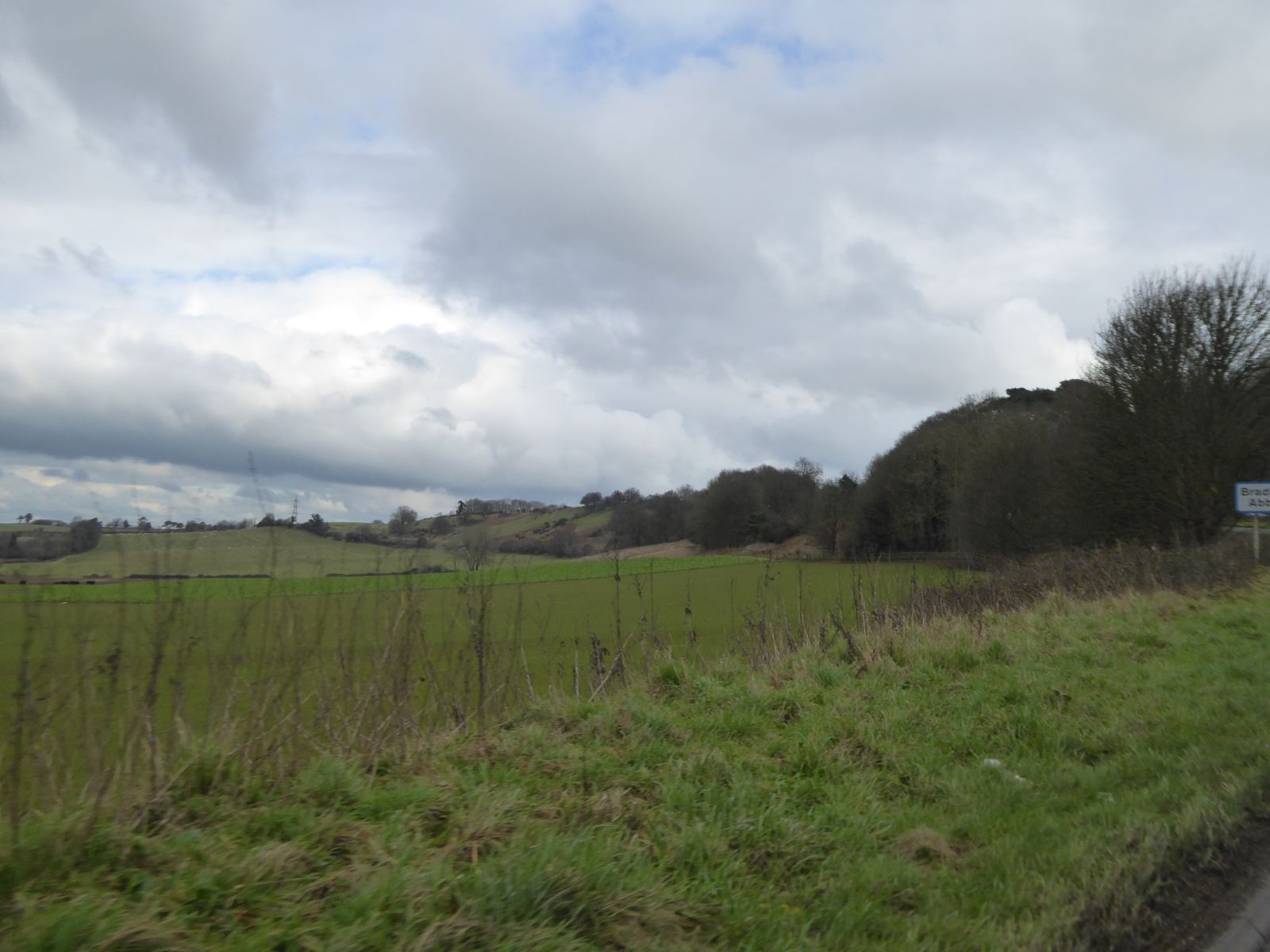
The north slope of Babylon Hill, on the A30

Babylon Hill (grid reference ST583162) in Dorset is a 2.2 hectare geological Site of Special Scientific Interest designated in 1977.

It was also the site of a minor skirmish, the Battle of Babylon Hill, during the English Civil War, which resulted in the Earl of Bedford's Roundheads forcing back Sir Ralph Hopton's Cavaliers to Sherborne.
