= Siege of Newcastle =

1644 battle of the First English Civil War

Coordinates: 54.972°N 1.608°W

- Part of the First English Civil War
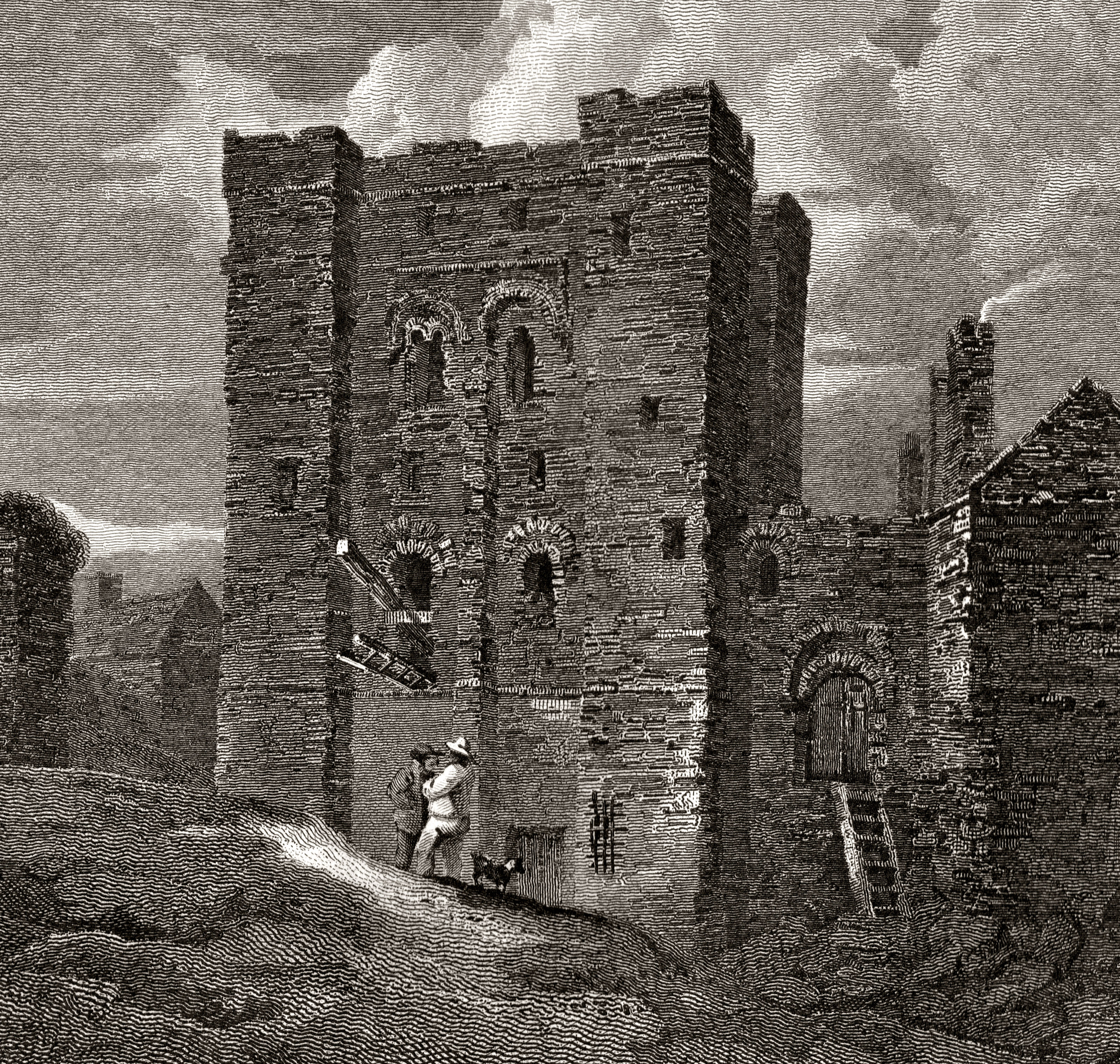
- Engraving of Newcastle Castle
Date	3 February – 27 October 1644 (8 months, 3 weeks and 3 days)
Location	Newcastle upon Tyne
Result	Scottish victory

Belligerents
Royalists	Covenanters

Commanders and leaders
Sir John Marlay (surrendered)	Earl of Leven; Earl of Callander

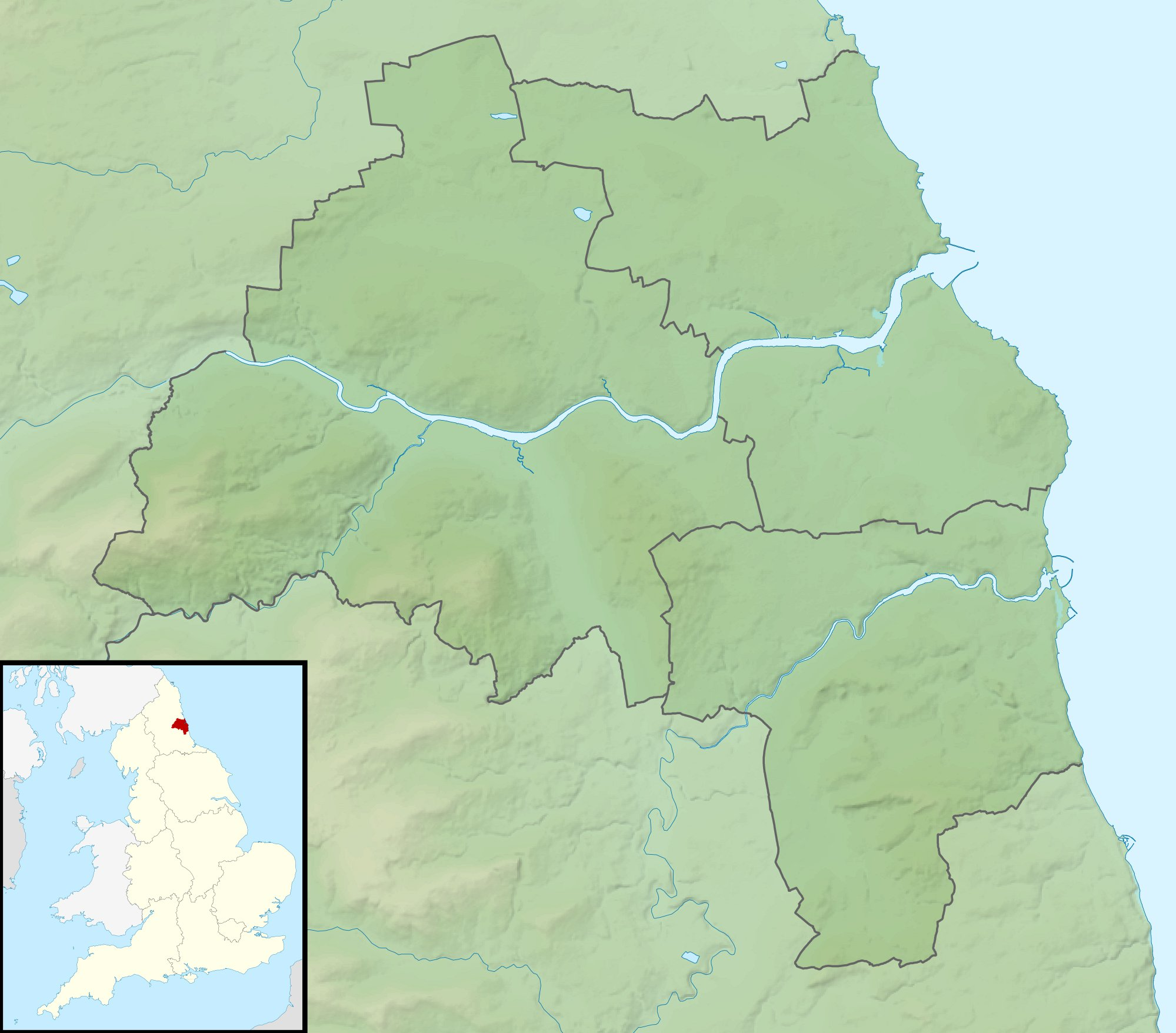
Tyne and Wear and Newcastle on the Tyne

The siege of Newcastle (3 February 1644 – 27 October 1644) occurred during the First English Civil War, when a Covenanter army under the command of Lord General Alexander Leslie, 1st Earl of Leven besieged the Royalist garrison under Sir John Marlay, the city's governor. Eventually, the Covenanters took the city of Newcastle upon Tyne by storm, and the Royalist garrison who still held castle keep surrendered on terms.

This was not the first time that Newcastle upon Tyne had changed hands during the Wars of the Three Kingdoms. The Scots had occupied the city during the Second Bishops’ War in 1640.

== Invasion and siege ==
A Covenanter army from Scotland under the command of Lord General Leslie crossed into England in January 1644. As Leslie moved his army south he left six regiments under the direction of Lieutenant General James Livingstone, 1st Earl of Callander, to lay siege to the city of Newcastle upon Tyne beginning 3 February (after the town was formally asked to surrender).

== Battle of Marston Moor ==
The city was not continually invested at that time. In a complicated situation, the Earl of Callander diverted his troops to take surrounding towns like Newburn, as the main Covenanter army pressed south. In the meantime, the royalist governor reinforced his position and also sent forces south where the Royalist and the main Covenanter-Parliamentarian allied armies clashed at the Battle of Marston Moor.

The defeat of the Royalist field army at Marston Moor on 2 July ultimately decided the fate of Newcastle and all the other Royalist strongholds in the North East of England as all such garrisons would be separated from any possibility of relief during a siege.

== Bombardment, storming and surrender ==
Beginning 15 August 1644, Newcastle and Tynemouth were again a target for Callander, now joined by the main Covenanters under Leven. Bombardment and mines were necessary to breach the walls. The western half of the city's wall fell on 19 October 1644. Those remaining loyal to the Royalist cause retreated into the Castle Keep. Finding the situation hopeless, surrender was negotiated with General Leslie by the Royalist Governor, Sir John Marlay on 27 October 1644. The terms of surrender were generous including the promise of mercy for the garrison, although some of the Royalist leaders, including Marlay himself, suffered imprisonment or banishment.

== Aftermath ==
The Covenanters were delighted at the result, more so it is thought than the English Parliament. Tynemouth had fallen on 27 October 1644 and the Scots were now able to control the Tyneside coal trade for a second time which they did until they were persuaded to leave on 30 January 1647 with the demise of the Solemn League and Covenant.
