= Battle of Babylon Hill =

1642 skirmish of the first English Civil War

Coordinates: 50°56′33″N 02°35′42″W

- Part of the First English Civil War
Date	7 September 1642
Location	Babylon Hill, near Yeovil
Result	Parliamentarian victory

Belligerents
Royalists	Parliamentarians

Commanders and leaders
Sir Ralph Hopton	Earl of Bedford (Note: Although the Earl of Bedford was quartered in Yeovil, and commanded the army there, he did not take part in the battle himself.)

Strength
c. 350	c. 350

Casualties and losses
estimated 15–60	estimated 3–16
- Location within Dorset

The battle of Babylon Hill was an indecisive skirmish that took place between Royalist and Parliamentarian forces near Yeovil, in South West England, on 7 September 1642, during the early stages of the First English Civil War. The engagement occurred after a failed Parliamentarian siege of nearby Royalist-held Sherborne. After the Parliamentarians had retreated to Yeovil, a force of around 350 Royalists was sent to reconnoitre their movements. Under the command of Sir Ralph Hopton, the Royalist detachment established itself on Babylon Hill, on the outskirts of Yeovil.

Around half an hour before sunset, the Royalists decided to withdraw and began marching their infantry off the hill. As they were doing so, they spotted Parliamentarian soldiers approaching, and Hopton hurriedly recalled the infantry and set his men to meet the attack. The battle became chaotic, mostly due to the inexperience of the soldiers involved. The Parliamentarian force, which also numbered around 350, made a three-pronged cavalry attack, which the Royalists were able to repel, though sections of both forces were routed. In the confusion, they were eventually able to pull back under the cover of darkness.

Neither side suffered heavy casualties; although both sides claimed they had killed sixty or more, a modern estimate suggests that the Royalists lost around twenty, and the Parliamentarians five. The Parliamentarians subsequently withdrew from Yeovil to Dorchester to the south, while around two weeks later the Royalists retreated from the area entirely.

== Background ==
Tension between Parliament and King Charles escalated sharply during 1642 after the King had attempted to arrest five members of Parliament. The King appointed the Marquess of Hertford as commander of his forces in the West Country, supported by Sir Ralph Hopton, a local member of Parliament (MP) and an experienced army officer. The county of Somerset was generally more sympathetic towards Parliament than towards the King, and after the Royalists established quarters at Wells they were constantly under threat. They won a minor skirmish at Marshall's Elm, where their superior cavalry and leadership helped them defeat a much larger Parliamentarian force, but they were forced to leave Wells on 6 August when the local population rose against them, wielding makeshift weapons such as pitchforks. Hertford retreated to Sherborne in Dorset, where he garrisoned the castle, with just under 1,500 men. Dorset was split in its sympathies: most of the larger towns favoured Parliament; but in more rural areas, and to the north of the county generally, the Royalists had more support.

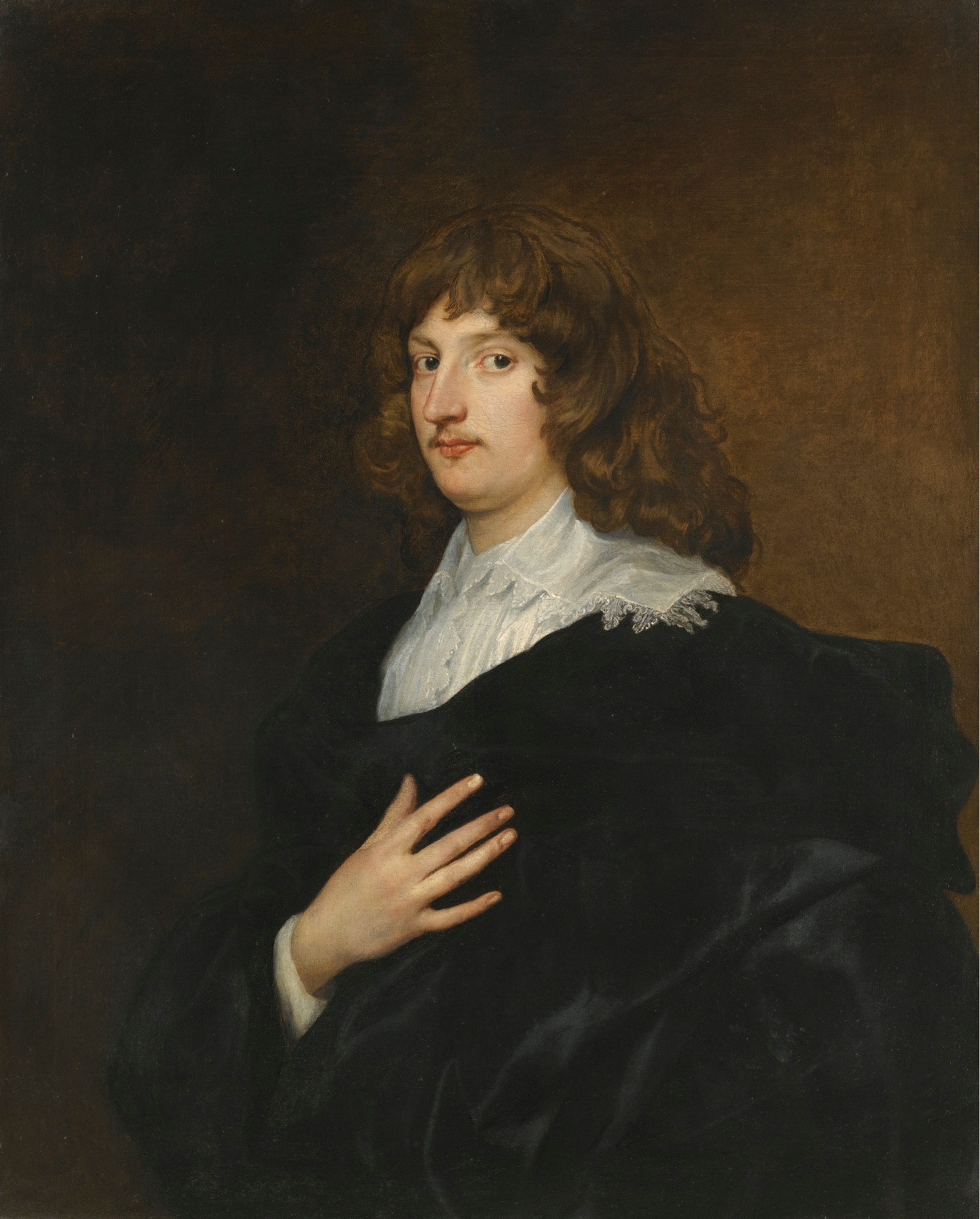
The Earl of Bedford commanded the Parliamentarian army in Sherborne and Yeovil.

A Parliamentarian army of between 3,500 and 7,000, led by William Russell, 5th Earl of Bedford, besieged Sherborne on 2 September 1642. On the first day, the Royalists had the better of several skirmishes in the town itself, but were unable to prevent the Parliamentarian bombardment of the town and castle. Hopton led his dragoons in small raids on the enemy camp each night, in conjunction with retaliatory artillery attacks on the besieging army. The inexperienced Parliamentarian army suffered from numerous desertions, culminating in a reported 800 on the night of 5/6 September. Bedford's army had dwindled to between 1,200 and 1,500, and he withdrew to Yeovil, chased by a small skirmishing detachment led by Hopton.

== Prelude ==
The day after the siege had been lifted, Hertford sent Hopton with around 350 men—150 horse (both cavalry and dragoons) and 200 foot soldiers—to scout the enemy's movements in Yeovil. On their approach to Yeovil, Hopton established himself on Babylon Hill, which he identified as a suitable location to watch the town, due to hedge-lined gullies which allowed his troops to climb the hill unobserved. Wary of attack, Hopton set musketeers and dragoons along the approaches to the summit, where he gathered his cavalry and remaining musketeers. Bedford had posted a guard, consisting of both infantry and artillery, on Yeovil Bridge, which spanned the River Yeo. Hopton's men had a good view of this guard and for over an hour his musketeers shot down at the guards with little effect.

== Battle ==
As evening approached, Hopton consulted with his commanders and decided to retire to Sherborne for the night, and at 6:00 pm, around half an hour before sunset, began withdrawing the infantry while the cavalry and dragoons covered the rear. Before all of the infantry had left Babylon Hill a Royalist officer, Colonel Lawdy, spotted an enemy party approaching over the fields by "a secret way". Rather than climb the hill via the gullies which Hopton had defended, the Parliamentarians cut straight through the fields, avoiding Hopton's ambushes. According to a Parliamentarian account of the battle, the Royalists had set "six musketeers on each side the way to entertain us, but they missed us all". In his memoirs of the war, Hopton states that he had twenty musketeers guarding the right-hand gully, and all of his dragoons hidden in the hedges on the left-hand gully.

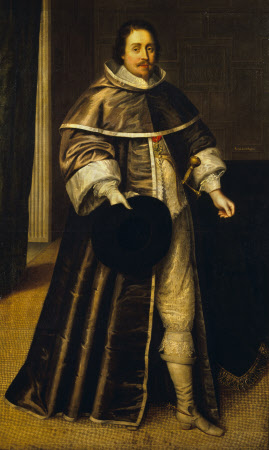
Sir Ralph Hopton led the Royalist forces at Babylon Hill.

Hopton summoned the infantry back, and brought his cavalry into battle formation to face the approaching Parliamentarians. The historian Richard Brooks described the ensuing fight as "more muddle than battle". Hopton sent two troops to charge the approaching Parliamentarians, the first led by Captain Edward Stowell, and the second (Hopton's troop) by Captain Henry Moreton. According to Hopton, Stowell was successful in routing the approaching enemy, but his inexperienced cavalry was outnumbered and themselves routed, their flight causing panic and retreat among Moreton's men as well. The Parliamentarian account of the battle said that the first of their three cavalry troops to reach the Royalists was commanded by Captain Aiscogh, and it "charged one of the troops through and through, and charged the second, but then was glad to wheel about". The account records that when Captain Tomson's cavalry reached the fighting things got chaotic, which concurs with Hopton's recollection that "in very short time, all the horse on both sides were in confusion."

Another group of Parliamentarians had made it to the top of the hill by going up one of the gullies on the right of Hopton's forces, which had been left unguarded after the musketeers had been recalled: Hopton blamed Sir Thomas Lunsford, who commanded the infantry for "having forgotten to put a party of musketeers as before". In total, the Parliamentarians committed a similar number, around 350 men, to the fight as the Royalists. In a letter written by the prominent Royalist, Sir Edward Nicholas, he described how on reaching the summit, the Parliamentarian captain—a son of William Balfour, Parliament's lieutenant-general of horse—"rode out single from his troop brandishing his sword, as if he would dare somebody to combat with him". John Stowell rode to meet the challenge, and after Balfour shot his pistol from a distance, Stowell held his fire until he was close enough to be accurate; he shot Balfour in the chest and finished him off with his sword. Hopton's description of the incident differs slightly, suggesting that another Royalist soldier, James Colborne, shot Balfour with a fowling piece, simultaneous to Stowell's lone charge. In either case, Balfour was disabled and his troop routed. Royalist reports claimed that Balfour had been killed in the fight, but the Parliamentarian dispatch does not mention him, saying only that "all but one of the slain are of Captain Aiscogh's troop". In his account of the battle, the historian Robert Morris suggests that Balfour was only stunned, and was active in later engagements that year. Seizing upon the confusion, Hopton chose to withdraw his infantry again, "covered by a few gentlemen", and in the darkness, the entire Royalist detachment was able to make good their retreat.

As the Royalists made their way off the hill, Hopton records that they came across around 16 of the Parliamentarians who had earlier been routed. His men killed a few of the soldiers, but most were taken prisoner, and escorted by the Royalists back to Sherborne. It is difficult to ascertain the losses for either side; Royalist propaganda claimed that they had killed between 100 and 140 while only losing 16 men, a figure which included one officer who was taken prisoner. In contrast, the Parliamentarians suggested that only three of their men had died, and that as many as 60 of Hopton's soldiers had been killed. In his history of Somerset during the civil war, David Underdown suggests that the Parliamentarians lost five, and the Royalists around twenty. Another historian, Tim Goodwin, provides higher estimates, quoting losses of 15 or 16 for the Parliamentarians, and 50 to 60 for the Royalists. Among the Royalist losses were two infantry officers; Lieutenant Hall and Captain Hussey, the latter of whom was said to have gone into the battle "clad in plush".

== Aftermath ==
As described by Hopton, the Earl of Bedford withdrew his army from Yeovil to Dorchester. The Royalist forces remained at Sherborne for almost two weeks after the battle, before learning that Portsmouth had been captured by the Parliamentarians. Hertford, against the advice of Hopton, decided to retreat to Minehead where they would escape by boat to Wales. The Royalists suffered heavy desertions during the long march through country predominantly sympathetic towards Parliament, during which they were chased by Bedford's army. At Minehead, they found that there were only two boats, and so Hertford sailed with the infantry and artillery to Wales, while Hopton and around 160 horse escaped through north Devon to Cornwall.

Both sides tried to claim victory in the propaganda war; on Parliament's side, a pamphlet entitled Happy newes from Sherborn said that "God cast upon the cavaliers a spirit of fearfulness, that they ran like mice into every hole." In contrast, Hopton said that after the battle "the enemy liked their bargain so ill, that they marched clear away from Yeovil". Brooks summarises the skirmish as "pretty much a draw", though he lists the Parliamentarians as winners, as does Stephen Manganiello in his encyclopedia of the war. The engagement was heartening to the Parliamentarians, showing that the Royalist cavalry could be beaten, and that their leaders were not infallible.
