= Battle of Boldon Hill =

1644 English Civil War battle

Coordinates: 54.946°N 1.430°W

- Part of the First English Civil War
Date	24 March 1644
Location	The Boldons, South Tyneside
Result	Indecisive

Belligerents
Royalists	Scottish Covenanters

Commanders and leaders
Marquess of Newcastle	Earl of Leven

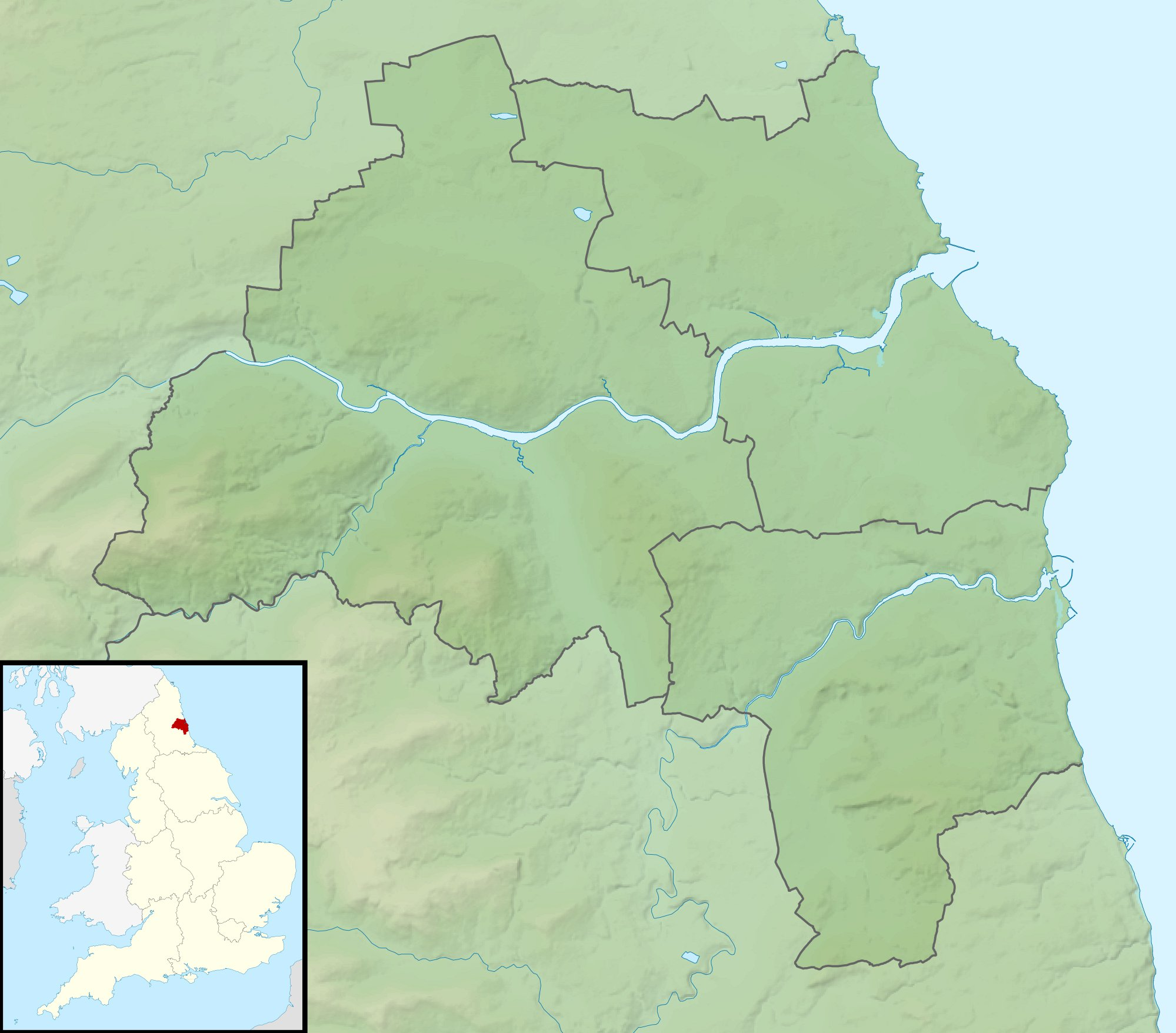
Tyne and Wear and Boldon Hill

The Battle of Boldon Hill was a day-long engagement that took place in modern-day Tyne and Wear between English Royalists and an army made up of Scottish Covenanters in alliance with Parliamentarians from nearby Sunderland on 24 March 1644 during the First English Civil War.

== Background ==
In 1643, the Parliamentarians made an overture to the Covenanters of Scotland for military assistance in the First English Civil War. On 29 November, the Covenanters and the Parliamentarians signed a military treaty in which the Scots would enter the war as an ally of the Parliamentarians and attack Royalist positions in northern England.

In January 1644, the Covenanters entered Northumberland with an army of 18,000 foot and 3,000 horse commanded by Alexander Leslie, 1st Earl of Leven. The immediate expectation on the part of the Parliamentarians was that the Covenanters would capture the strategic Royalist stronghold of Newcastle upon Tyne.

The town of Newcastle, however, was a medieval walled fortress complete with a “High Castle.” The Royalist garrison was only 500 men but the town had access to the North Sea and international trade including guns, ammunition, and grains. The Royalist forces in northern England and Newcastle were commanded by the Marquess of Newcastle and before the Scots approached he took refuge in Newcastle and reinforced the garrison with the addition of a Royalist force of 5,000 commanded by Colonel Sir Thomas Glemham.

== Before the battle ==
The Covenanter army began arriving in the vicinity of Newcastle on 2 February. Covenanter musketeers fired on the city forts from open fields and the Royalists responded with musket and cannon shots from inside the fortification. Nothing came of the initial exchange and the Covenanters backed away and retired for the night a mile from Newcastle.

On 3 February, Lord Leven attacked an outlying fort in Shieldfield and summoned Newcastle to surrender. Glemham, now serving as the governor of Newcastle, requested five days to consider the proposition and respond. Lord Leven granted the request as it would give him the time that he needed to bring up the siege guns and prepare for an assault.

As the full Covenanter army reached the vicinity of Newcastle over the next couple of days it had to be quartered all across the surrounding countryside. Time passed. Newcastle did not surrender and Lord Leven did not attack. Unwilling to simply sit in Newcastle and wait for an attack, the Royalists on 19 February sent thirty-five troops of horse out in an attempt to spring a surprise attack on their besiegers. The attack took place west of Newcastle at Corbridge. Although the attack was not a complete surprise, the Royals killed or captured over one hundred of the Scots.

The attack caused Lord Leven to take action. On 22 February, Leven ended the siege and began to move his army across the River Tyne south into Sunderland and toward Durham. At Newcastle, Leven left six regiments with Sir James Lumsden as a covering force. Meanwhile, the Royalist forces in Newcastle were reinforced with twelve troops of horse from Yorkshire commanded by Sir Charles Lucas. This brought the total number of Royalist forces at Newcastle to 14,000.

Given the increased size of the Royalist forces at Newcastle, the Marquess decided to pursue Lord Leven's army in an attempt to keep them from travelling further south and linking up with the Parliamentarians. As such, the Royalists left a force of 1,700 at Newcastle to defend against the regiments of Lumsden and followed the Covenanters to the vicinity of Boldon Hill where on 7 March they drew up in battle order two miles from the Scots. The Scots recognized the threat and responded by marching north and drawing up in battle order facing the Royalists. A clash, however, did not occur as the field between the two armies was impassable with many ditches and hedges between the two forces. So the two armies stood facing each other for several hours until the Royalists left the field at sunset.

The next day there was minor skirmishing between small parties of horse, however, the Royalists did not challenge the Scots as they had done the day before. Over the next couple of weeks the respective leaders of the two armies repositioned their forces. The Royalists travelled to Durham; linked up with additional reinforcements; and returned north to confront the Scots. The Covenanters travelled to the north side of the River Wear at Sunderland; added provisions as they could; and then attacked and captured the Royalist fort at South Shields near the mouth of the River Tyne east of Newcastle.

== Battle of Boldon Hill ==
On about 22 March, the two armies became aware of each other's respective positions and initiated the preparations for another confrontation. Over next two days the two armies retook positions near where they had faced each other earlier in the month. The Royalists were again atop Boldon Hill while the Scots positioned themselves at Whitburn Lizard (Cleadon Hills) three miles away.

On Sunday 24 March, the battle began when the Royalists advanced toward the Scots at “Sermon time.” The Royalist musketeers took positions at hedges and stopped as the field between them and the Scots was impassable as before. The Covenanters responded with their musketeers taking positions and returning fire from the hedges on their end of the field. Cannon fire from both armies then commenced and continued without stop. In the afternoon, Scot dragoons attacked Royalist musketeers in East Boldon but otherwise the cannon duel which continued until midnight became the primary means of exchange during the battle. Eventually the Royalists retreated back to Boldon Hill and the Scots retired back to Whitburn Lizard.

The exchange of musket and cannon fire in this battle was ultimately hampered by the terrain and was largely ineffective. Both sides claimed victory. The actual number of casualties is unknown; the Royalists admitted to a loss of 240 men.

== Aftermath ==
After the battle, the Royalist army withdrew to Durham in route to York. Five days later the Covenanters followed the Royalist south.

The two armies would meet again at the Siege of York in April and at the Battle of Marston Moor in July. After the Parliamentarian victory at Marston Moor, Leven and the Covenanters would return to Newcastle where on 15 August the siege of Newcastle would resume in earnest ultimately resulting in the formal surrender of the fortress on 27 October 1644.
