= Michael Biddulph =

Michael Biddulph may refer to:

- Michael Biddulph (died 1666) (1610–1666), member of parliament for Lichfield (1660–1661)
- Sir Michael Biddulph, 2nd Baronet (c. 1652–1718), English member of parliament for Lichfield five times
- Michael Biddulph (elder) (fl.1640s), MP for Licfield
- Michael Biddulph (1661–1697), member of parliament for Tamworth
- Sir Michael Biddulph (British Army officer) (1823–1904), British general officer and Gentleman Usher of the Black Rod
- Michael Biddulph, 1st Baron Biddulph (1834–1923), English politician, member of parliament in Herefordshire

== See also ==
- Biddulph (disambiguation)
