= Adrian Scrope =

English Parliamentarian soldier

Colonel Adrian Scrope
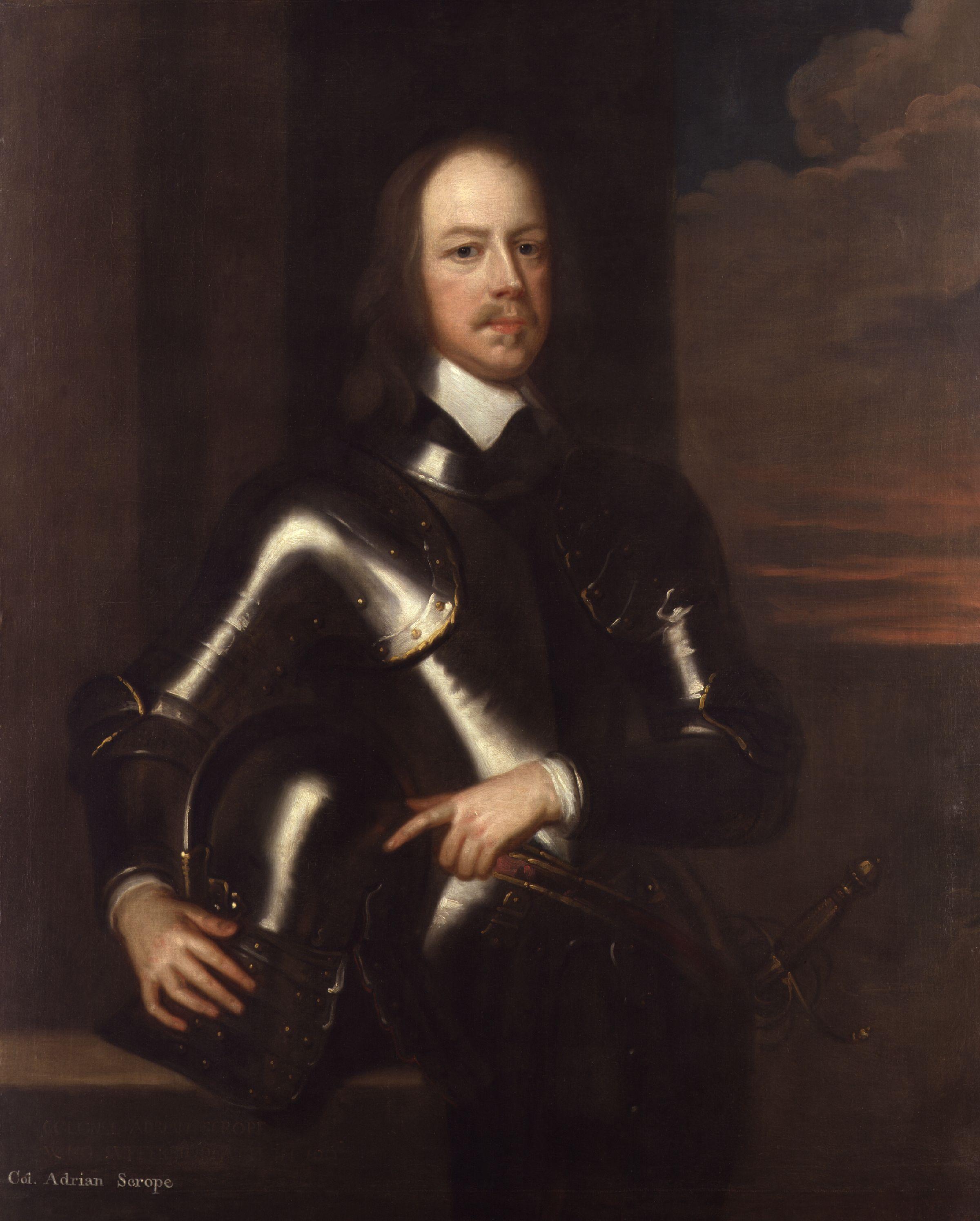
- Adrian Scrope by John Faber the Younger, circa 1719

Council of Scotland
- In office 1655–1658

Governor of Bristol Castle
- In office 1649–1655

Personal details
- Born: 12 January 1601 Wormsley Park, Buckinghamshire
- Died: 17 October 1660 (aged 59) Charing Cross, London
- Party: Parliamentarian
- Spouse: Mary Waller (married 1624)
- Children: 5
- Education: Hart Hall, Oxford
- Occupation: Soldier and administrator

Military service
- Allegiance: Parliamentarian; Commonwealth
- Years of service: 1642–1649
- Rank: Colonel
- Battles/wars: War of the Three Kingdoms; Battle of Edgehill; Battle of Lostwithiel; Second Battle of Newbury; Sieges of Taunton; Battle of Langport; Siege Bristol; Siege of Oxford; Siege of Colchester; Battle of St Neots

Colonel Adrian Scrope (also spelt Scroope; 12 January 1601 — 17 October 1660) was a Parliamentarian soldier during the Wars of the Three Kingdoms, and one of those who signed the death warrant for Charles I in January 1649. Despite being promised immunity after the Restoration in 1660, he was condemned as a regicide and executed in October.

A wealthy landowner from Buckinghamshire, Scrope was a relative of the Parliamentarian leader John Hampden and fought in both the First and Second English Civil Wars. Appointed by Oliver Cromwell as head of security during the trial of Charles I, he was present on each day and signed the death warrant. However, he largely avoided taking part in the political struggles of the Protectorate or the Restoration of Charles II.

Initially released in June 1660 after paying a fine, he was re-arrested in August, tried for treason and found guilty, primarily due to a claim he refused to condemn the execution of Charles I, even after the Restoration. He was executed at Charing Cross, London, on 17 October 1660.

== Personal details ==
Adrian Scrope was born at Wormsley Park, Buckinghamshire and baptised on 12 January 1601, only son of Sir Robert Scrope (1569-1630) and Margaret Cornwall (1573-1633). The family were a cadet branch of the Scropes of Bolton.

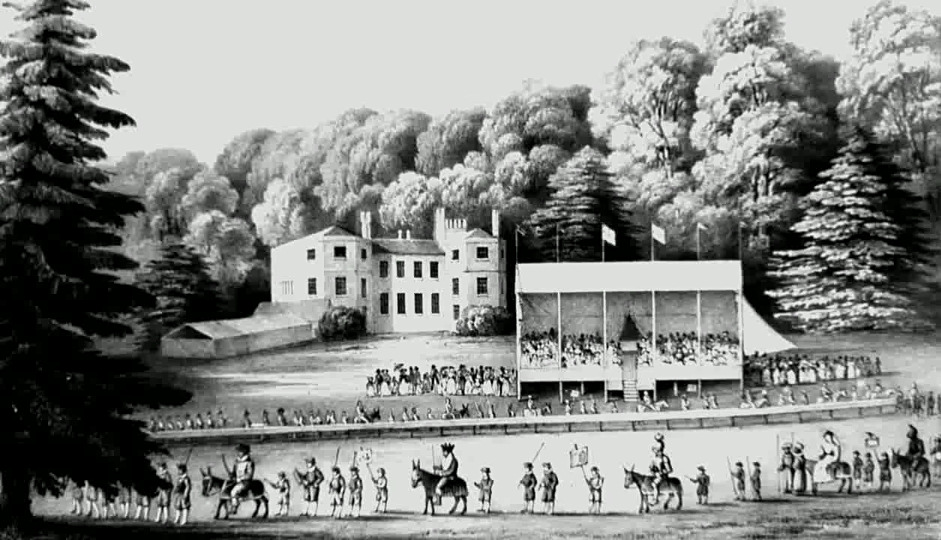
Wormsley Park, circa 1840; house in background

In 1624, he married Mary Waller, sister of the poet and Royalist conspirator Edmund Waller. They had at least eight children, and probably more: Edmund (1626-1658); Robert (1628-bef. 1661); Margaret (1) (b. ca. 1630-1631; d. bef. 6 Feb 1639/40); Anne (bp. 3 June 1633); Thomas (bp. 11 Sep 1634; d. bef. Will probate 1 Aug 1704), heir of Wormsley estate; Mary (bp. 28 June 1636); Margaret (2) (bp. 6 Feb 1639/40) and Elizabeth (b. 1655; bur. 4 Aug 1738). The fact that his youngest daughter Elizabeth is not mentioned in Pedigrees, coupled with the nearly 15 year gap between the births of Margaret (2) and Elizabeth, suggests that there may have been additional children. William Scrope (Throop)1638-1704- Sc

His youngest daughter Elizabeth married Jonathan Blagrave (1652-1698), who was a Prebendary of Worcester Cathedral and related to another regicide, Daniel Blagrave. On her death in 1738, she was buried in St Mary's Collegiate Church, Youghal where her memorial can still be seen. It names her father as "Colonel Adrian Scrope, of Warmesley in the County of Oxford"; as with many of those which refer to the regicides, it was deliberately defaced and broken in two at some point.

== Career ==
Scrope graduated from Hart Hall, Oxford on 7 November 1617, and as was then common studied law at the Middle Temple until 1619. There are few details of his career prior to the outbreak of the First English Civil War in August 1642; he was related to the Parliamentarian leader John Hampden and like many of the Buckinghamshire gentry joined the army of Parliament, raising a troop of horse for the Earl of Essex and fighting at Edgehill.

In 1644, he joined Sir Robert Pye's cavalry regiment, fighting at Lostwithiel and the Second Battle of Newbury, before transferring to the New Model Army in 1645 as a major in Colonel Richard Graves' regiment. Although the regiment was part of the force sent to relieve Taunton and missed the Battle of Naseby, he took part in the South-Western campaign, where it fought at Langport and Bristol.

Just before the Royalist capital of Oxford surrendered in June 1646, Charles I escaped to join the Scottish Covenanter army outside Newark. In March 1647, the Scots handed him over to Parliament in return for £400,000 and Graves' regiment escorted him to Holdenby House in Northamptonshire. In the struggle for control between Parliamentary moderates and the Army Council, Graves supported Parliament; when Cornet George Joyce arrived at Holmby and took charge of the king on behalf of the Council, Scrope replaced Graves as colonel.

Key locations; 1642 to 1648

By early 1648, Scrope was based in Blandford keeping order in Dorset, home base of Denzil Holles, the Army's leading Parliamentary opponent, before an alliance of English and Scots Royalists and Presbyterians led to the Second English Civil War in June. Scrope was sent to help Thomas Fairfax suppress the revolt in Kent and Essex, before being detached from the Siege of Colchester to put down another rising in Cambridgeshire, led by Henry Rich, 1st Earl of Holland. On 10 July, he took Holland prisoner at the Battle of St Neots; although Parliament voted for banishment, the Army insisted on his execution in March 1649.

Just before the Second Civil War ended, Scrope was sent to Yarmouth after reports the Prince of Wales was attempting to land there. Although this did not take place, it is suggested Yarmouth was the location of a meeting held around this time where Oliver Cromwell proposed the trial and execution of Charles I. It is not clear whether Scrope attended but shortly afterwards he became a member of the Army Council; he supported Pride's Purge in December 1648, was appointed one of the judges at trial of Charles I, and voted for his execution on 30 January 1649.

In April 1649, continuing unrest within the army led to a series of mutinies. Then based at Salisbury, in May Scrope's regiment was selected to take part in the reconquest of Ireland; joined by Henry Ireton's unit, they refused to go. Only eighty men remained loyal to Scrope, the rest elected new officers, fortified their positions within the town, and published a pamphlet with their demands. The units from Salisbury attempted to link up with colleagues elsewhere, posing a serious threat to the regime; Cromwell and Fairfax put down the mutiny at Burford on 17 May, three ringleaders were shot and the regiments concerned dissolved, including Scrope's.

His inability to pacify the mutineers and general unpopularity with the troops ended Scrope's active military career. In October, he was appointed governor of Bristol Castle, a position he retained until June 1655 when it was demolished as part of a scheme for reducing the number of garrisons in England. In August, he was appointed to the newly formed Council of Scotland, a body established by Cromwell to administer the country following its incorporation into the Commonwealth. Edmund Ludlow, another regicide who became an opponent of Cromwell, claimed this was to offset George Monck, the ambitious military commander.

== Execution ==
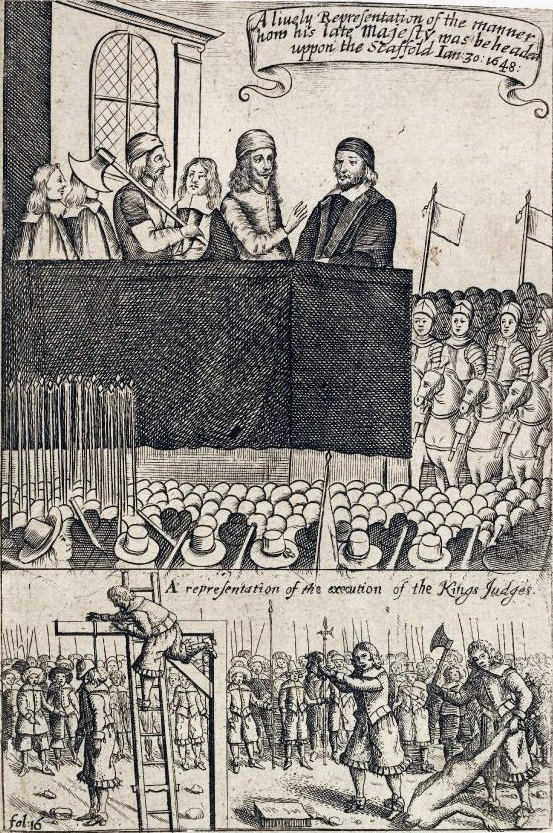
Contemporary print; execution of Charles I (top) and the regicides (bottom)

Scrope spent little time in Scotland and played no part in the struggle for power that ended with The Restoration of Charles II in May 1660. He complied with the proclamation issued by Charles II on 4 June 1660, requiring the regicides to surrender within fourteen days "upon pain of being excepted from pardon". After a lengthy debate, on 9 June the Commons ruled he be discharged after paying a fine, a considerably lighter sentence than that imposed on the other prisoners.

However, on 23 July the Lords passed a motion excluding him from the Indemnity and Oblivion Act along with all the regicides; Scrope was clearly viewed with some sympathy, as on 1 August the High Sheriff of Oxfordshire was summoned to explain why he had failed to arrest him. What sealed his fate was the allegation by Sir Richard Browne, a Parliamentarian moderate excluded in 1648 and now MP for the City of London, that in a recent conversation Scrope refused to denounce the execution. As a result, on 28 August the Commons agreed to put him on trial.

At the proceedings on 12 October, Scrope claimed he acted as instructed by Parliament but admitted to an 'error of judgement'. While the presiding judge, Sir Orlando Bridgeman, agreed he was "not such a person as some of the rest", Browne's evidence meant he was condemned to death. On 17 October, he was hanged, drawn and quartered at Charing Cross, along with Thomas Scot, Gregory Clement and John Jones Maesygarnedd; as a special favour, his body was returned to his family for burial, rather than being put on display.

== Sources ==
- A Proclamation. "By the King. A Proclamation To summon the Persons therein named, who sate, gave Judgment, and assisted in that horrid and detestable Murder of his Majesties Royal father of blessed memory, to appear and render themselves within Fourteen days, under pain of being excepted from Pardon". Christies.
- Anonymous (1649). The RESOLUTIONS of the Private Souldiery of Col. Scroops Regiment of Horse (now quartering at and neer unto Salisbury) concerning their present Expediti∣on for the Service of IRELAND. TCP.
- Foster, Joseph (1874). Pedigrees of the County Families of Yorkshire, V. 3. London, The Compiler.
- Groeger, Kieran (30 October 2019). "The Peculiar Grave of Elizabeth Scrope". Youghal Celebrates History.
- House of Commons (1802). Journal of the House of Commons: Volume 8, 1660–1667. HMSO.
- House of Lords (1767). Journal of the House of Lords, Volume 11, 1660-1666. HMSO.
- Lea, R. S. (1970). Sedgwick, Romney (ed.). SCROPE, John (c. 1662–1752), of Wormsley, in Stokenchurch, Bucks in The History of Parliament: the House of Commons 1715–1754. Boydell & Brewer.
- Ludlow, Edmund (1894). Firth, Charles Harding (ed.). The Memoirs of Edmond Ludlow, Lieutenant-General of the Horse in the Army of the Commonwealth of England, 1625–1672; Volume I. Clarendon Press.
- Noble, Reverend Mark (1798). The Lives of the English Regicides, Volume II. John Stockdale.
- Norfolk Archives. "Key dates in Great Yarmouth's history". Norfolk Archives.
- Pepys, Samuel (28 August 2003). "Tuesday 28 August 1660". The Diary of Samuel Pepys.
- Plant, David. "Adrian Scrope". BCW Project.
- Royle, Trevor (2004). Civil War: The Wars of the Three Kingdoms 1638–1660. Abacus. ISBN 978-0-349-11564-1.
- Smut, R Malcolm (2004). "Rich, Henry, first earl of Holland (1598–1649)". Oxford Dictionary of National Biography (online ed.). Oxford University Press. doi:10.1093/ref:odnb/23484. (Subscription, Wikipedia Library access or UK public library membership required.)
- Wroughton, John (2008). "Scrope, Adrian (1601–1660)". Oxford Dictionary of National Biography (online ed.). Oxford University Press. doi:10.1093/ref:odnb/24952. (Subscription, Wikipedia Library access or UK public library membership required.)
- The History of Wormsley Estate. "About - History". The History of Wormsley Estate.
