= John Dalbier =

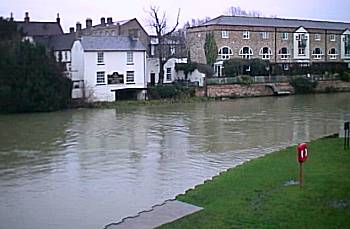
- River Great Ouse at St Neots; Dalbier was killed guarding a bridge near here in July 1648
- Born: c. 1600; Strasbourg
- Died: 10/11 July 1648 (aged 47–48); St Neots
- Military career
- Rank: Colonel
- Conflicts: Eighty Years War; Anglo-Spanish War (1625–1630); Saint-Martin-de-Ré; Thirty Years War; Capture of Neubrandenburg; Battle of Vlotho; Wars of the Three Kingdoms; Edgehill; Siege of Donnington Castle; Cheriton; Lostwithiel; Siege of Basing House; Siege of Wallingford Castle; St Neots †

John Dalbier, also known as Jan Dalbiere, c. 1600 to 11 July 1648, was a professional soldier from the Rhineland who fought in the Thirty Years War and the War of the Three Kingdoms. He served with the Parliamentarian army during the First English Civil War, then switched to the Royalist side in the Second English Civil War. He was killed at the Battle of St Neots.

Despite his long service, most of his career was spent in financial administration or logistics and he proved less competent as a military commander. Appointed paymaster to Ernst von Mansfeld in the early stages of the Thirty Years War, he subsequently transferred into English service, where his expertise was highly valued.

== Career; prior to 1642 ==
Dalbier is generally thought to have been a native of Strasbourg who fought for the Dutch Republic during the Eighty Years War. By 1622 he was paymaster to Count Ernst von Mansfeld and visited England on his behalf in 1622 to arrange financing for his army, then serving Frederick V of the Palatinate, son-in-law of James I. When Mansfeld died in the Balkans in 1624, Dalbier must have been present since he helped arrange his funeral in Venice.

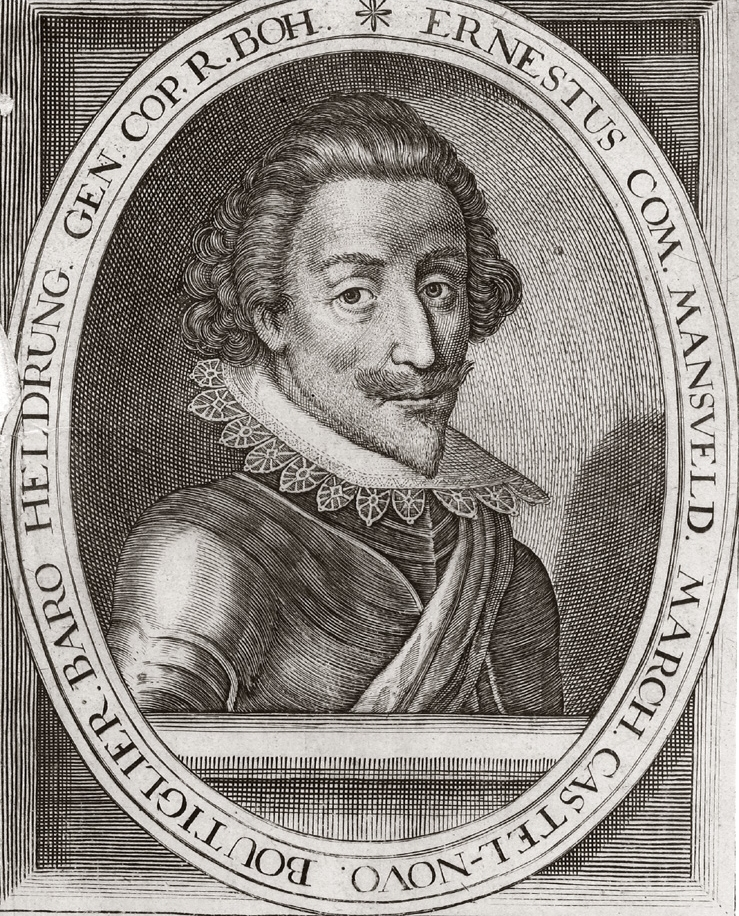
By 1622, Dalbier was paymaster for Ernst von Mansfeld, a famous commander of mercenaries

After failing to secure employment in the Venetian military, Dalbier returned to England where he found employment with George Villiers, 1st Duke of Buckingham. In May 1627, Buckingham sent him to the Netherlands to help organise support for Christian of Denmark's campaign against Emperor Ferdinand II. He provided similar services to Buckingham during the disastrous Siege of Saint-Martin-de-Ré (1627), but other officers allegedly resented his influence and low social status. Described as a man of 'great experience, but not of that strength of understanding and other parts as are necessary', he was sent back to England to organise reinforcements and supplies.

In 1628 to relieve Sir Charles Morgan's garrison that was defending Stade, Dalbier and Sir William Balfour were commissioned by King Charles I to raise a force of 1000 cavalry in Germany. However, as Morgan's garrison capitulated, the force was not decommissioned. This led to fears that the force would be used to suppress dissent in England; and in June 1628 questions regarding Dalbier's character, religious inclinations and military expertise were raised in the House of Commons. He was defended by Sir Thomas Jermyn, who pointed out that on his journey through Germany, it was his quick thinking and persuasive manner that had saved his companions from a detachment of Imperial troops because if he had chosen to, he would have been well-rewarded for betraying them.

In 1629 the Duke of Savoy, impressed by Dalbier's reputation suggested him as a possible negotiator with the Swiss cantons. The following year he served under Gustavus Adolphus and was taken prisoner by the Count of Tilly at the fall of Neu-Brandenburg in 1631. Although Charles I petitioned for his release, he was not set free until December 1632 after the death of Gustavus Adolphus.

== Wars of the Three Kingdoms ==
After Dalbier's release, he settled in England and in 1635 was living in the London parish of St Martin-in-the-Fields, where he was described as a German and a servant to the king. However by 1642 he had fallen on hard times and was detained in the king's bench prison for debt.

Robert Devereux, 3rd Earl of Essex secured Dalbier's release on condition that he fought for the Parliamentary cause. As colonel in command of a regiment of dozen or more troops of horse, he had an active war fighting for the Earl in many engagements including the battle of Cheriton where he received a wound. However, his military record was not unblemished, and he did not secure a commission in the New Model Army; instead, he was sent to serve under General Edward Massey. In 1645 he was involved in the skirmish at Basing House in Hampshire and took part in the final capture of the place, followed by the capture of Donnington Castle in Berkshire on 1 April 1646 and Wallingford Castle in July.

With the deterioration of relations between the Presbyterians in Parliament and the Independents in the New Model Army, Dalbier chose to side with the Presbyterians and, by July 1647, was active in trying to organise a defence of London against the advance of the New Model Army.

He was implicated in a coup in late July 1647 but left London before he could be arrested. When the Second English Civil War began in April 1648, he joined a group of Royalists in Huntingdonshire; on 9 July, he joined forces with a contingent from Surrey led by Henry Rich, 1st Earl of Holland and George Villiers, 2nd Duke of Buckingham. Early in the morning of 10 July, they were attacked at St Neots by 100 men from the New Model Army under Colonel Adrian Scrope. Dalbier was killed in the first attack, one of 12 Royalist casualties; according to Edmund Ludlow's largely elaborated memoirs, they "hewed him in pieces" because they resented his treachery, though according to John Rushworth he died of his wounds on the following day.

== Sources ==
- Hardwicke, Earl of (1778). Miscellaneous State Papers, 1501-1726, Volume II. Strahan & Cadell.
- Porter, Stephen (2004). "Dalbier, John (d. 1648)". Oxford Dictionary of National Biography (online ed.). Oxford University Press. doi:10.1093/ref:odnb/7010. (Subscription, Wikipedia Library access or UK public library membership required.)
- Royle, Trevor (2004). Civil War: The Wars of the Three Kingdoms 1638–1660. Abacus. ISBN 978-0-349-11564-1.
