= Siege of Lyme Regis =

Part of the First English Civil War

Coordinates: 50.725°N 2.940°W

- Part of the First English Civil War
Date	20 April – 16 June, 1644
Location	Lyme Regis, Dorset
Result	Parliamentarian victory

Belligerents
Royalists	Parliamentarians

Commanders and leaders
Prince Maurice	Thomas Ceeley; Robert Blake

Strength
2,500 – 6,000 troops	500–1,000 troops 240 reinforcements c. 900 seamen Civilians

Casualties and losses
2,000+	c. 120

Dorset and Lyme Regis

The siege of Lyme Regis was an eight-week blockade during the First English Civil War. The port of Lyme Regis, in Dorset, was considered to be of strategic importance because of its position along the main shipping route between Bristol and the English Channel. Thomas Ceeley and Robert Blake commanded the town's Parliamentarian defences during the siege, which was laid by Prince Maurice between 20 April and 16 June 1644.

At the start of the war, the people of Lyme Regis were predominantly Puritans, and the town was claimed by a pair of local members of parliament and garrisoned for the Parliamentarians. Most of the rest of Dorset, and the south-west of England in general, was under the control of the Royalists. The town, which only had sea-facing defences, feared an attack and Blake was charged with its fortification. He established a series of earthen defences featuring four forts which completely surrounded the town.

King Charles I ordered the capture of the town in early 1644, and sent his nephew, Maurice, with around 4,000 troops. The siege was laid on 20 April, but despite a steady bombardment, and three attempts to storm the town by ground, the town's defences held fast. Lyme Regis was regularly re-provisioned and reinforced by sea, weakening the effectiveness of the siege, and on 14 June, Maurice withdrew from the siege in the face of a relieving army led by Robert Devereux, 3rd Earl of Essex.

== Background ==
In April 1644, the First English Civil War had been running for 20 months, since King Charles I had raised his banner in Nottingham and declared the Earl of Essex, and by extension Parliament, traitors. That action had been the culmination of religious, fiscal and legislative tensions going back over fifty years.

=== State of the war in the West Country ===
By the end of 1643, most of the south-west of England was under Royalist control; only Plymouth, Poole and Lyme Regis held out against them. The Parliamentarians controlled the navy, and Lyme Regis was strategically important, due to its location between Bristol and the English Channel. While the town remained under Parliamentarian control, the Royalists could not reinforce or supply their army in the south-west. Conversely, should they succeed in capturing it, they would establish a line of garrisons along the West Country peninsula, from the Bristol Channel at Bristol, to the English Channel in Lyme, isolating the remaining Parliamentarian forces on the peninsula.

Prince Maurice was a 23-year-old nephew of Charles I. He and his brother, Prince Rupert, sailed to England in August 1642 to support their uncle. Maurice was initially given command of a cavalry regiment under his brother, who had been appointed commander of the Royalist cavalry. His reputation grew through the war, and he was put in charge of the Royalist forces in Gloucestershire and south Wales before being made lieutenant general for the south-west, acting as the second-in-command to the Marquess of Hertford. He spent 1643 campaigning in the region; he took part in the marginal Royalist victory at Lansdowne, the subsequent triumph at Roundway Down, then featured in the capture of Bristol. After arguments between Rupert and Hertford about who should act as governor of Bristol, the King summoned Hertford to Oxford, with Rupert in charge of the city. Maurice assumed sole command of the Royalist army in the south-west. He moved his army down to capture Exeter, before joining the unsuccessful siege of Plymouth. He fell ill towards the end of the year, and in December retired his forces to Tavistock and Plympton for the winter.

=== Lyme Regis ===
In the late 16th century Lyme Regis was a significant port, busier than Liverpool, which provided a link between England and mainland Europe. The combination of strong Puritan beliefs, and demands from King Charles I for ship money meant that upon the outbreak of the First English Civil War, the town was sympathetic to the Parliamentarian cause. Two local members of parliament (MP), Thomas Trenchard and Walter Erle claimed Lyme Regis for the Parliamentarians in 1642, and set about fortifying the town. Thomas Ceeley, the town's mayor, was assigned as governor of the town and its forces. He had ten companies garrisoned in Lyme Regis which was officially 1,000 men, but it is estimated that he may have had as few as half that number. He immediately set about removing those with Royalist loyalties from the area, and sent harrying forces around the region, as far as Exeter and Somerset.

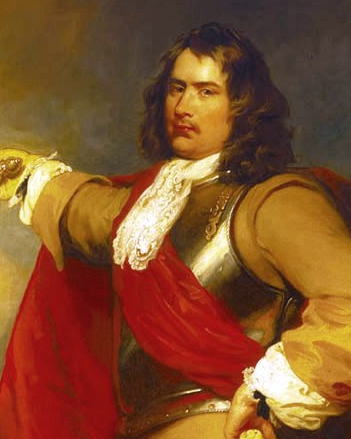
Drawing on his experiences from the storming of Bristol, Robert Blake oversaw the fortification of Lyme Regis.

The expectation was that Lyme Regis could be captured easily; the town was small, populated by 3,000 people at most, located in a valley that would give attackers the high ground, and composed mainly of thatched houses susceptible to fire. A contemporary writer described it as "a little vile fishing town defended by a small dry ditch." The town had no permanent land-facing fortifications, and so Robert Blake, who was sent to Lyme Regis after being rewarded with a promotion for his gallantry during the failed defence of Bristol, was tasked with improving its defences. Drawing upon his experience in Bristol, he established a set of earthen walls, ditches and forts around the perimeter of the town.

Lyme Regis's primary defence, which encircled the whole town, was dubbed the "Town Line". It was around 1 mile (1.6 km) long, and comprised a ditch with a raised 6-foot (1.8 m) rampart facing away from the town. Four blockhouses built primarily of earth and sod, but reinforced with stone and timber were incorporated into the defensive line, with walls 10 to 12 feet (3.0 to 3.7 m) thick. From east to west, the blockhouses were known as Newell's Fort, Davie's Fort, Gaitch's Fort and Marshall's Fort; named for the men who commanded them. No evidence of the defensive works remains, and so the positions of the defences have been conjectured by modern historians.

In The Mariner's Mirror, the Reverend J. R. Powell suggests that Newell's Fort guarded the road to Charmouth, in a location now covered by the sea, due to the coastal erosion suffered by Lyme Regis. In his history of the siege, Geoffrey Chapman accepts that possible location, but also offers an alternative location on top of Church Cliffs, also now lost to the sea. The pair agree on the locations of the remaining three forts, proposing that Davie's Fort lay somewhere around the modern-day junction between Church Road and Anning Road, citing the contemporary references to it having a commanding position which could fire into the bay or town itself. Gaitch's Fort, also known as Middle Fort, they placed near the bridge where Coombe Street meets Mill Lane. Marshall's Fort, later known as West Fort, featured a gate and was the main entrance into the town. Chapman and Powell located it where Pound Street, Broad Street and Silver Street now intersect, though others have suggested it was further out of town from Silver Street, near where it meets Pound Road and Woodmead Road. They both agreed that from West Fort the defences followed the line of modern-day Broad Street to meet the sea at Cobb Gate, just west of Bell Cliff. There were two more forts, which were permanent sea-facing buildings which did not feature in the siege.

== Prelude ==
Sources vary as to whether Maurice attacked Lyme Regis on the instructions of the King, or against them. In his history of the conflict in Dorset, Goodwin claims that "the King had sent letters to Prince Maurice warning him 'not to engage himself before Lyme or any other place'". In contrast, Roberts describes that "the king was determined upon subduing the town" and that he sent "a numerous body of men, and a complete train of artillery, under the command of Prince Maurice." In either case, Maurice gathered his troops, which he supplemented with additional men from garrisons throughout Devon, and marched towards Lyme Regis in March 1644. He initially quartered in the town of Beaminster on 7 April. From there a detachment of troops captured and then razed Stedcombe House near Axmouth, a property of Erle's that he had garrisoned. On 19 April, during a quarrel between some of the Irish and Cornish soldiers, a musket was fired in one of the houses in the town, setting it alight. Within two hours, the fire spread through most of the town, burning down 144 houses. The Royalists troops abandoned the town, plundering what items could be saved from the buildings, and established overnight quarters at Axminster.

== Siege ==
On 20 April, the day after arriving in Axminster, Maurice marched his army, estimated to consist of between 2,500 and 6,000 men, to around 3/4 mile (1.2 km) of Lyme Regis, and then after some posturing between the opposing forces, the Royalists captured Haye House, about 1/4 mile (400 m) from the town, which had been garrisoned with around thirty defenders. On the third day of the siege, the attackers set up their artillery on the west side of town, and began a bombardment, but the next day Ceeley sent a force of 190 men to attack the battery, and forced the Royalists from their position. New batteries were set up around the town, and the besieging forces continued to attack the town with their ordnance. On 28 April, Maurice ordered an advance on the town, but the attack got little further than the range of musket-shot. The next day, the town was restocked with ammunition and food, and reinforced with just over a hundred men from two Parliamentarian ships, the Mary Rose and the Ann and Joyce.

Throughout the war, the garrisoned army was supported by the women of the town; they aided in the building of the earthen fortifications, and then later disguised themselves as men during the siege to make it appear that the town was held by more troops than it really was. They also ran ammunition around the town and helped to reload the weapons. Their efforts drew comparisons to Joan of Arc, and an essay was written by James Strong detailing their achievements, entitled "Joanereidos, or Feminine Valour eminently discovered in West County Women, at the Siege of Lyme, 1644."

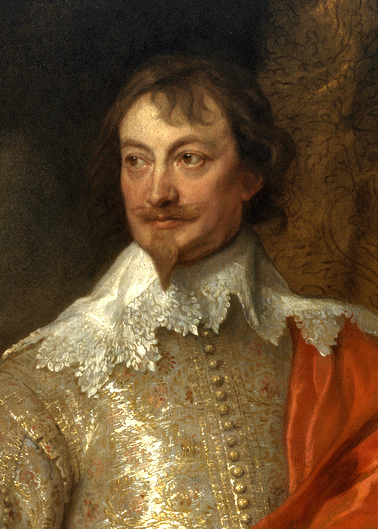
Provisions and reinforcements provided by Robert Rich, 2nd Earl of Warwick, the commander of the Parliamentarian navy, were vital for Lyme Regis's defence.

Over the following week, the Royalist forces held the siege, but did not engage with the town again until 6 May, when they attacked the town in three places during a thick fog. The defenders were caught off guard slightly, as many of their soldiers were eating their evening supper. The Parliamentarians rallied quickly, and within an hour had repelled the attack. An account kept by the Lyme Regis garrison records that around one hundred of the besieging army had been killed, while the garrison had only lost one man. The following day, Maurice requested a parley so that the dead could be buried. That request was granted, in exchange for the town's defenders being able to claim any weaponry on the battleground. Over the next week, there was little fighting between the armies, and a further seven ships arrived to aid the town, including 240 soldiers from Sir William Waller's army, and on 15 May a further 120 men were sent by the Earl of Warwick.

The Royalists turned their attention to the harbour over the next week, placing artillery units on the cliff-tops above it, and bombarding any ships within. On the morning of 22 May, such an attack sunk a barge laden with malt and peas, and was followed by a raiding party of around 50 men that evening, who attacked the harbour, setting fire to the barges that remained. During the fighting to drive them back, Captain Thomas Pyne, who had commanded the town's cavalry, was mortally wounded. Pyne died of fever four days later, despite the attentions of a surgeon. The Earl of Warwick arrived on 23 May with eight ships and the promise of as much help as he could provide, including 400 of his seamen to help garrison the town. Pyne's funeral was held on 27 May, and upon the firing volley from the town's ordnance and musketeers, the besieging army signalled a second attempt to storm the town. The town came under barrage from the enemy batteries, and scaling ladders were brought against the earthen fortifications. Once again the attack was repelled by the town's defenders, and a parley request from Maurice in the immediate aftermath was turned down for fear of treachery.

The town was further reinforced with 300 sailors the next day, before another attack on the town was launched on 29 May. A few ships had been sent as a decoy to split the Royalist forces, but only succeeded in sending a small detachment of cavalry and foot away, though they quickly returned when it was clear that the ships were not going to land. Around midday, the batteries began to heavily bombard the town, followed by a ground attack which managed to breach the fortifications. After eight hours of fighting, the Parliamentarians rebuffed the attack. Fourteen more ships arrived two days later, bringing further provisions and ammunition, and news that a relieving force would be sent to aid the town. By this stage, Maurice realised that he was unlikely to be able to capture the town, and so was determined to destroy it instead. Fires were set on 1 June and then no attacks other than light bombardments were made until 11 June, when heavier, red-hot shot was fired to try to set more fires in the town.

Despite orders to lay siege to the King's headquarters at Oxford, the Earl of Essex opted to attempt to reclaim the south-west for the Parliamentarians, first retaking Weymouth, and then marching towards Lyme Regis. Hearing of the fall of Weymouth, and the impending arrival of the Earl of Essex's relieving army, Maurice abandoned his siege during the night of 14 June. The 17th-century historian Edward Hyde suggested that Maurice had suffered "some loss of reputation, for having lain so long with such a strength before so vile and untenable a place, without reducing it."

== Aftermath ==
Maurice retreated to Exeter, while the Earl of Essex continued down into Devon and Cornwall, after sending Blake to capture Taunton. Essex swept through Somerset and Devon, and succeeded in relieving Plymouth. He continued to press his army into Cornwall, but became isolated from supporting Parliamentarian forces. A large Royalist army commanded by the King, with support from the Lord Hopton and Prince Maurice, trapped Essex, and his army suffered a total defeat at the Battle of Lostwithiel in early September 1644. Essex escaped in a fishing boat, while his remaining forces retreated back to Dorset, leaving only Plymouth, Lyme Regis and Taunton under Parliamentarian control in the south-west. Essex, who had been the commander of the entire Parliamentarian army, fell from grace after the defeat; he was one of a committee of leaders appointed at the second Battle of Newbury, and was sidelined by the creation of the New Model Army, eventually resigning his military commissions the following March. Maurice, after success at Lostwithiel, also featured at Newbury, and subsequently commanded the Royalist armies from Worcester. He left the Royalist army in late 1645 after the King charged Prince Rupert with treachery, and the both brothers left England for continental Europe the following year.

Blake successfully captured Taunton, and held it for the remainder of the war despite three sieges by Royalist forces. After the war, he was honoured by Parliament for his efforts and rewarded with £500. He took no side during the Second Civil War and, three years later, under the Commonwealth of England, he became a general at sea, as one of the three commissioners of the navy, and spent the rest of his life as a naval commander, for which he remains best known.

The Earl of Warwick sent a letter to Parliament, detailing the hardships endured by Lyme Regis during the siege, and requesting "some speedy course will be taken for their relief". Parliament voted to grant the town £1,000 a year and that unconditional compensation should be paid to residents who had suffered losses in the siege. Lyme maintained a garrison through the war, finally disbanding in July 1647.

== Bibliography ==
- Barratt, John (2004). Cavalier Generals: King Charles I and His Commanders in the English Civil War 1642–46. Barnsley: Pen & Sword Military. ISBN 978-1-84415-128-8.
- Bayley, A.R. (1910). The Great Civil War in Dorset 1642–1660. Taunton: Barnicott and Pearce. OCLC 6937209.
- Bennett, Martyn (2005). The Civil Wars Experienced: Britain and Ireland, 1638–1661. London: Routledge. ISBN 0-203-98180-4.
- Bleiberg, Edward; Soergel, Philip, eds. (2005). "The English Civil Wars". Arts and Humanities Through the Eras. Vol. 5: The Age of the Baroque and Enlightenment 1600–1800. Detroit: Gale. ISBN 978-0-787-65697-3.
- Chapman, Geoffrey (1982). The Siege of Lyme Regis. Lyme Regis: Serendip Books. ISBN 0-9504143-9-5.
- Davidson, James (1851). Axminster during The Civil War. E. Wills. OCLC 650382943.
- Dugdale, James (1819). The New British Traveller. London: J and J Cundee. OCLC 315590924.
- Ellison, Gerald (1936). The Sieges of Taunton in 1644–5. Taunton: Somerset County Herald. OCLC 852019005.
- Goodwin, Tim (1996). Dorset in the Civil War 1625–1665. Tiverton: Dorset Books. ISBN 1-871164-26-5.
- Hibbert, Christopher (1993). Cavaliers and Roundheads: The English at War 1642–1649. London: HarperCollins. ISBN 978-0-246-13632-9.
- Hyde, Edward (1816). The History of the Rebellion and Civil Wars in England. Vol. 2. Oxford: Clarendon Press. p. 680. OCLC 1431493.
- Manganiello, Stephen C. (2004). The Concise Encyclopedia of the Revolutions and Wars of England, Scotland, and Ireland, 1639–1660. Lanham, Maryland: The Scarecrow Press. ISBN 0-8108-5100-8.
- Morrill, John (2008) [2004]. "Devereux, Robert, third earl of Essex". Oxford Dictionary of National Biography (online ed.). Oxford University Press. doi:10.1093/ref:odnb/7566. (Subscription, Wikipedia Library access or UK public library membership required.)
- Morris, Robert (1995). The Sieges of Taunton 1644–1645. Bristol: Stuart Press. ISBN 978-1-85804-057-8.
- Moseley, Sophia (18 June 2015). "The Siege of Lyme Regis – what inspired inhabitants to fight the Royalists". Dorset Magazine. Archant Community Media Ltd.
- Powell, Rev J. R. (1934). "Blake and the Defence of Lyme Regis". The Mariner's Mirror. 20 (4): 448–474. doi:10.1080/00253359.1934.10655775. ISSN 2049-680X.
- "Robert Blake". Westminster Abbey.
- Roberts, George (1823). The History of Lyme-Regis, Dorset, from the Earliest Periods to the Present Day. Sherborne: Langdon and Harker. OCLC 794348030.
- Roy, Ian (2004). "Maurice, prince palatine of the Rhine". Oxford Dictionary of National Biography (online ed.). Oxford University Press. doi:10.1093/ref:odnb/18383. (Subscription, Wikipedia Library access or UK public library membership required.)
- Stewart, William (2009). Admirals of the World: A Biographical Dictionary, 1500 to the Present. Jefferson, North Carolina: McFarland & Company. ISBN 978-0-7864-3809-9.
- Wickenden, H. J. (1947) [1938]. The History of Taunton. Taunton: E. Goodman and Son. OCLC 852018781.
