= Michael Noble (Parliamentarian) =

Michael Noble (1591 – February 1649) was an English puritan who represented Lichfield during the Long Parliament and sided with Parliament during the English Civil War.

== Biography ==
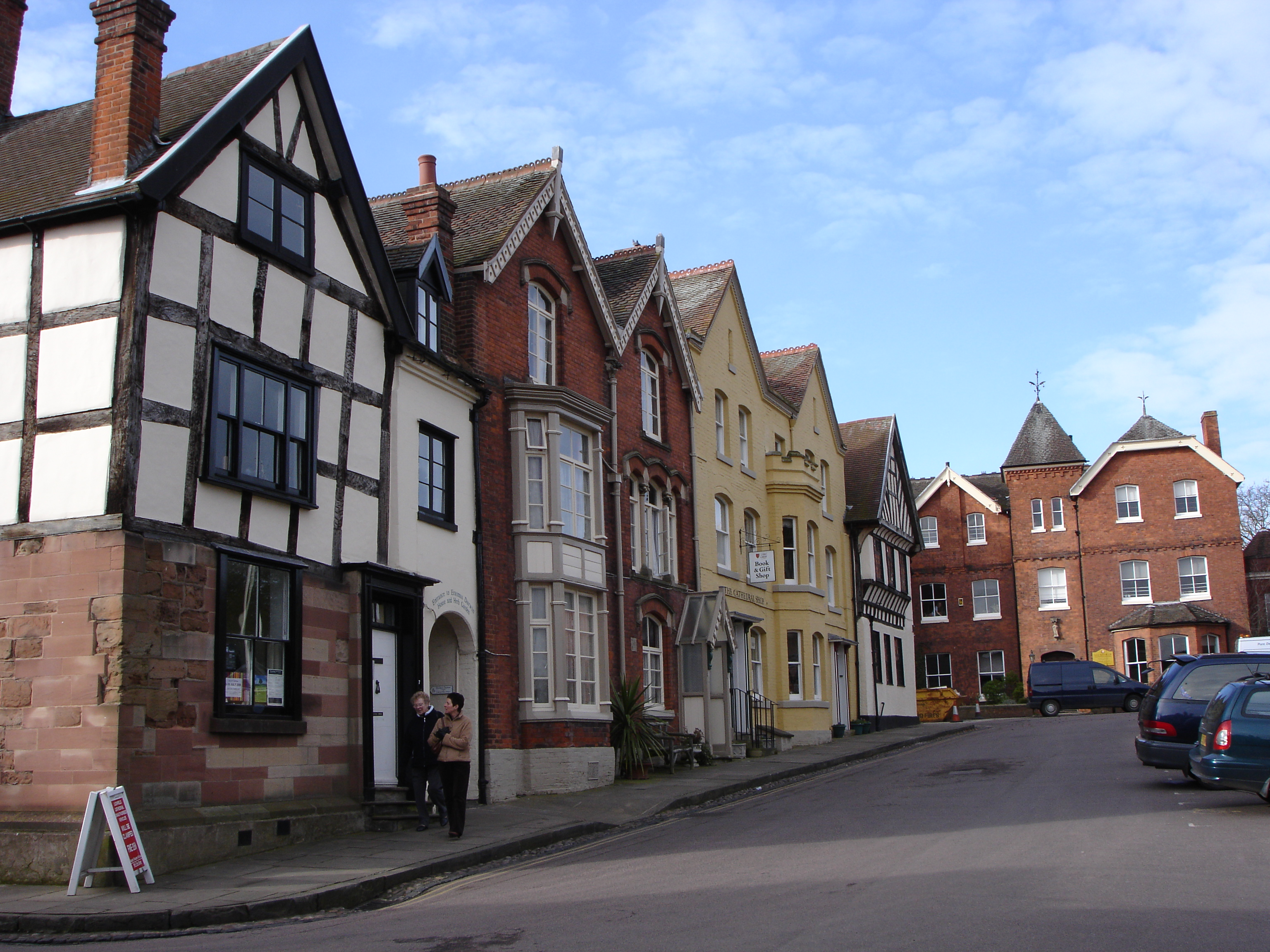
Lichfield Cathedral Close

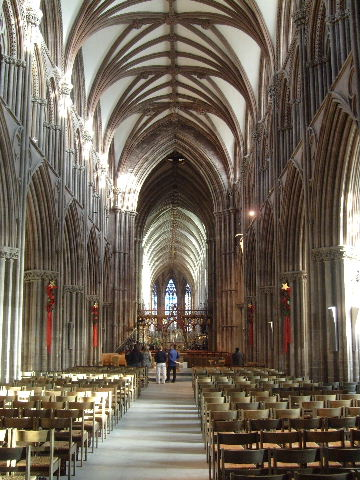
Lichfield Cathedral

Noble was the son of Edward Noble and Isabell Lowe, daughter of Humfrey Lowe of Halesowen and his wife Joane Cooke. He was educated at Queen's College, Oxford matriculating aged 16 on 15 May 1607. He was probably an attorney and was elected coroner for Lichfield in 1625. He was described as a gentleman of the Close of the Cathedral when in 1631 he compounded for not accepting a knighthood by paying £10. By 1637 he was Town Clerk.

In 1640, Noble was elected to the Long Parliament as one of the two burgesses for Lichfield city. On 6 June 1643 he took the Parliamentary oath and covenant, and on 25 September subscribed to The Solemn League and Covenant. During 1643 he was on the Assessment Commission for Staffordshire, and on the Sequestration Committee for the County and City of Lichfield. In 1644 he was on the Commission in the Ordinance for Assessment of East and West, and on 11 April that year was on the Grocer's Hall Committee of Accounts.

Noble was on the Committee of the House on the Self-denying Ordinance on 24 March 1645 and was one of 68 members to whom the £4 allowance per week was ordered on 3 June 1645. He became Deputy Lieutenant for Staffordshire on 23 August 1645. On 16 September 1645 he was on the committee to prepare the Ordnance for the disposal of the Bishop of Lichfield's estates.

Noble was on the committee for settling a preaching ministry on 7 April 1646. However he appears to have fallen sick, and was excused the call of the House in 1646 and 1647 and was not excluded in Pride's Purge on 6 December 1648. He died in February 1649 and was buried in Lichfield Cathedral.

== Family ==
Noble married Maria Cotton, daughter of Walter Cotton of Crakemarsh in around 1619 and they lived at Lichfield Close where their family were born.

In January 1638 Maria Noble, his wife and an ardent puritan, was involved in an incident in Lichfield Cathedral. Maria Noble, Lady Eleanor Davies and Susan Walker, wife of Rev. John Walker, brawled in the Cathedral "with a pot of water, tar, and other filthy things, most profanely defiled the hangings at the altar of the cathedral, and said they had sprinkled holy water on them against the next communion". The wife of Sir Simon Weston former MP, remonstrated with them, but they replied that "they had but done their duty".

One of Noble's descendants, Walter Savage Landor, included him in the Imaginary Conversations in conversation with Oliver Cromwell, although he erroneously named him Walter Noble.

== Notes ==
Parliament of England
Preceded by Richard Dyott; Sir Walter Devereux	Member of Parliament for Lichfield; 1640–1648; With: Sir Walter Devereux 1640–1641; Sir Richard Cave 1641–1642; Michael Buddulph 1642–1648	Succeeded by Rump Parliament
