= Richard Cave =

English politician

Sir Richard Cave (died 16 June 1645) was an English politician who sat in the House of Commons in 1640. He fought on the Royalist side in the English Civil War and was killed at the Battle of Naseby.

Cave was the son of Thomas Cave of St Helens Worcester and his wife Katherine Jones, daughter of Walter Jones of Witney, Oxfordshire. He received the support of Prince Rupert and in November 1640 was elected Member of Parliament for Lichfield in the Long Parliament. He was disabled from sitting in parliament in 1642 for supporting the King.

Cave became Governor of Hereford Castle after the Royalists re-captured the town in 1642, but on 25 April 1643, the Parliamentarian forces under General Waller attacked Hereford and found little opposition. Waller demanded the surrender of the City, and a £3000 ransom, and imposed fines on the citizens instead of plunder. Cave was court-marshalled for the surrender of the City but he explained how reluctant the citizens had been to help with the defence and was acquitted. Cave subsequently fought at the Battle of Naseby where he was killed on 16 June 1645.

Cave married Elizabeth Bartlett, daughter of Sir Thomas Bartlett.

Parliament of England
Preceded by Richard Dyott; Sir Walter Devereux,	Member of Parliament for Lichfield; 1640; With: Michael Noble	Succeeded by Michael Noble; Michael Biddulph
