= Michael Noble =

Michael Noble may refer to:

- Michael Noble (Parliamentarian) (1591–1649), English Member of Parliament for Lichfield in the Long Parliament
- Michael Noble, Baron Glenkinglas (1913–1984), Scottish Conservative politician, Member of Parliament 1958–1974
- Michael Noble (Labour politician) (1935–1983), English Labour Member of Parliament for Rossendale 1974–1979
- Mike Noble, British comic artist and illustrator

== See also ==
- Michael Nobel (born 1940), Swedish humanitarian
