= Battle of Naseby =

1645 battle of the First English Civil War

- Part of the First English Civil War
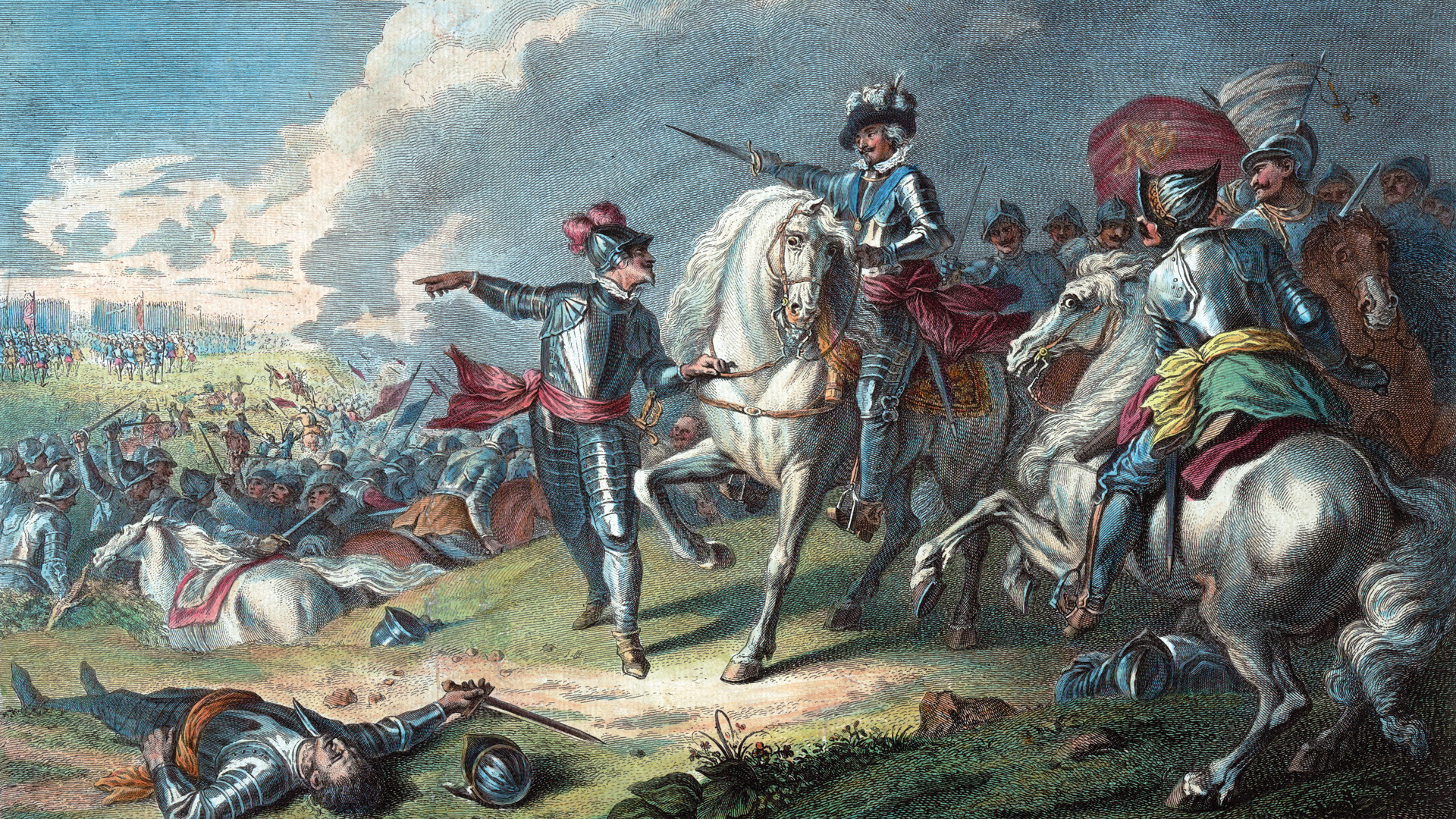
- Engraving of the battle
| Date | 14 June 1645 |
| Location | Near Naseby, Northamptonshire |
| Result | Parliamentarian victory |

Belligerents
| Parliamentarians | Royalists |

Commanders and leaders
| Sir Thomas Fairfax; Oliver Cromwell; Henry Ireton; Philip Skippon | Charles I; Prince Rupert; Lord Astley; Marmaduke Langdale |

Strength
| 6,000 horse, 7,000 foot, 676 dragoons | 4,100 horse, 3,300 foot |

Casualties and losses
| 200 killed 535 wounded | 1,000 killed or wounded 4,500 captured |

The Battle of Naseby took place on 14 June 1645 during the First English Civil War, near the village of Naseby in Northamptonshire. The Parliamentarian New Model Army, commanded by Sir Thomas Fairfax and Oliver Cromwell, destroyed the main Royalist army under Charles I and Prince Rupert. The defeat ended any real hope of Royalist victory, although Charles did not finally surrender until May 1646.

The 1645 campaign began in April when the newly formed New Model Army marched west to relieve Taunton, before being ordered back to lay siege to Oxford, the Royalist wartime capital. On 31 May, the Royalists stormed Leicester and Fairfax was instructed to abandon the siege and engage them. Although heavily outnumbered, Charles decided to stand and fight and after several hours of combat, his force was effectively destroyed. The Royalists suffered over 1,000 casualties, with over 4,500 of their infantry captured and paraded through the streets of London; they would never again field an army of comparable quality.

They also lost all their artillery and stores, along with Charles' personal baggage and private papers, which revealed his attempts to bring the Irish Catholic Confederation and foreign mercenaries into the war. These were published in a pamphlet titled The King's Cabinet Opened, whose appearance was a great boost to the cause of Parliament.

== Background ==
In July 1644, a Roundhead (Parliamentarian) force under Thomas Fairfax and Oliver Cromwell secured control of Northern England by victory at Marston Moor. However, this was offset first by defeat at Lostwithiel in September, and then by a lack of decisiveness at the Second Battle of Newbury in October. The two commanders involved, Essex and Manchester, were accused by many in Parliament of lacking commitment, a group that included moderates like William Waller as well as radicals like Cromwell.

In December, Henry Vane the Younger introduced the Self-denying Ordinance, requiring any military officers to resign from Parliament. As members of the House of Lords, Manchester and Essex were automatically removed since, unlike Members of Parliament, they could not resign their titles, although they could be re-appointed, 'if Parliament approved.' It also led to the creation of the New Model Army, a centralised, professional force. Moderates Fairfax and Philip Skippon were appointed Commander-in-Chief and head of the infantry, respectively; Cromwell remained an MP but was given command of the cavalry on a 'temporary' three-month commission, constantly renewed.

Key locations 1644 to 1645

At the outset of 1645, the Royalist high command was divided on strategy. Prince Rupert of the Rhine, recently appointed senior commander, wanted to link up with his brother Prince Maurice at Chester and retake the north, a key source of recruits and supplies. A faction headed by Lord Digby considered the New Model a threat to their capital at Oxford, while a third group preferred to consolidate control of the West Country. On 30 April, Fairfax marched west to relieve the Parliamentarian stronghold of Taunton; Lord Goring was despatched with 3,000 cavalry to support the Siege of Taunton, while the main Royalist field army of 8,600 men under Charles I and Prince Rupert moved north.

Concerned by this threat, Parliament's Committee of Both Kingdoms ordered Fairfax to change his plans and besiege Oxford. Although he made little progress, by the end of May the town was running short of provisions and to relieve the pressure, the Royalists stormed the Parliamentarian-held town of Leicester on 31 May, allegedly killing over 700 soldiers and civilians. Alarmed by this, Parliament instructed Fairfax to abandon the siege and on 5 June he marched north to engage the Royalist army. Unlike Prince Rupert who had been beaten by Fairfax and Cromwell the previous summer, Digby and Charles dismissed the fighting capabilities of the New Model. Despite being seriously outnumbered, they were eager for battle; messages were sent ordering Goring to rejoin them, but he refused to leave the West Country.

On 12 June, the Royalists were alerted to the presence of the New Model when Parliamentarian patrols clashed with their outposts near Daventry. The next day, Fairfax was reinforced by Cromwell's cavalry and troops from the Eastern Association under Edward Rossiter, bringing his numbers up to 14,000. Although Prince Rupert favoured withdrawing, Digby convinced Charles that retreat would be bad for morale and they decided to stand and fight.

== Battle ==
1792 map of the disposition of the two armies. The Royalists are at top.

The morning of 14 June was foggy, preventing the opposing armies from sighting each other across the battlefield. The Royalists occupied a strong position on a ridge between the villages of Little Oxendon and East Farndon about 2 miles (3.2 km) south of Market Harborough. The Royalist scoutmaster, Sir Francis Ruce, was sent out to find the Parliamentarian army and rode south for 2 or 3 miles (3.2 or 4.8 km) but saw no sign of it, perhaps through negligence. Rupert himself moved forward and saw some Parliamentarian cavalry, apparently retiring. He was determined to secure the commanding Naseby ridge and ordered the Royalist army to advance.

Fairfax initially considered occupying the northern slopes of Naseby ridge. Cromwell believed that this position was too strong, and that the Royalists would refuse battle rather than attack it. He is said to have sent a message to Fairfax, saying, "I beseech you, withdraw to yonder hill, which may provoke the enemy to charge us". Fairfax agreed, and moved his army back slightly.

The Royalists did not see Fairfax's position until they reached the village of Clipston, just over a mile north of Naseby ridge. It was clearly impossible for the Royalists to withdraw to their original position without being attacked by the Parliamentarian cavalry while on the line of march and therefore at a disadvantage. Rupert deployed the army to its right, where the ground appeared to be more favourable for his own cavalry and prepared for battle.

=== Deployments ===
==== Royalists ====
The Royalists occupied a front of about a mile and a half, between the Clipston-Naseby track on the left and the Sulby Hedges on the right. Their right wing consisted of between 2,000 and 3,000 cavalry under Prince Rupert and his brother Prince Maurice. The centre was commanded by Lord Astley and organised as three infantry brigades or tertias under Sir George Lisle, Henry Bard and Astley's son, Sir Bernard Astley, with a regiment of horse under Colonel Howard in support. On the left under Sir Marmaduke Langdale were 1,500 "Northern Horse", the remnants of cavalry regiments which had escaped from Marston Moor. Charles commanded a small reserve, consisting of his own and Rupert's regiments of foot (800 in total) and his lifeguard of horse.

==== Parliamentarians ====
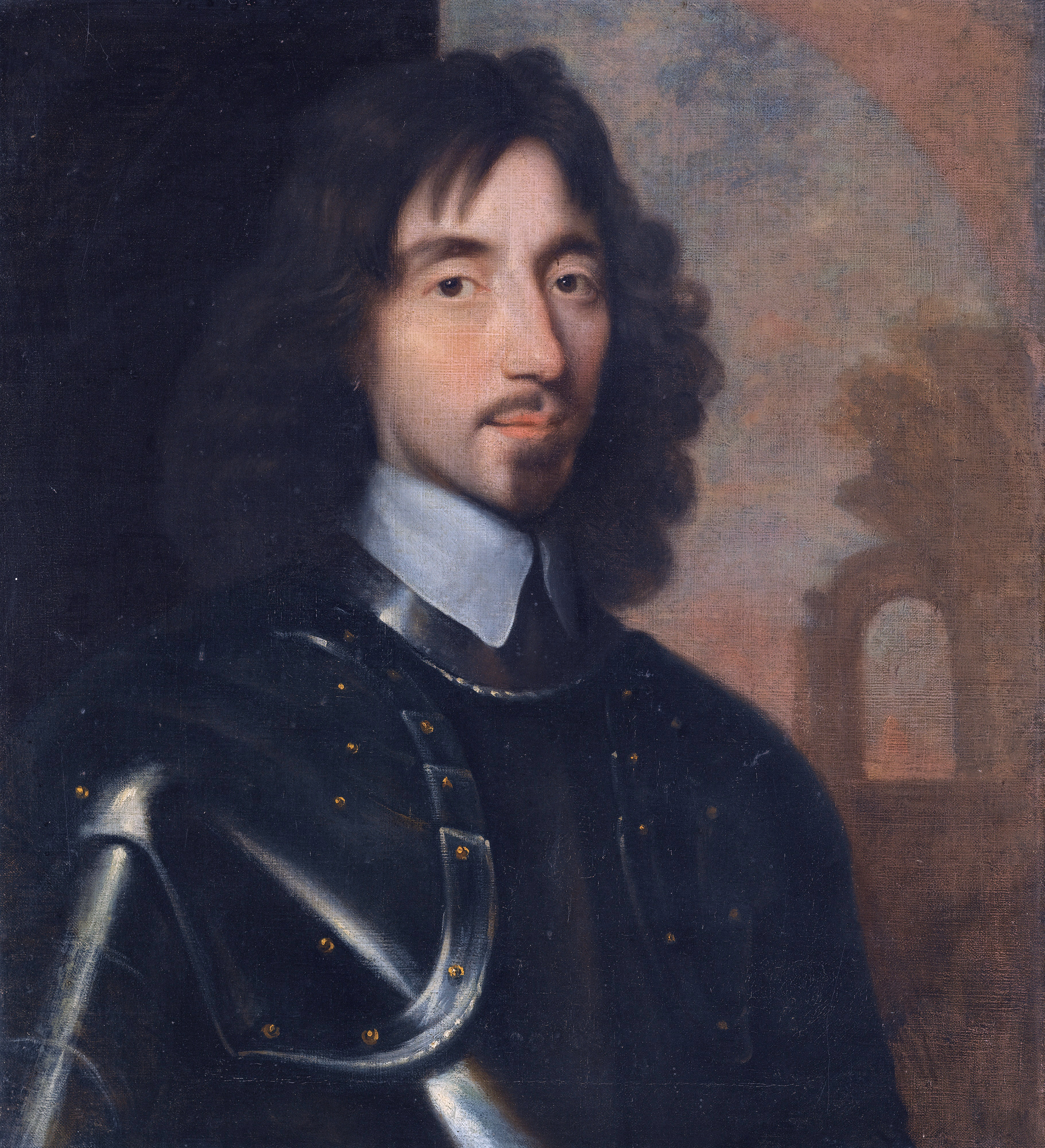
Sir Thomas Fairfax, the overall Parliamentarian commander

Fairfax had drawn up his army on the ridge a mile north of Naseby, although some of it was behind the crest on the reverse slope. Ireton's wing of five and a half regiments of cavalry was on the left. The infantry under Sergeant-Major General Sir Philip Skippon was in the centre with five regiments on the front line and three in support. A forlorn hope of 300 musketeers was deployed to the front, with a reserve provided by two companies of Colonel Edward Harley's regiment, commanded by its Lieutenant Colonel Thomas Pride. A Parliamentarian engraving of the battle shows 11 pieces of artillery, in the intervals between the infantry regiments. They played little part in the battle; their first salvoes went high, and the Royalist and Parliamentarian infantry were subsequently too closely engaged for the guns to be used. Cromwell's wing, with six and a half regiments of cavalry, was on the right.

The Parliamentarian army occupied a front about 2 miles (3.2 km) long. They outflanked the Royalist left, but their own left flank rested, like the Royalists' right flank, on the Sulby Hedges. At the last minute, as the Royalists began to advance, Cromwell sent a regiment of dragoons under Colonel John Okey into the Sulby Hedges, where they could fire into the flank of Rupert's cavalry. The number of dragoons has generally been reported as their official strength of 1,000 but an analysis of pay warrants shows it was no more than 676 in total.

=== Action ===
The Royalist centre attacked first, with Rupert keeping his own wing of cavalry in hand so that the horse and foot could hit the enemy simultaneously. Skippon's infantry moved forward over the crest of the ridge to meet the Royalist foot. There was time for only one volley of musketry before both sides were fighting hand-to-hand, the veteran Royalist infantry using their swords and the butt ends of their muskets. Sir Edward Walker, Charles's secretary of war, stated "The Foot on either side hardly saw each other until they were within Carabine Shot, and so made only one Volley; our falling in with Sword and butt end of the Musquet did notable Execution, so much as I saw their Colours fall and their Foot in great Disorder." [sic] Skippon was wounded by a bullet which splintered his armour and struck him under the ribs, although he stayed on the field to prevent panic from spreading. Even so, the Parliamentarians were hard-pressed and forced back.

On the Parliamentarian left, the opposing wings of horse paused briefly to dress ranks before charging into each other. Henry Ireton's own regiment repulsed their Royalist opposite numbers, but Ireton then led at least part of them to the aid of the beleaguered Parliamentarian infantry. His troopers were driven off by Royalist pikemen, and Ireton himself was unhorsed, wounded in the leg and face and taken prisoner. At the same time, the second line of Royalist cavalry broke most of the Parliamentarian horsemen. Some of Ireton's regiments, on the far left, were saved from destruction by the fire from Okey's dragoons, but the others broke and fled, some of them not stopping until they reached Northampton, 15 miles (24 km) away. The entire Royalist right wing had been committed to defeating Ireton, and none were left in reserve. Rupert either neglected or was unable to rally the cavalier horsemen, who galloped off the battlefield in pursuit of the fleeing Parliamentarians.

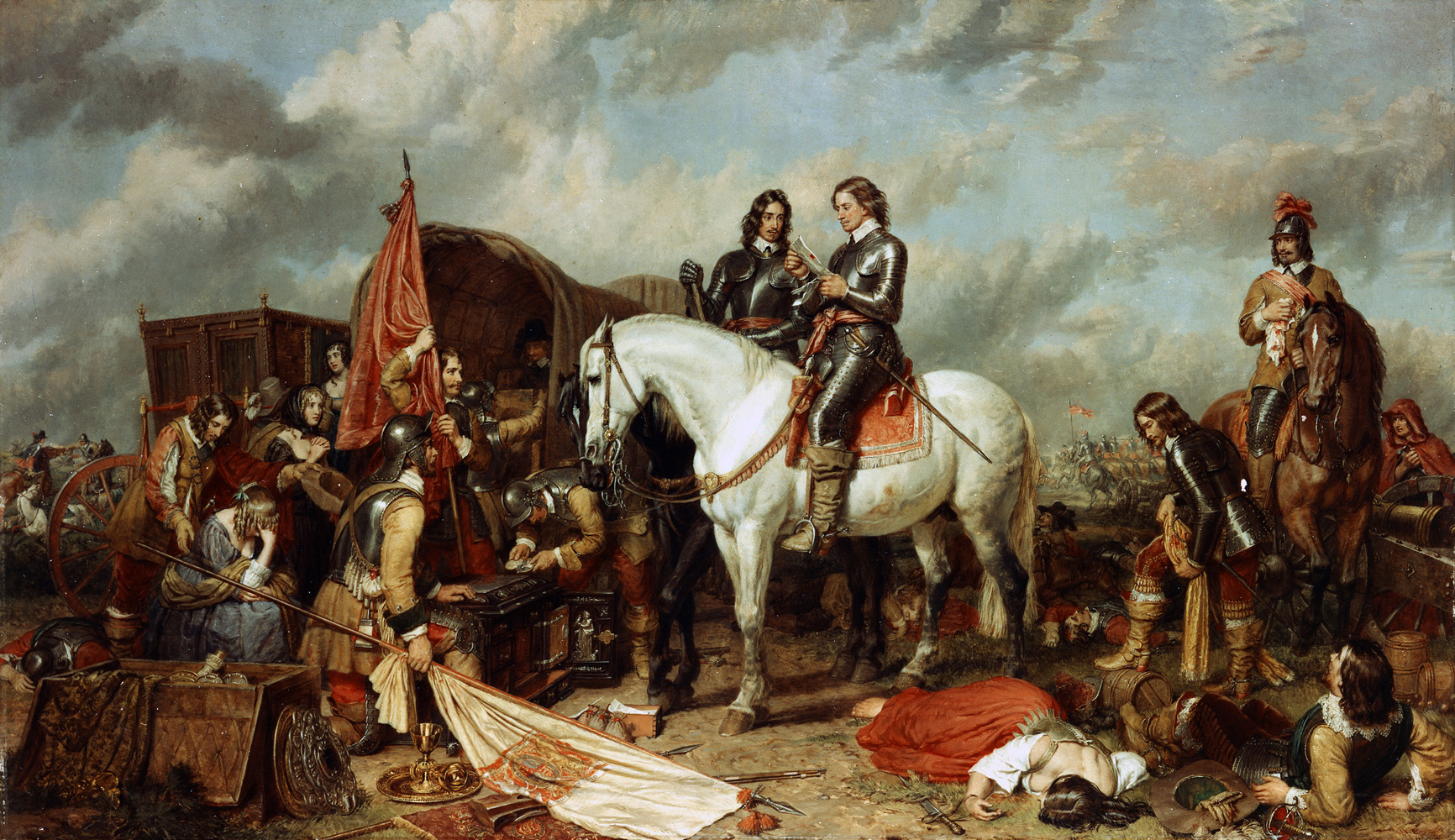
Cromwell at the Battle of Naseby by Charles Landseer, 1851

Meanwhile, the Parliamentarian right wing of horse under Cromwell and the Royalist Northern Horse faced each other, neither willing to charge to the aid of their infantry while the other could threaten their flank. Eventually, after half an hour, the Royalist cavalry began to charge and Cromwell's troops moved to meet them. Langdale's men were not only outflanked and outnumbered two to one, but forced to charge up a slope broken up by bushes and a rabbit warren. After a brief contest, they were routed. Unlike Rupert, Cromwell had roughly half of his wing uncommitted, as only the front line of Cromwell's wing had taken part in the defeat of Langdale. He sent only four divisions (roughly two regiments) after Langdale, and turned his reserves against the left flank and rear of the Royalist centre. At about the same time, Okey's dragoons mounted their horses and charged from the Sulby Hedges against the right wing of the Royalist infantry, as did some of Ireton's regiments which had partly rallied.

Some of the trapped Royalist infantry began to throw down their arms and call for quarter; others tried to conduct a fighting retreat. One regiment, apparently Rupert's "Bluecoats", stood their ground and repulsed all attacks. One eyewitness said "The Blue regiment of the Kings stood to it very stoutly, and stirred not, like a wall of brasse...". [sic] Eventually, Fairfax led his own regiment of foot and horse against them, breaking their resistance, with Fairfax reportedly capturing their standard himself. Archaeological evidence, chiefly recovered musket balls, suggests this episode took place in the vicinity of Long Hold Spinney, about 1 kilometre (0.62 mi) behind the original Royalist positions.

At some stage, the King attempted to lead his lifeguard of horse to the rescue of his centre or in a counter-attack against Cromwell's troopers, but was prevented from doing so by a Scottish nobleman, the Earl of Carnwath, who seized his bridle and said, "Would you go upon your death, Sire?" Seeing the King swerve away from the enemy, his lifeguard also retreated in disorder for several hundred yards. Meanwhile, Rupert's cavalry had reached Naseby and the Parliamentarian baggage, whose escort refused to surrender and drove them off. Although Rupert rallied his men and returned to the battlefield, it was now too late to save the remnants of their infantry, and he could not induce his cavalry to make another charge. Fairfax halted and reorganised his lines, and when he resumed his advance, the Royalist cavalry withdrew to Ashby-de-la-Zouch.

Fairfax's forces pursued survivors fleeing north towards Leicester. Archaeological evidence suggests fugitives and Royalist baggage guards tried to rally on the slopes of Castle Yard (also known as Wadborough Hill), a wooded hill with the ruins of a motte and bailey castle, about 1.5 miles (2.4 km) behind the original battle line. Many Royalists were slaughtered when they mistakenly followed what they thought was the main road to Leicester into the churchyard in the village of Marston Trussell, and were unable to escape their pursuers. In the aftermath of the battle, Parliamentarian troops reportedly killed at least 100 female camp followers and mutilated many others. This was supposedly done in the belief they were Irish, though the women were probably Welsh whose language was mistaken for Irish.

== Aftermath ==
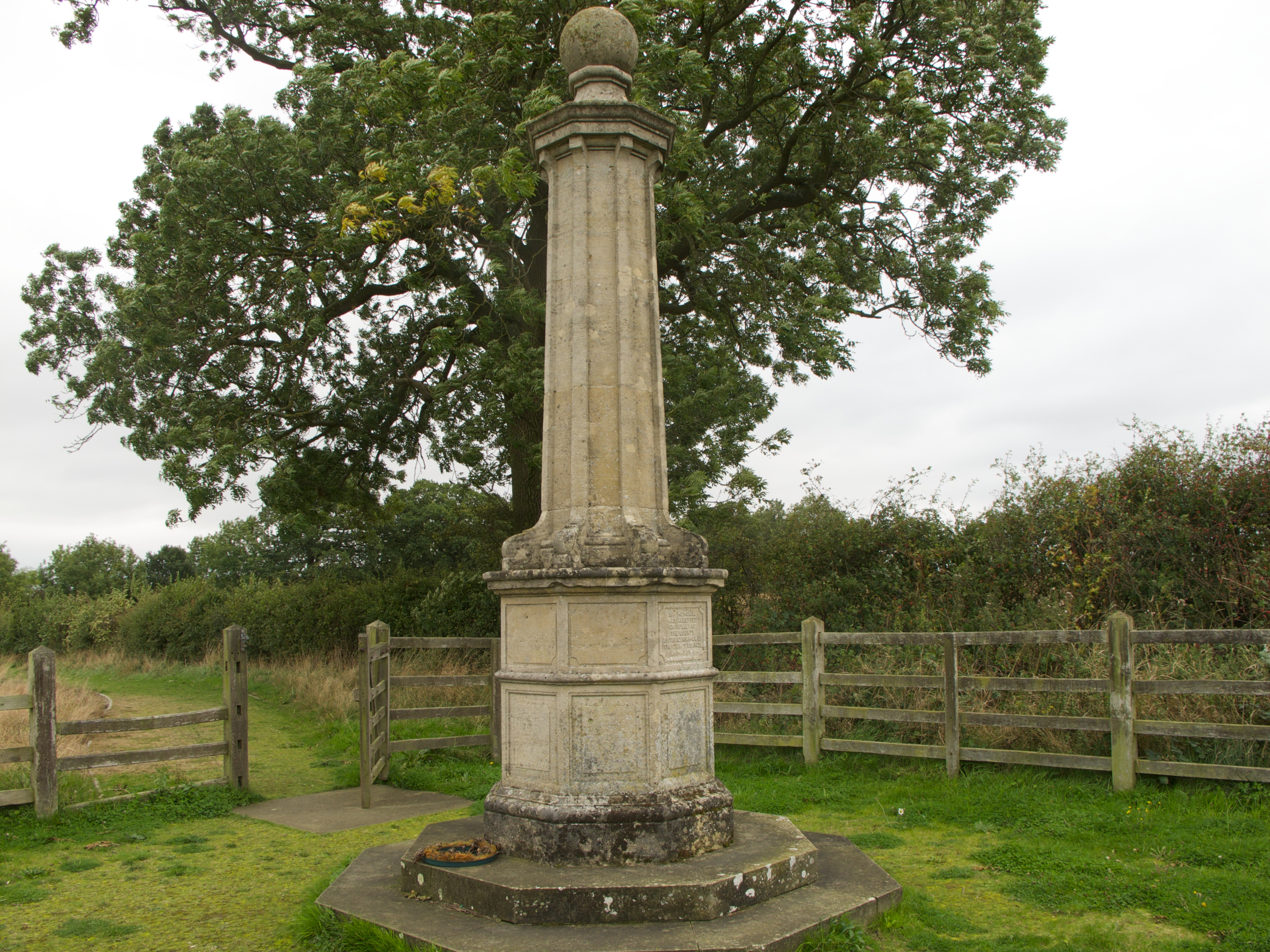
Monument to the battle

Fairfax recovered Leicester on 18 June. He immediately led his army southwest to relieve Taunton and capture the Royalist-held West Country. The Royalist forces surrendered at Truro in Cornwall, while leading Royalist commanders, including Lord Hopton, the Prince of Wales, Sir Edward Hyde, and Lord Capell, fled to Jersey from Falmouth.

The main Royalist military force had been shattered at Naseby. The King had lost his veteran infantry (including 500 officers), all his artillery, and many arms. He lacked the resources to create an army of such quality again, and after Naseby, it simply remained for the Parliamentarian armies to wipe out the last pockets of Royalist resistance. Charles hoped to rebuild his army with new recruits from Wales and the border counties and headed in that direction. He also had expectations that reinforcements might arrive from Ireland. The Committee of Both Kingdoms responded on 28 June by ordering Leven's Scottish Covenanters to move to strike at the Royalist stronghold of Hereford. The ensuing Siege of Hereford by Covenanter forces ended in failure, but in December of the same year, Hereford was seized by John Birch in a surprise attack.

The Parliamentarians had also captured the King's personal baggage, with correspondence which showed he intended to seek support from the Irish Catholic Confederation through the Cessation Treaty, and Catholic nations in Europe. By publishing this correspondence, entitled The King's Cabinet Opened, Parliament gained much support in favour of fighting the war to a finish. Within a year, the first civil war ended in a Parliamentarian military victory.

== See also ==
- A Commonwealth of England Navy ship, Naseby, was named after the battle.
- Wars of the Three Kingdoms
