= Maurice of the Palatinate =

Royalist of the English Civil War

Prince Maurice
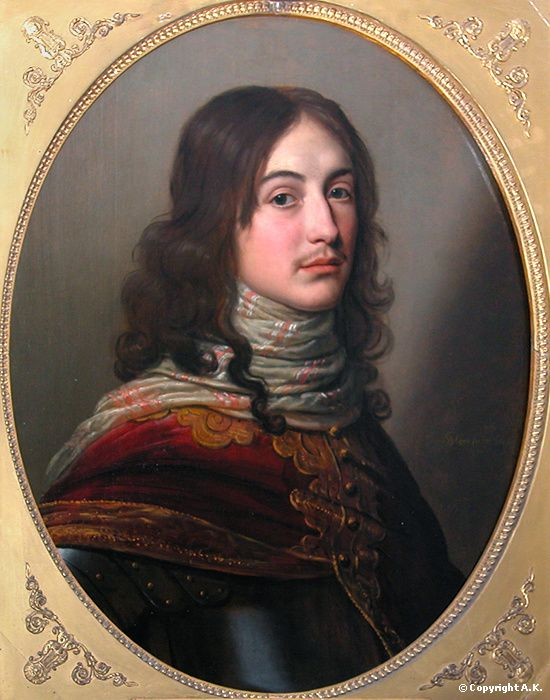
- Prince Maurice von Simmern by unknown painter
- Born: 16 January 1621 n.s. Küstrin Castle, Küstrin, Brandenburg
- Died: 1 September 1652 (aged 31) off the Virgin Islands
- House: Palatinate-Simmern
- Father: Frederick V, Elector Palatine
- Mother: Elizabeth Stuart
- Occupation: Soldier, Royalist Army officer, privateer

Maurice, Prince Palatine of the Rhine KG (16 January 1621 – 1 September 1652) was the fourth son of Frederick V, Elector Palatine and Princess Elizabeth, daughter of King James VI and I and Anne of Denmark.

== Life ==
Maurice was present with his elder brother, Rupert, at the siege of Breda in 1637. He then accompanied Rupert, to support their uncle Charles I in the English Civil War in 1642. Maurice served under Rupert with the cavalry at the Battle of Powick Bridge, where he was wounded, and the Battle of Edgehill. He accompanied his uncle Charles in the occupation of Oxford on 29 October 1642. He commanded the army in Gloucestershire which engaged Sir William Waller in several battles in 1643, including the victory of Ripple Field (13 April), culminating in the Royalist victory at the Battle of Roundway Down (13 July). By 1644, Maurice was appointed lieutenant-general south of the Thames, assuming command of the army in Cornwall and spending the rest of the year campaigning there. He also led his army into Dartmouth during the English Civil War and stayed until the town surrendered. He based himself and his army at Milton Farm on the outskirts of the town and the town mayor at the time reported large quantities of claret and beer being requested on the evening of their victory.

Maurice besieged Lyme Regis in April 1644, but he was compelled to end the siege in June, at great cost to his military standing. At the Battle of Lostwithiel and the Second Battle of Newbury, he participated as a subordinate; at the Battle of Naseby, he fought under Rupert's command.

Maurice attempted to defend Rupert's surrender of Bristol in 1645 to Charles. While unsuccessful, he did not share in Rupert's disgrace. Banished with Rupert in October 1646, he served with the French army in Flanders, but rejoined Rupert in 1648 as vice-admiral of his fleet. In 1649, while in exile, Maurice was made a Knight of the Garter. In 1652, while sailing for the West Indies, he was caught in a hurricane near the Virgin Islands and went down with his flagship, HMS Defiance.

== Sources ==
- Arnold-Baker, Charles (2015). von Blumenthal, Henry (ed.). The Companion to British History. Routledge.
- Cust, Richard (2013). Charles I and the Aristocracy, 1625-1642. Cambridge University Press.
- McIntyre, James R. (2014). "Maurice, Prince Palatine of the Rhine (1621–1652)". In Zabecki, David T. (ed.). Germany at War: 400 Years of Military History. Vol. 2. ABC-CLIO. pp. 836–837.
- Wilson, Derek (1999). The King and the Gentleman. St. Martin's Press.
- Wroughton, John (2006). The Routledge Companion to the Stuart Age, 1603-1714. Routledge.
- Young, Peter; Emberton, Wilfrid (2015). The Cavalier Army. Routledge.
