= Battle of St Neots (1648) =

Skirmish during the Second English Civil War

- Part of the Second English Civil War
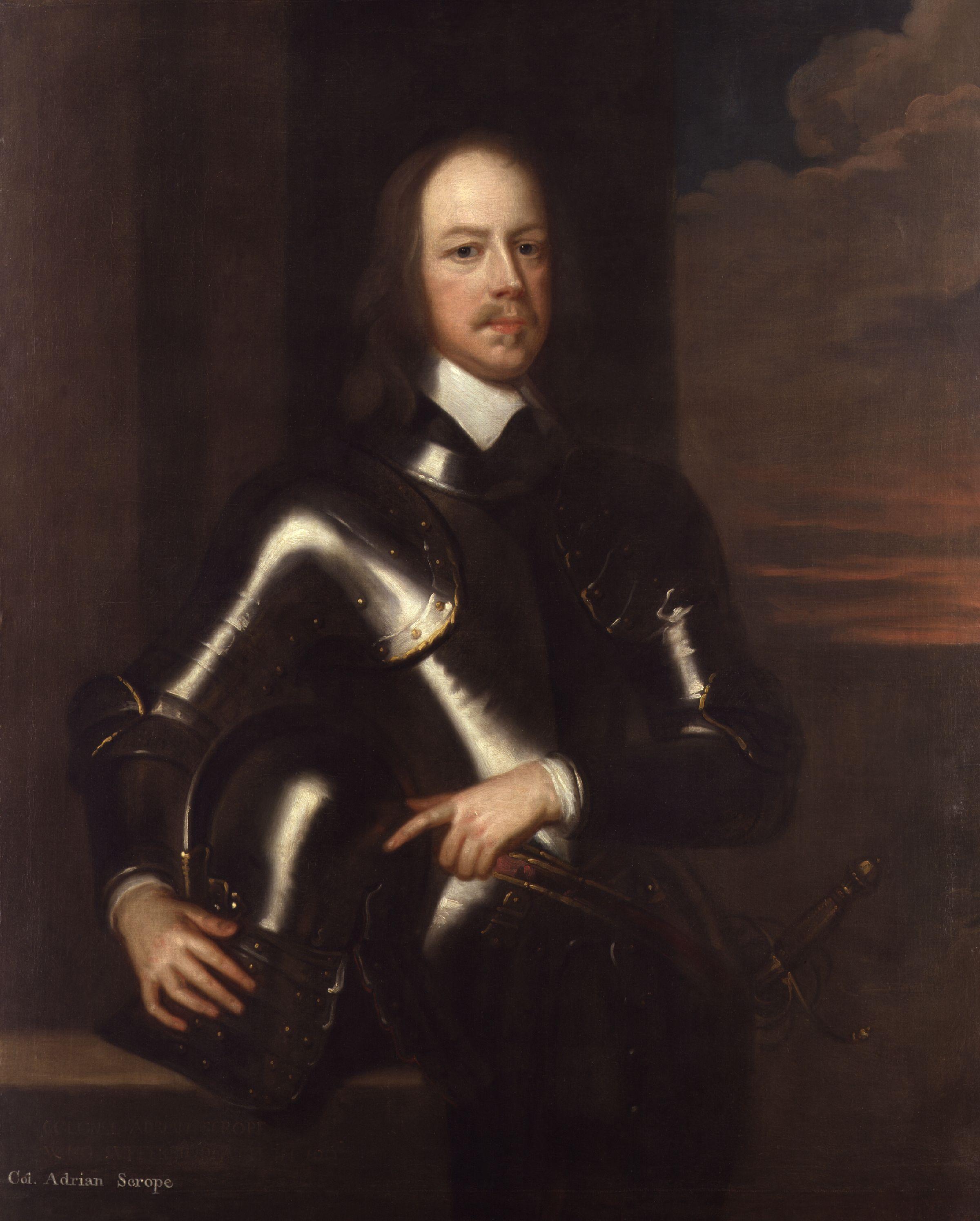
- Colonel Adrian Scrope, Parliamentarian commander
Date	10 July 1648
Location	St Neots Cambridgeshire
Result	Parliamentarian victory

Belligerents
Royalists	(Kingdom of England) Parliamentarians

Commanders and leaders
Earl of Holland (POW); Colonel John Dalbier †	Colonel Adrian Scrope

Strength
100 to 200 (estimate)	100

Casualties and losses
12 killed or wounded	Minimal

The Battle of St Neots on 10 July 1648 was a skirmish during the Second English Civil War at St Neots in Cambridgeshire. A Royalist force led by the Earl of Holland and Colonel John Dalbier was defeated by 100 veteran troops from the New Model Army, commanded by Colonel Adrian Scrope.

Taken by surprise in the early hours, the Royalists were quickly overpowered; Dalbier and several others were killed, while Holland was taken prisoner and executed for treason on 9 March 1649. Although a relatively minor action, Parliamentarian troops were struggling to deal with a series of local risings and victory ensured there was no central focus for Royalist groups in the East Midlands.

== Background ==
When the First English Civil War ended with Royalist defeat in May 1646, most Parliamentarians assumed Charles I would be forced to agree significant political concessions. This proved a fundamental misunderstanding of his character and for the next two years he refused to comply. Parliament went to war in 1642 to curb the power of the monarchy, not remove it, and despite their religious differences, the vast majority of Puritans viewed monarchy as divinely ordered.

Second Civil War; Southern England

This made Charles essential to a settlement, while his opponents were deeply divided between moderates who dominated Parliament and radicals within the New Model Army. In April 1648, his Scottish supporters gained a majority in the Parliament of Scotland and agreed to restore him to the English throne. This put the pieces in place for a rising by Scots and English Royalists, supported by some English Presbyterians, and Scots Covenanters.

When the Second English Civil War began in April 1648, the plan was to tie down the New Model with co-ordinated risings in South Wales and England, allowing time for the Scottish army to invade. By the end of June, the revolts in Wales and Kent had been suppressed, while a Royalist garrison in Colchester was besieged by the New Model under Sir Thomas Fairfax. On 4 July, a petition was presented to Parliament demanding the resumption of negotiations with Charles; on the same day, 400 cavalry were raised by the Earl of Holland and George Villiers, 2nd Duke of Buckingham in an attempt to seize London.

This was insufficient for the task and when the Royalists retreated through Surrey towards Reigate, they were scattered outside Surbiton by Sir Michael Livesey, Buckingham's younger brother Francis being one of the few casualties. Most of the Royalists deserted but Holland reached St Neots on Sunday 9 July, along with 100 to 200 men and Colonel John Dalbier, an experienced German mercenary who fought for Parliament during the First Civil War. At the same time, Fairfax detached 100 veteran cavalry under Colonel Adrian Scrope to prevent them establishing a hub for attracting Royalist supporters in the East Midlands.

== Battle ==
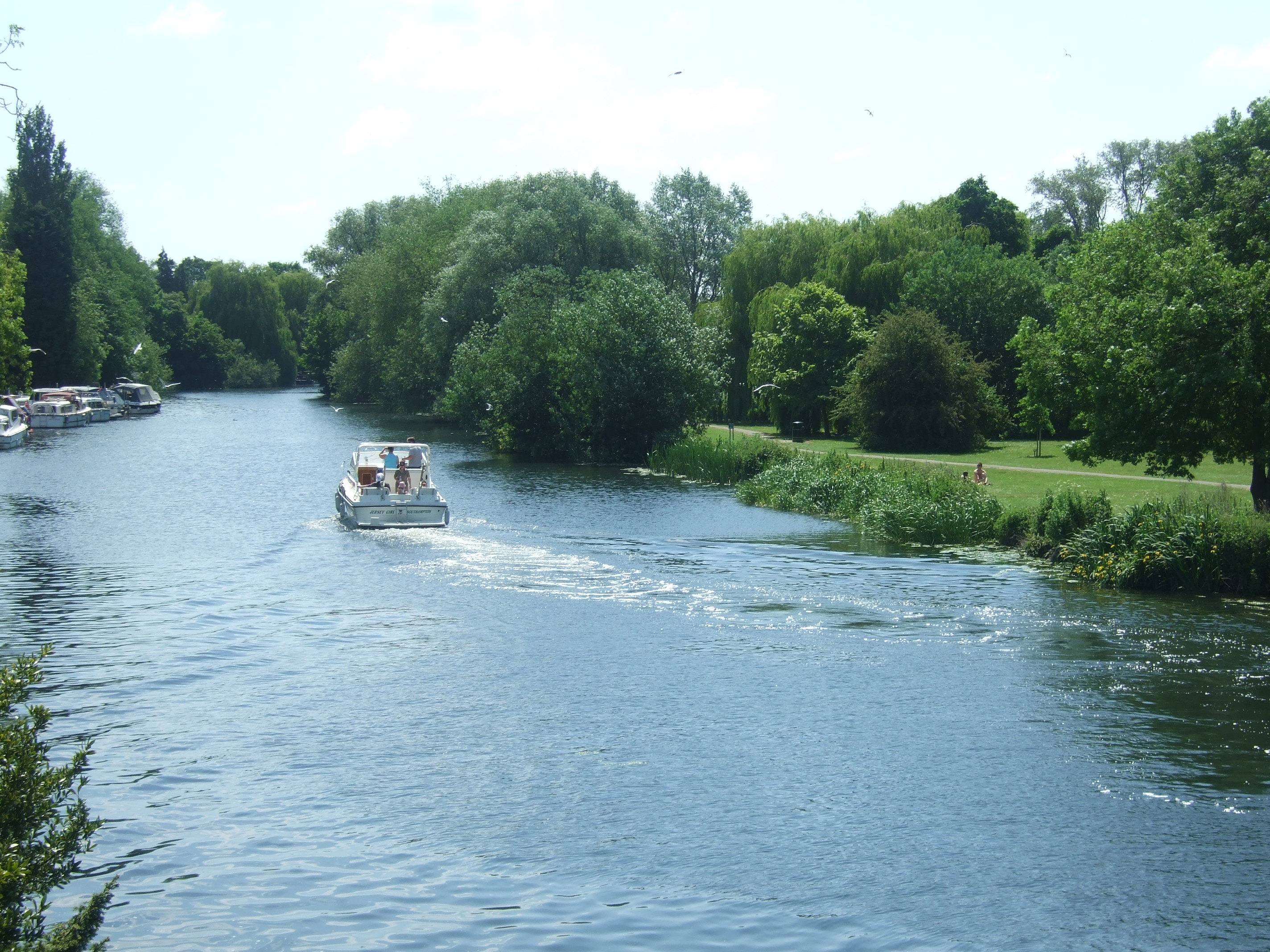
River Great Ouse, at St Neots; several Royalists drowned trying to swim across it

The Royalists were weary, hungry and demoralised; a few men under Dalbier guarded the bridge into the town while their comrades rested. At 2.00 am on 10 July, they were assaulted by Scrope's men and Dalbier was killed in the early stages, although some reports suggest he died of wounds later in the day.

The skirmish was fiercely fought but the Royalists were taken by surprise and quickly overwhelmed. Holland was captured at an inn in the centre of town, while Buckingham managed to escape and eventually made his way to France; in addition to Dalbier, five others were killed including the eldest son of Kenelm Digby, a senior advisor to Charles I, who drowned with two others trying to swim across the River Great Ouse.

== Aftermath ==
Holland was taken to Windsor Castle, where he was held for the next six months; the Second Civil War ended after the Scots were defeated at Battle of Preston in August. Although Scrope had promised to spare his life, Holland had already narrowly escaped being tried for treason by Parliament after defecting to the Royalists in 1643, then returning.

Attitudes had hardened, particularly towards those previously pardoned; in December, moderates were removed from Parliament by Pride's Purge, leading to the Execution of Charles I on 30 January 1649. Holland was tried for treason on 27 February and was executed on 9 March along with Lord Capell and the Duke of Hamilton, captured at Preston.

== Sources ==
- Clarendon, Earl of (1704). The History of the Rebellion and Civil Wars in England; Volume VI (2019 ed.). Wentworth Press. ISBN 978-0469445765.
- Macleod, Donald (Autumn 2009). "The influence of Calvinism on politics" (PDF). Theology in Scotland. XVI (2).
- Palmer, William (1982). "Oliver St. John and the Middle Group in the Long Parliament, 1643–1645: A Reappraisal". Albion: A Quarterly Journal Concerned with British Studies. 14 (1): 20–26. doi:10.2307/4048483. JSTOR 4048483.
- Porter, Stephen (2004). "Dalbier, John (d. 1648)". Oxford Dictionary of National Biography (online ed.). Oxford University Press. doi:10.1093/ref:odnb/7010. (Subscription, Wikipedia Library access or UK public library membership required.)
- Royle, Trevor (2004). Civil War: The Wars of the Three Kingdoms 1638–1660. Abacus. ISBN 978-0-349-11564-1.
- Wedgwood, C.V. (1958). The King's War, 1641–1647 (1983 ed.). Penguin Classics. ISBN 978-0-14-006991-4.
- "1648: The Battle of St. Neots". Cambridge Military History. 7 October 2024.
