= Michael Biddulph (died 1666) =

English politician (1610–1666)

Michael Biddulph (1610–1666) was an English politician who sat in the House of Commons in 1660.

Biddulph was the eldest son of Michael Biddulph of Elmhurst, Staffordshire, and his wife Elizabeth, daughter of Sir William Skeffington and was baptised on 6 November 1610. He was a soldier, serving as a captain in Ireland in 1640, when according to William Dugdale the burgesses of Lichfield wanted him to represent them in parliament. At the outbreak of English Civil War he accompanied Dugdale to Highworth, Wiltshire, seeking a commission from his mother's uncle Sir Edward Dering, 1st Baronet who was raising a royalist regiment. However, he was recalled by his family, who supported the parliamentary cause.

In 1660, Biddulph was elected Member of Parliament for Lichfield in the Convention Parliament.

Biddulph died unmarried at the age of 55 and was buried at Stowe on 3 November 1666.
