= William Balfour (general) =

Scottish-born professional soldier

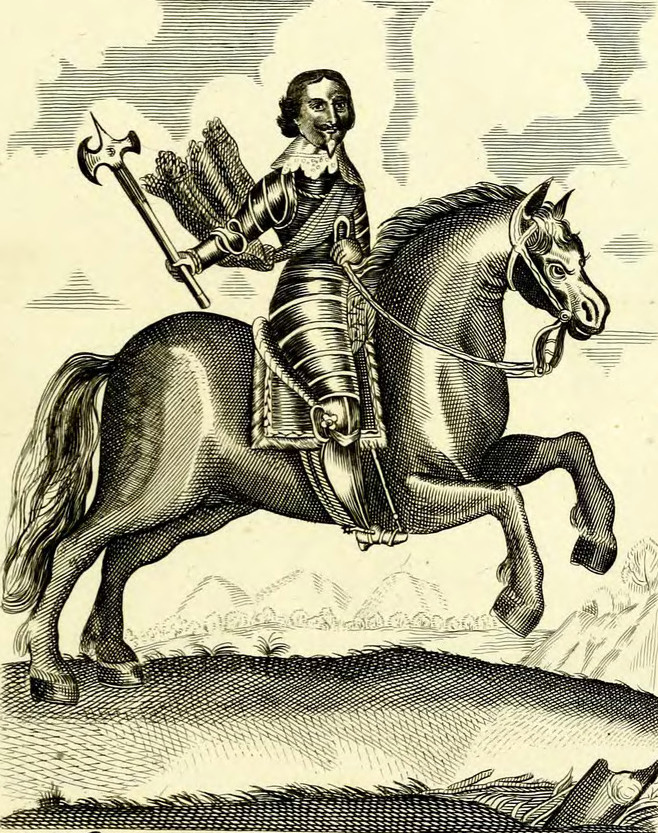
- Born: 1570s
- Died: 1660
- Spouse(s): Helen Napier, Isabella van Weede
- Children: 7
- Parent(s): Henry Balfour; Christiane Cant

Sir William Balfour of Pitcullo (c. 1578 – buried 28 July 1660) was a Scottish-born professional soldier who served in the Thirty Years War and with Parliamentarian forces during the War of the Three Kingdoms.

== Biography ==
Balfour was a member of the prominent Balfours of Pitcullo, Fife, the son of Colonel Henry Balfour (died 1580), and his wife, Christian Cant. He entered Dutch service in the Dutch States Army during the Thirty Years' War fighting with the Scottish brigade until 1627. In that year he became lieutenant-colonel in the Earl of Morton's regiment, took part in the expedition to the isle of Rhé to relieve the Siege of La Rochelle, and was noticed as being one of the officers most favoured by the Duke of Buckingham.

In January 1628, he was charged by Charles I, in conjunction with Colonel Dalbier, to raise 1,000 horse in Friesland, but the suspicions this project aroused in the House of Commons of England obliged the king to abandon the plan, and to assure the house that these troops were never meant to be employed in England. On the death of Sir Allen Apsley in 1630, Sir William, who is described as one of the gentlemen of the king's privy chamber, was appointed Lieutenant of the Tower of London.

In October 1631 he was employed on a confidential mission to the Netherlands. He also received many other marks of the king's favour, including the grant in 1633 of a lucrative patent for making gold and silver money in the Tower. Nevertheless, Balfour, "from the beginning of the Long parliament, according to the natural custom of his country, forgot all his obligations to the king, and made himself very gracious to those people whose glory it was to be thought enemies of the court". Perhaps religious motives had something to do with this change of parties, for Balfour was a devout Presbyterian and a violent opponent of popery (as Roman Catholicism was called in England at the time), and had once beaten a priest for trying to convert his wife.

Strafford was entrusted to Balfour's keeping, and though offered £20,000 and an advantageous match for his daughter, he refused to connive at the earl's escape, or to admit Captain Billingsley and his suspicious levies to the Tower. The King, therefore, persuaded or obliged Balfour to resign his post in December 1641. The accounts given of the causes of this resignation differ considerably.

When the parliament raised an army Sir William was appointed lieutenant-general of the horse, under the nominal command of the Earl of Bedford. He commanded the reserve at the Battle of Edgehill, broke several regiments of the king's foot, and captured part of his artillery. Ludlow describes him spiking the king's guns with his own hands, and all accounts agree in praise of his services. He did not take part in the First Battle of Newbury, having gone abroad to try the waters on account of his health. In the spring of 1644 he was detached from the army of Essex with 1,000 horse to reinforce Waller, and shared the command at the victory of New Alresford. His letter of 30 March 1644 to Essex, relating the battle, was ordered to be printed. He then rejoined Essex, accompanied him into Cornwall, and took Weymouth and Taunton (June 1644). When the infantry was forced to surrender, he broke through the king's lines, and "by an orderly and well-governed march passed above 100 miles in the king's quarters", and succeeded in joining General Middleton.

At the Second Battle of Newbury he commanded the right wing of the parliamentary horse. This was Balfour's last public exploit; with the organisation of the New Model Army he retired from military service. The House of Commons appointed a committee "to consider of a fit recompense and acknowledgment of the faithful services done by him to the public" (21 January 1645), and the House of Lords voted the payment of his arrears (£7,000) and specially recommended him to the Commons (21 July). But some intercepted correspondence seems to have awakened suspicions and caused delays in this payment.

He was buried at Church of St Margaret, Westminster Abbey on 28 July 1660.

== See also ==
- Scotland and the Thirty Years' War
