= Second Battle of Newbury =

1644 battle of the First English Civil War

Coordinates: 51.414°N 1.335°W

- Part of First English Civil War
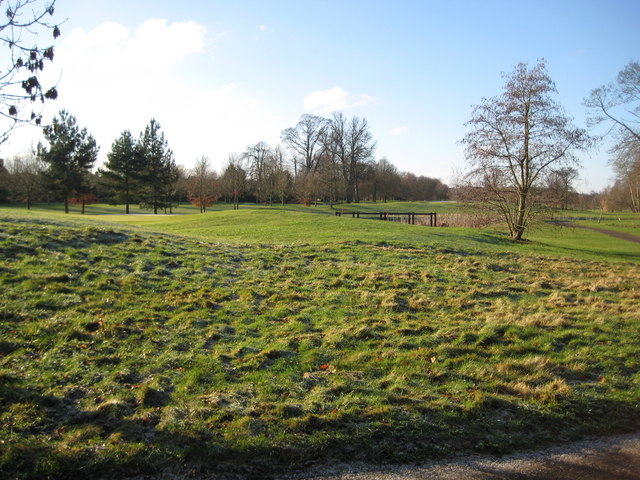
- Site of the battle, now Donnington Grove Country Club
Date	27 October 1644
Location	Newbury, Berkshire
Result	Indecisive

Belligerents
Royalists	Parliamentarians

Commanders and leaders
Charles I Prince Maurice	Earl of Essex; Earl of Manchester; Sir William Waller

Strength
8,500 (Note: 3,500 cavalry 5,000 infantry)	19,000 (Note: 7,000 cavalry 12,000 infantry)

Casualties and losses
1,500	2,000

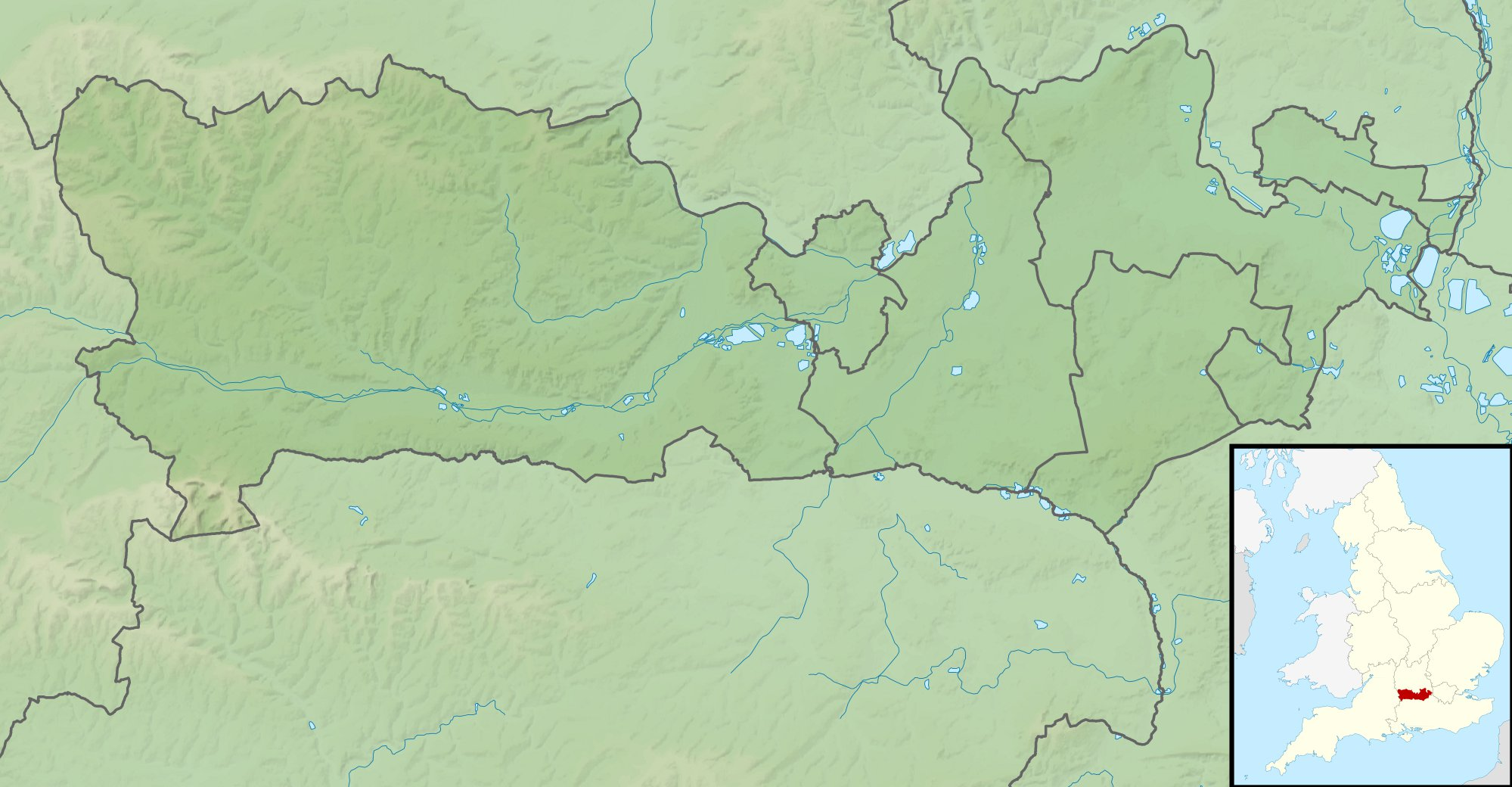
Berkshire

The Second Battle of Newbury was a battle of the First English Civil War fought on 27 October 1644, in Speen, adjoining Newbury in Berkshire. The battle was fought close to the site of the First Battle of Newbury, which took place in late September the previous year.

The battle ended indecisively, the Parliamentarian army, commanded by Sir William Waller and the Earl of Manchester, attempted to trap the royalist forces in a pincer by attacking both sides of Charles' army simultaneously. The Parliamentarian attacks were repulsed by the Royal army. Charles however realised following the battle, his position had been rendered untenable and withdrew towards Oxford during the night. The exhausted Parliamentarian army was unable to block the royalist retreat and Charles was able to leave unmolested, despite being heavily outnumbered.

The tactical failures in the command and control of the Parliamentarian army during this battle led to several major military reforms that resulted in the creation of the New Model Army for Parliament the following year.

== Background ==
In the early months of 1644, the Parliamentarians had won victories at Cheriton in the south of England and Nantwich in the northwest. Also, they had secured the allegiance of the Scottish Covenanters, who sent an army into the north east. These developments both distracted the Royalists and weakened their forces around Oxford, King Charles's wartime capital.

Early in June, the Parliamentarian armies of the Earl of Essex and Sir William Waller threatened to surround Oxford. King Charles made a night march to escape to Worcester. He was still in danger but on 6 June, Essex and Waller (who disliked each other) conferred at Stow-on-the-Wold and fatally decided to divide their armies. While Waller continued to shadow the King, Essex marched into the West Country, to relieve Lyme which was under siege, and then to subdue Devon and Cornwall.

This allowed the King to double back and return to Oxford to collect reinforcements. On 29 June, he then won a victory over Waller at Cropredy Bridge. Waller's army, most of which was unwilling to serve far from its home areas in London and the southeast, was subsequently crippled for several weeks by desertions and threatened mutinies. The King was thus free to march after Essex's army.

Essex was soon trapped against the coast at Lostwithiel. He relied on support from the Parliamentarian navy, but contrary winds prevented the Parliamentarian ships leaving Portsmouth. Although Essex himself escaped in a fishing boat and his cavalry broke out of encirclement, the rest of his army was forced to surrender on 2 September, losing their arms and equipment. The troops were paroled, but suffered severely from exposure and attacks by country people during their march to Portsmouth. Although they were re-equipped, only 3,000 infantry (out of the 6,000 who started) were fit for service.

== Campaign ==
After the victory at Lostwithiel, King Charles first probed the Parliamentarian defences at Plymouth then marched back across the southern counties of England to relieve several garrisons (including Banbury, Basing House and Donnington Castle, near Newbury), which had been isolated while he had been campaigning in the west. King Charles was joined briefly by Prince Rupert, who had been defeated at the Battle of Marston Moor in northern England on 2 July. The King ordered Rupert to march into Gloucestershire in an attempt to draw some of the Parliamentarian armies after him. However, the Parliamentarians did not send any units to follow Rupert, and his manoeuvre divided the Royalist forces, rather than those of Parliament.

By the time that King Charles arrived in Berkshire with his army, the Earl of Essex had assembled three Parliamentarian armies and positioned them to block any Royalist advance on London. By 19 October Waller was at Basingstoke where he was joined by the Earl of Manchester with the Eastern Association army the next day. The Earl of Essex also arrived at Basingstoke on 20 October with an army composed largely of elements of the cavalry and infantry that had survived the battle at Lostwithiel.

On 22 October, Charles relieved Donnington Castle. He knighted Lieutenant Colonel John Boys, the commander of its garrison, and promoted him to colonel. He hoped to relieve Basing House next, but the combined Parliamentarian armies were too strong for him to risk an advance. He therefore waited around Newbury for Rupert, and another detachment under the Earl of Northampton which had been sent to relieve Banbury, to rejoin him.

== Dispositions and plans ==
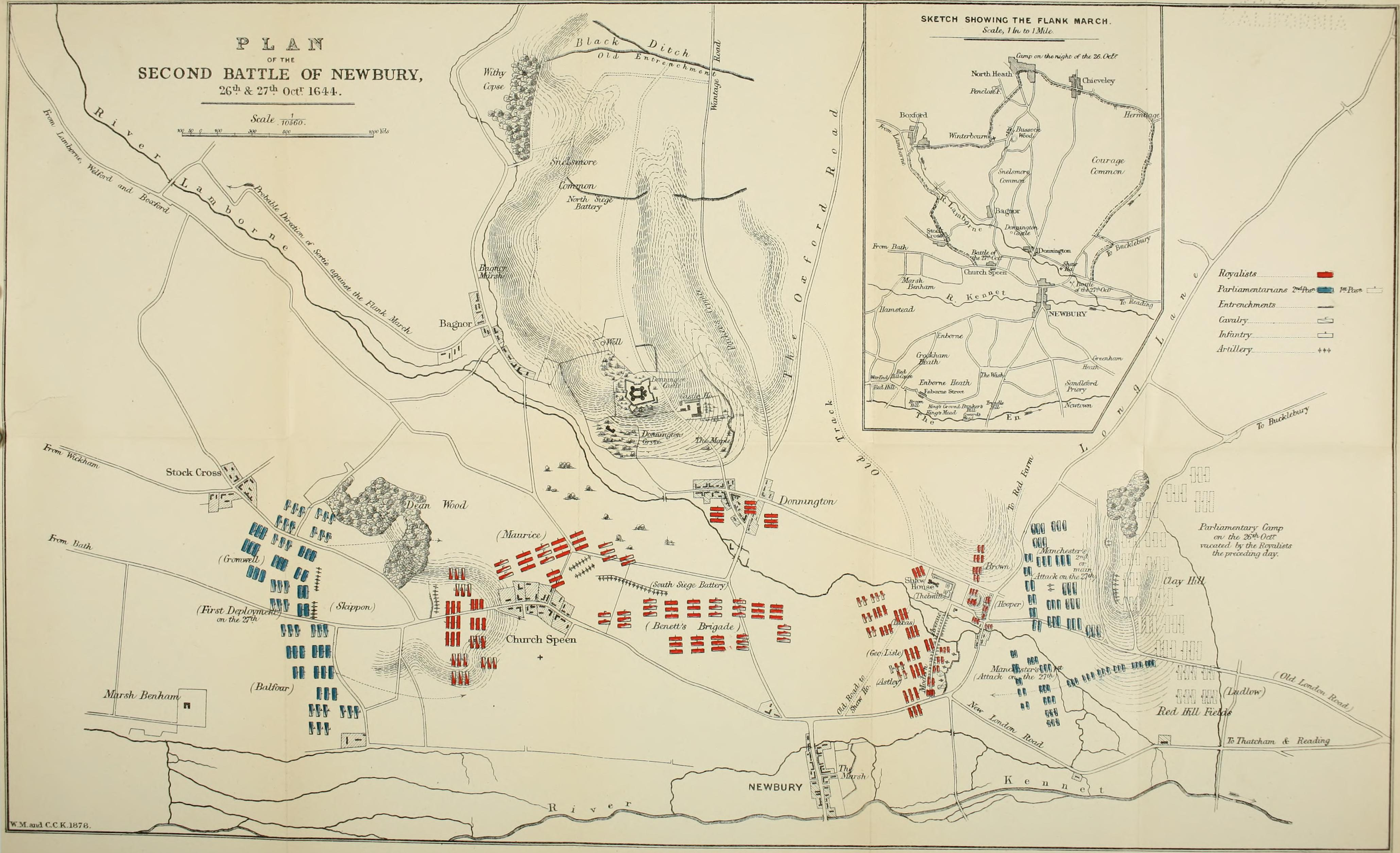
Plan of the battle

Charles' army held three strong points: Donnington Castle north of Newbury, Shaw House northeast of the town and the village of Speen to the west. The River Kennet prevented the Parliamentarians making any outflanking move to the south, but the small River Lambourn divided the Royalists at Speen and Newbury from those at Shaw House and Donnington Castle.

Shaw House and its grounds including some Iron Age embankments incorporated into the defences, were defended by Lord Astley, with three "tertias" or brigades of infantry under his son, Sir Bernard Astley, Colonel Thomas Blagge and Colonel George Lisle. Speen was held by Rupert's brother Prince Maurice, with a mixed detachment from the Royalist forces from the west country. Charles's cavalry under George, Lord Goring were in reserve. They were divided into four brigades under Goring himself, Lord Wentworth, the Earl of Cleveland and Sir Humphrey Bennett. The Earl of Brentford was the Lord General, and Charles' deputy Lord Hopton commanded the artillery.

Early on 26 October, the combined Parliamentarian armies advanced to Clay Hill, a few miles east of Newbury, where they set up an artillery battery. Intermittent exchanges of cannon fire took place throughout the day. Essex had been taken ill, and Waller and Manchester decided that a frontal attack on Donnington Castle and Shaw House would be too costly. They opted instead to divide their forces. While Manchester demonstrated with 7,000 infantry against Shaw House, Waller took 12,000 men (including the infantry from the Earl of Essex's army, a brigade of the London Trained Bands and most of the cavalry) on a long march of 13 miles (21 km) around the Royalist position to fall on Speen from the west. It was intended that on hearing the opening cannonade from Waller's guns, Manchester would then put in a full-scale attack on Shaw House.

== Battle ==
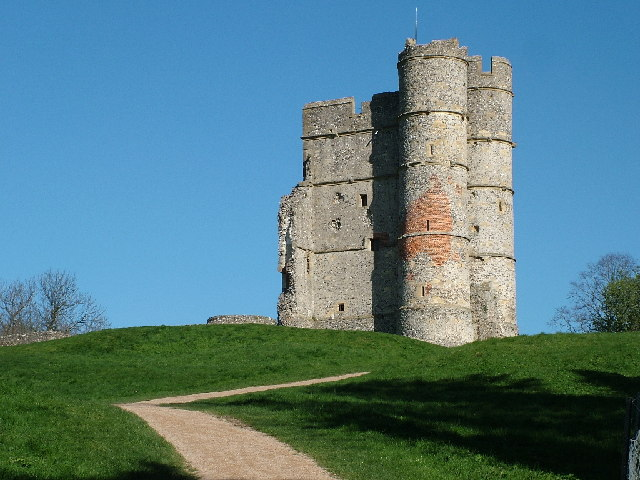
The ruins of Donnington Castle

Waller set off late on 26 October and camped overnight far to the north. His force broke camp and resumed its outflanking move on 27 October while Manchester launched a diversionary attack on Shaw House. Although the Royalists at Donnington Castle observed Waller's movement, and even sent a small detachment of cavalry to harry his rearguard, the troops at Speen were not warned of the danger. Waller's force crossed to the south bank of the Lambourn at Boxford, and formed up and attacked at 3 o'clock in the afternoon, with cavalry under Oliver Cromwell on the left flank, infantry under Philip Skippon in the centre and cavalry under Sir William Balfour on the right.

Maurice's forces had been dispersed to forage, and were caught unprepared. Although they repelled the first attack on Speen, the Parliamentarian infantry rallied and stormed the village, capturing several cannon (including some which the Royalists had captured at Lostwithiel). Balfour routed Maurice's cavalry and also defeated the Earl of Cleveland's brigade, but was then checked by the fresh Queen's Regiment of horse and musketeers under Sir Thomas Blagge lining hedges east of Speen. Cromwell was uncharacteristically slow in coming into action and his wing was thrown back by a charge by Goring's remaining cavalry under Goring himself.

The Earl of Manchester was slow to throw in his own attack, pleading that the noise of Waller's guns had not been heard over the exchanges of artillery fire at Shaw House. Just before dark, he made a determined attack on Shaw House, but was beaten back.

Casualties in the day's fighting were heavy, but roughly even on both sides.

== Aftermath ==
The Royalists had held off the Parliamentarian forces but Charles knew his army was not up to another day's fighting. He was outnumbered and with the loss of Speen, his forces were vulnerable to another attack the next morning. He hastily retreated to the north, leaving his wounded and most of his guns and baggage in Donnington Castle. Much of the Royalist army withdrew over a bridge over the River Lambourne which was an obvious line of retreat, but no Parliamentarian troops blocked their path, and the Royalists were free to withdraw.

The following day, the Parliamentarian commanders held a council of war at Speen. Cromwell, Balfour and Sir Arthur Hesilrige eventually were allowed to take cavalry in pursuit of the King's army, but soon found that the Royalists had already crossed the River Thames at Wallingford and had reached the safety of the neighbourhood of Oxford. The Parliamentarians called off the pursuit and instead made a hasty attack on Donnington Castle. The attack was defeated with heavy casualties.

By 1 November, Charles had been reinforced by Rupert, Northampton and other forces to a strength of 15,000 men, and was able to relieve Donnington Castle again on 9 November. The Parliamentarians declined to contest the second relief of Donnington, and the Royalists found on 19 November that they had also raised the siege of Basing House. Charles thus ended the campaigning season with a notable success.

The Parliamentarian armies' unwieldy council of war was divided. When the King offered battle on 9 November, Manchester made his famous remark that "The King need not care how oft he fights... If we fight 100 times and beat him 99 he will be King still, but if he beats us but once, or the last time, we shall be hanged, we shall lose our estates, and our posterities be undone." Cromwell, his lieutenant general, made the equally famous rejoinder, "If this be so, why did we take up arms at first? This is against fighting ever hereafter. If so, let us make peace, be it never so base".

The dissatisfaction expressed by Cromwell and other Parliamentarians over the failure to trap Charles after the battle and the subsequent half-hearted operations, eventually resulted in the passing of the Self-denying Ordinance, which deprived Essex, Waller and Manchester of their commands, and the formation of the New Model Army, with which Parliament gained victory the next year.

Newbury was one of the few battles of the English Civil War in which an army attempted a wide outflanking move. Waller and Manchester took a risk in dividing their army, but were aware that they enjoyed superiority of numbers.
