= Michael Biddulph (elder) =

English politician (fl. 1640s)

Michael Biddulph (c1580-1658) of Elmhurst, Staffordshire, was an English Member of Parliament (MP).

He was the son of Simon Biddulph (d. 1632) of Elmhurst and Joyce, daughter of Richard Floyer of Uttoxeter, Staffordshire. He matriculated at Trinity College, Oxford in May 1598 and was admitted to the Middle Temple in August 1599. He married Elizabeth (d. 1657), daughter of Sir William Skeffington of Fisherwick, their first son being baptized in July 1606.

During the Civil Wars Biddulph was active in the administration of Staffordshire for Parliament and in 1646 was selected to replace Sir Richard Cave as Member of the Parliament of England for Lichfield and sat until removed by Pride's Purge.

He died in January 1658 and was buried with his wife in St Chad's, Lichfield.

Biddulph and Elizabeth had 6 sons and 4 daughters, including:

- Michael Biddulph (died 1666)
- Sir Theophilus Biddulph, 1st Baronet
- Richard (left an annuity in his will)
- William (left an annuity in his will)
- Elizabeth married Richard Brandreth of Shenstone, Staffordshire
- Maria married John Palmer of Temple, Leicestershire
- Anne married Robert Berkenhead of London
- Joyce (left his 'house lately builded' in Sadlers Street, Lichfield in his will).
