= Self-denying Ordinance =

- Parliament of England
- Long title: An Ordinance of the Lords and Commons assembled in Parliament, for the discharging of the Members of both Houses from all offices, both military and civil
- Introduced by: Sir Henry Vane

Dates
- Commencement: 3 April 1645

Status: Revoked

The Self-denying Ordinance was passed by the English Parliament on 3 April 1645. (Note: After March 1642, all Parliamentary bills that became law were styled "Ordinance", since Charles I refused the royal assent required to make them 'Acts'.) All members of the House of Commons or Lords who were also officers in the Parliamentary army or navy were required to resign one or the other, within 40 days from 3 April 1645.

It was part of a set of reforms designed to ensure victory, another being the establishment of a professional, centrally-controlled New Model Army, which replaced the existing system of regional armies. It was also linked to an internal political struggle between a Peace Party, who wanted a negotiated settlement with King Charles, and a War Party which wanted to dictate terms.

First introduced in December 1644, the bill passed at the second attempt. As members of the Lords could not resign their titles, it effectively removed aristocratic commanders like the Earls of Manchester and Essex. Under the amended version, they were still required to resign their commissions, but could be re-appointed.

== Political motivation ==
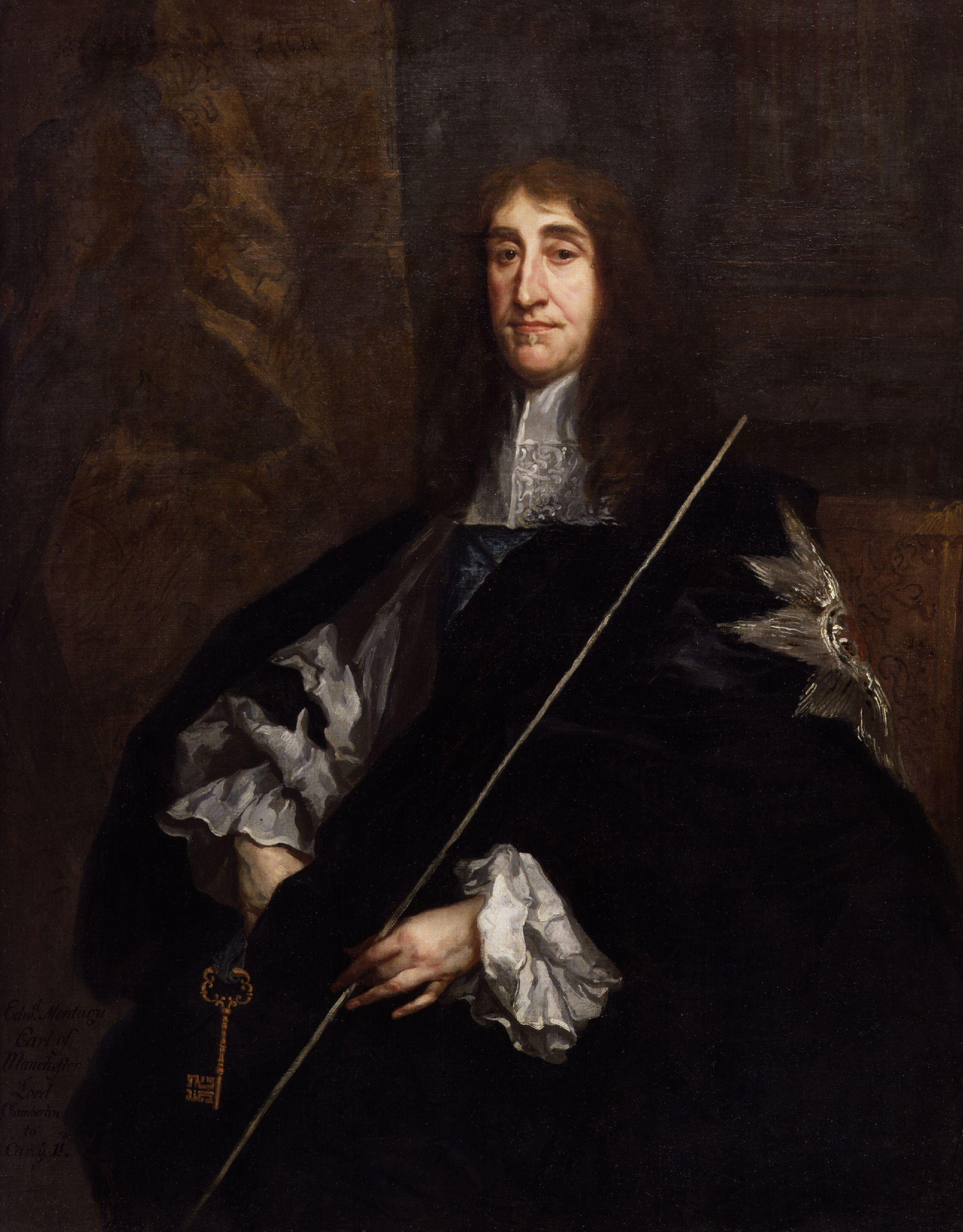
The Earl of Manchester, a leader of the Peace Party

At the outset of the First English Civil War, Parliament gave command of its main armies to members of the aristocracy. This was in accordance with well-established practices of the day, and generalships were accorded to the earls of Manchester and Essex among others. Edward Montagu, Earl of Manchester, was given charge of the Eastern Association, where Cromwell served under him as a cavalry officer.

Parliament was soon hindered by dissension within this military leadership. These officers were not professional soldiers; their experience and skill at warfare varied. More significantly, a faction of them avoided engagements with the Cavalier forces, hoping that reconciliation with King Charles I was still possible. The Earl of Manchester, perhaps the most prominent of these, expressed his pessimism for the war as follows: "If we beat the King ninety and nine times yet he is king still, and so will his posterity be after him; but if the King beat us once, we shall be all hanged, and our posterity be made slaves".

As the war proceeded, it was clear that Essex and Manchester were at best half-hearted in pursuing the fight against the Royalists, an attitude that became ever more apparent as the struggle became more radical. The growing rift between the Lords and the Commons finally came to a point of crisis when the fruits of the great victory at the Battle of Marston Moor were allowed to slip away at the disappointing Second Battle of Newbury. It was after this that the political tensions between Oliver Cromwell and Manchester could no longer be contained by the established forms of command.

Members of Parliament, notably Oliver Cromwell and Sir William Waller, saw the need for radical reform of the army. For Cromwell, this attack on Manchester's conduct ultimately became an attack on the Lords, most of whom held the same views as Manchester, and on the Scots, who attempted to bring Cromwell to trial as an "incendiary". At the height of this bitter controversy, Cromwell suddenly proposed to stifle all animosities by the resignation of all officers who were members of either House. This proposal, in theory, affected himself no less than the Earls of Essex and Manchester.

== Terms of the ordinance ==
The first Self-denying Bill was put before Parliament on 9 December 1644. It provided that "no member of either house shall have or execute any office or command", etc. in the armed forces. One of the exceptions was Oliver Cromwell. It passed the House of Commons on 19 December but was thrown out by the Lords on 13 January 1645. The Lords, naturally, were reluctant to approve an ordinance that would automatically exclude nobles from military command. It also "weeded out" the "half measures men" such as Lords Essex and Manchester.

A second version of the bill was prepared, which required resignations as above, but did not forbid re-appointment of the officers. This bill was agreed to on 3 April 1645.

== Historic significance ==
The Self-denying Ordinance improved military unity by separating the quarrels in Parliament from the immediate operations of command. Leaders from the Presbyterian "peace party" faction in Parliament resigned their military positions to retain their political powers; Lords Manchester and Essex forfeited their generalships, as Lord Warwick did his command of the navy. Leadership of Parliament's troops fell to Sir Thomas Fairfax, then a lieutenant general, who was among the few officers still eligible for the post.

In practical terms, the ordinance solidified the power of Cromwell and his "war party" faction. Cromwell was a member of the House of Commons, so he was obliged to resign his post as well. However, the Committee of Both Kingdoms, which oversaw the war, found his talents as a soldier indispensable. His term in command was extended several times, in forty-day increments, until it was finally made permanent. While this appointment was officially as Fairfax's lieutenant general, Cromwell wielded influence well beyond his rank.

More broadly, this reform helped usher in the New Model Army. This reorganized force, designed for unity and efficiency, incorporated several practices recognizable in modern armies. In addition to a professional officer corps promoted on merit, it replaced the sometimes bulky local units with nationally controlled regiments, standardized training protocols, and ensured regular salary payments to the troops. This army soon turned the war in favour of Parliament, decisively beating the Royalist forces at the battle of Naseby on 14 June 1645.

== Sources ==
- Bucholz, R. O.; Key, Newton (2004). Early Modern England, 1485–1714: A Narrative History. Wiley-Blackwell. p. 243. ISBN 0-631-21393-7.
- Firth, C. H.; Rait, R. S., eds. (1911). Acts and Ordinances of the Interregnum, 1642-1660. pp. III–XXXVIII, 30–43.
- Rushworth. "The Self-denying Ordinance, April 3, 1645". Great Civil War. Vol. ii. pp. 188–191..
