= Battle of Lostwithiel =

Battle in the First English Civil War (1644)

Coordinates: 50.408°N 4.667°W

- Part of the First English Civil War
Date	21 August – 2 September 1644
Location	Near Lostwithiel in Cornwall
Result	Royalist victory

Belligerents
Royalists	Parliamentarians

Commanders and leaders
King Charles I; Earl of Forth; Prince Maurice; Sir Richard Grenville; Lord Goring	Earl of Essex; William Balfour; Philip Skippon (surrendered)

Strength
12,000 infantry 7,000 cavalry	c. 6,500 infantry c. 3,000 cavalry

Casualties and losses
c. 500	c. 700 c. 5,000 prisoners

Cornwall and Lostwithiel

The Battle of Lostwithiel took place over a 13-day period from 21 August to 2 September 1644, around the town of Lostwithiel and along the River Fowey valley in Cornwall during the First English Civil War. A Royalist army led by Charles I of England defeated a Parliamentarian force commanded by the Earl of Essex.

Although Essex and most of the cavalry escaped, between 5,000 and 6,000 Parliamentarian infantry were forced to surrender. Since the Royalists were unable to feed so many, they were given a pass back to their own territory, arriving in Southampton a month later having lost nearly half their number to disease and desertion.

Considered one of the worst defeats suffered by Parliament over the course of the Wars of the Three Kingdoms, it secured South West England for the Royalists until early 1646.

== Background ==
During April and May 1644, Parliamentarian commanders Sir William Waller and the Earl of Essex combined their armies and carried out a campaign against King Charles and the Royalist garrisons surrounding Oxford. Trusting Waller to deal with the King in Oxfordshire, Essex divided the Parliamentarian army on 6 June and headed southwest to relieve the Royalist siege of Lyme in Dorset. Lyme had been under siege by King Charles' nephew, Prince Maurice, and the Royalists for nearly two months.

South-West England at that time was largely under the control of the Royalists. The town of Lyme, however, was a Parliamentarian stronghold and served as an important seaport for the Parliamentarian fleet of the Earl of Warwick. As Essex approached Lyme in mid-June Prince Maurice ended the siege and took his troops west to Exeter.

Essex then proceeded further southwest toward Cornwall with the intent to relieve the siege of Plymouth. Plymouth was the only other significant Parliamentarian stronghold in the South-West and it was under siege by Richard Grenville and Cornish Royalists. Essex had been told by Lord Robartes, a wealthy politician and merchant from Cornwall, that the Parliamentarians would gain considerable military support if he moved against Grenville and freed Plymouth. Given Lord Robartes' advice, Essex advanced toward Plymouth. His action caused Grenville to end the siege. Essex then advanced further west, believing that he could take full control of the South-West from the Royalists.

Meanwhile, in Oxfordshire, King Charles battled with the Parliamentarians and defeated Sir William Waller at the Battle of Cropredy Bridge on 29 June. On 12 July after a Royalist council of war recommended that Essex be dealt with before he could be reinforced, King Charles and his Oxford army departed Evesham. King Charles accepted the council's advice, not solely because it was good strategy, but more so because his Queen was in Exeter, where she had recently given birth to the Princess Henrietta and had been denied safe conduct to Bath by Essex.

== Trapped in Cornwall ==
On 26 July, King Charles arrived in Exeter and joined his Oxford army with the Royalist forces commanded by Prince Maurice. On that same day, Essex and his Parliamentary force entered Cornwall. One week later, as Essex bivouacked with his army at Bodmin, he learned that King Charles had defeated Waller; brought his Oxford army to the South-West; and joined forces with Prince Maurice. Essex had also seen that he was not getting the military support from the people of Cornwall as Lord Robartes asserted. At that time, Essex understood that he and his army were trapped in Cornwall and his only salvation would be reinforcements or an escape through the port of Fowey by means of the Parliamentarian fleet.

Essex immediately marched his troops five miles south to the small town of Lostwithiel arriving on 2 August. He immediately deployed his men in a defensive arc with detachments on the high ground to the north at Restormel Castle and the high ground to the east at Beacon Hill. Essex also sent a small contingent of foot south to secure the port of Fowey aiming to eventually evacuate his infantry by sea. At Essex's disposal was a force of 6,500 foot and 3,000 horse.

Aided through intelligence provided by the people of Cornwall, King Charles followed westward, slowly and deliberately cutting off the potential escape routes that Essex might attempt to utilize. On 6 August King Charles communicated with Essex, calling for him to surrender. Stalling for several days, Essex considered the offer but ultimately refused.

On 11 August, Grenville and the Cornish Royalists entered Bodmin forcing out Essex's rear-guard cavalry. Grenville then proceeded south across Respryn Bridge to meet and join forces with King Charles and Prince Maurice. It is estimated that the Royalist forces at that time were composed of 12,000 foot and 7,000 horse. Over the next two days the Royalists deployed detachments along the east side of the River Fowey to prevent a Parliamentarian escape across country. Finally the Royalists sent 200 foot with artillery south to garrison the fort at Polruan, effectively blocking the entrance to the harbour of Fowey. At about that time, Essex learned that reinforcements under the command of Sir John Middleton were turned back by the Royalists at Bridgwater in Somerset.

== First battle - 21–30 August 1644 ==
At 07:00 hours on 21 August, King Charles launched his first attack on Essex and the Parliamentarians at Lostwithiel. From the north, Grenville and the Cornish Royalists attacked Restormel Castle and easily dislodged the Parliamentarians who fell back quickly. From the east, King Charles and the Oxford army captured Beacon Hill with little resistance from the Parliamentarians. Prince Maurice and his force occupied Druid Hill. Casualties were fairly low and by nightfall the fighting ended and the Royalists held the high ground on the north and east sides of Lostwithiel.

For the next couple of days the two opposing forces exchanged fire only in a number of small skirmishes. On 24 August, King Charles further tightened the noose encircling the Parliamentarians when he sent Lord Goring and Sir Thomas Bassett to secure the town of St Blazey and the area to the southwest of Lostwithiel. This reduced the foraging area for the Parliamentarians and access to the coves and inlets in the vicinity of the port of Par.

Essex and the Parliamentarians were now totally surrounded and boxed into a two-mile by five-mile area spanning from Lostwithiel in the north to the port of Fowey in the south. Knowing that he would not be able to fight his way out, Essex made his final plans for an escape. Since a sea evacuation of his cavalry would not be possible, Essex ordered his cavalry commander William Balfour to attempt a breakout to Plymouth. For the infantry, Essex planned to retreat south and meet Lord Warwick and the Parliamentarian fleet at Fowey. At 03:00 hours on 31 August, Balfour and 2,000 members of his cavalry executed the first step of Essex's plan when they successfully crossed the River Fowey and escaped intact without engaging the Royalist defenders.

== Second battle - 31 August - 2 September 1644 ==
Early on the morning on 31 August, the Parliamentarians ransacked and looted Lostwithiel and began their withdrawal south. At 07:00 hours, the Royalists observed the actions of the Parliamentarians and immediately proceeded to attack. Grenville attacked from the north. King Charles and Prince Maurice crossed the River Fowey, joined up with Grenville, and entered Lostwithiel. Together the Royalists engaged the Parliamentarian rear-guards and quickly took possession of the town. The Royalist also sent detachments down along the east side of the River Fowey to protect against any further breakouts and to capture the town of Polruan.

The Royalists then began to pursue Essex and the Parliamentarian infantry down the river valley. At the outset the Royalists pushed the Parliamentarians nearly three miles south through the hedged fields, hills and valleys. At the narrow pass near St. Veep, Philip Skippon, Essex's commander of the infantry, counter-attacked the Royalists and pushed them back several fields attempting to give Essex time to set up a line of defense further south. At 11:00 hours, the Royalist cavalry mounted a charge and won back the territory lost. There was a lull in the battle at 12:00 hours as King Charles waited for his full army to come up and reform.

The fighting resumed and continued through the afternoon as the Parliamentarians tried to disengage and continue south. At 16:00 hours, the Parliamentarians tried again to counter-attack with their remaining cavalry only to be driven back by King Charles' Life Guard. About a mile north of Castle Dore, the Parliamentarians right flank began to give way. At 18:00 hours when the Parliamentarians were pushed back to Castle Dore they made their last attempt to rally only to be pushed back and surrounded.

About that time the fighting ended with the Royalists satisfied in their accomplishments of the day. Exhausted and discouraged, the Parliamentarians hunkered down for the night. Later that evening under the darkness of night, Essex and his command staff stole away to the seashore where they used a fishing boat to flee to Plymouth, leaving Skippon in command.

Early on 1 September, Skippon met with his officers to inform them about Essex's escape and to discuss alternatives. It was decided that they would approach King Charles and seek terms. Concerned that Parliamentarian reinforcements might be on their way, the King quickly agreed on 2 September to generous terms. The battle was over. Six thousand Parliamentarians were taken as prisoners. Their weapons were taken away and they were marched to Southampton. They suffered the wrath of the Cornish people in route and as many as 3,000 died of exposure and disease along the way. Those that survived the journey were, however, eventually set free. Total casualties associated with the battle were extremely high especially when considering those who died on the march back to Southampton. To those numbers as many as 700 Parliamentarians are estimated to have been killed or wounded during the fighting in Cornwall along with an estimated 500 Royalists.

== Aftermath ==
The Battle of Lostwithiel was a great victory for King Charles and the greatest loss that the Parliamentarians would suffer in the First English Civil War. For King Charles the victory secured the South-West for the remainder of the war and mitigated criticism for a while against the Royalist war effort.

For the Parliamentarians, the defeat resulted in recriminations with Middleton ultimately being blamed for his failure to break through with reinforcements. The Parliamentarian failure at Lostwithiel along with the failure to defeat King Charles at the Second Battle of Newbury ultimately led Parliament to adopt the Self-denying Ordinance and led to the implementation of the New Model Army.

== See also ==
- Battle of Braddock Down which took place in January 1643 a few kilometres from Lostwithiel.
- Cornwall in the English Civil War
