= English Civil War (disambiguation) =

The English Civil War was fought between the Royalists (Cavaliers) and Parliamentarians (Roundheads) between 1642 and 1651.

English Civil War may also refer to:

== Military conflict ==
- First English Civil War (1642–1646)
  - First English Civil War, 1642
  - First English Civil War, 1643
  - First English Civil War, 1644
  - First English Civil War, 1645
  - First English Civil War, 1646
- Second English Civil War (1648–49)
- Third English Civil War (1649–1651)

== Other uses ==
- "English Civil War" (song), a 1979 song by The Clash

== See also ==
- English War (disambiguation)
- List of English civil wars
- List of wars involving England
