= History of Oxfordshire =

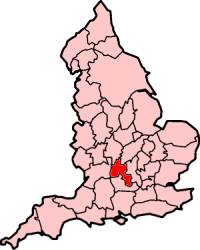
Ancient extent of Oxfordshire

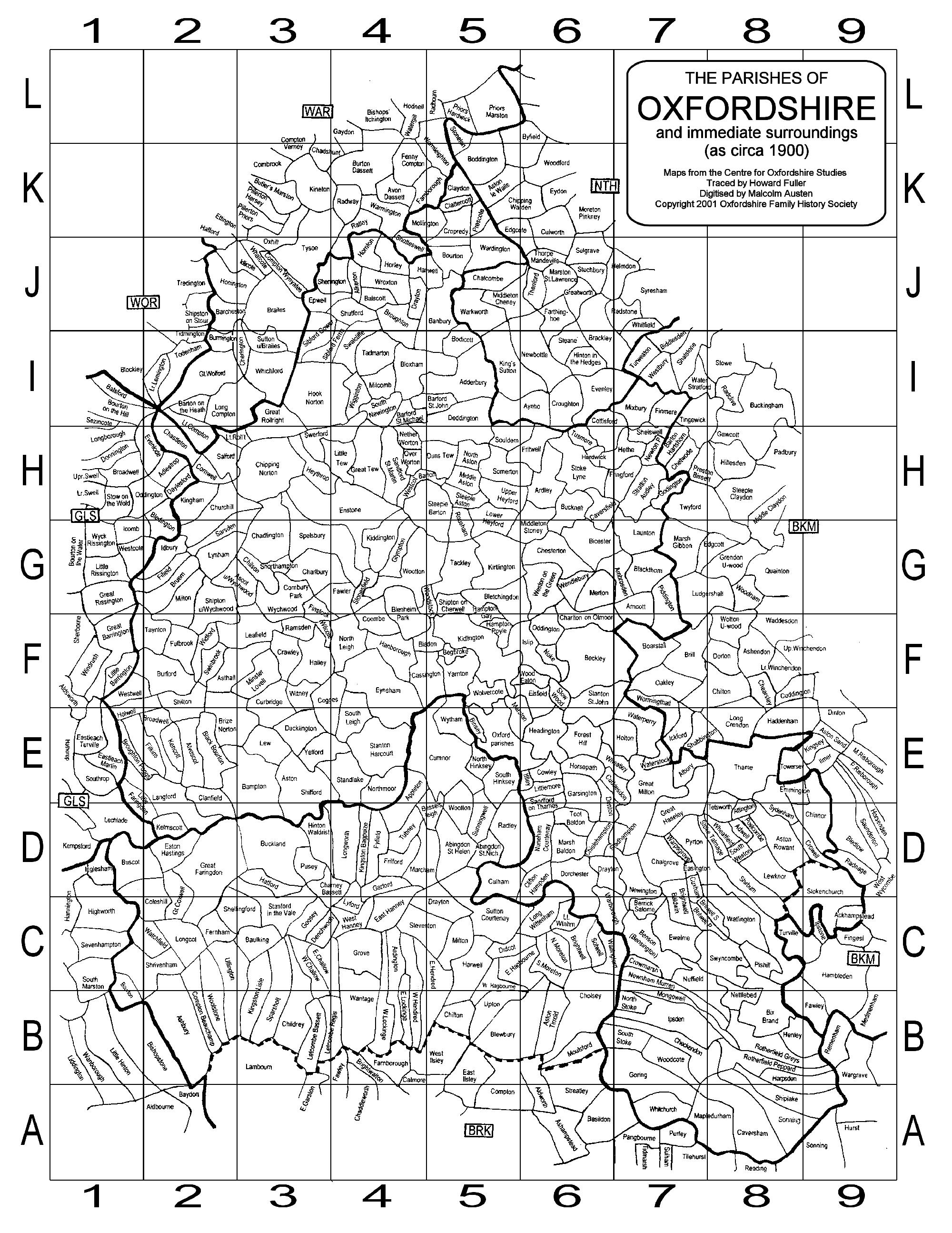
Map showing the parishes of Oxfordshire, c. 1900

The county of Oxfordshire in England is broadly situated in the land between the River Thames to the south, the Cotswolds to the west, the Chilterns to the east and The Midlands to the north, with spurs running south to Henley-on-Thames and north to Banbury.

Historically the area has always had some importance, containing valuable agricultural land in the centre of the country and the prestigious university in the county town of Oxford (whose name came from Anglo-Saxon Oxenaford = "ford for oxen"). Largely ignored by the Romans, it was not until the formation of a settlement at Oxford in the 8th century that the area grew in importance. Alfred the Great was born across the Thames in Wantage, then in Berkshire. The University of Oxford was founded in 1096, though its collegiate structure did not develop until later on. The area was part of the Cotswolds wool trade from the 13th century, generating much wealth, particularly in the western portions of the county in the Oxfordshire Cotswolds. Morris Motors was founded in Oxford in 1912, bringing heavy industry to an otherwise agricultural county. The importance of agriculture as an employer has declined rapidly in the 20th century though; currently under one percent of the county's population are involved due to high mechanisation.

There are fourteen hundreds in Oxfordshire, among them being five of the Chiltern hundreds. The jurisdiction over these five belonged to the manor of Benson, and in 1199 to Robert de Harecourt, a name which is still to be found in the county in the Harcourts of Stanton Harcourt and Nuneham. The county includes small portions formerly of Berkshire and Buckinghamshire, which lie in the hundreds of Bampton and Ploughley respectively.

Throughout most of its history the county was divided into fourteen hundreds, namely Bampton, Banbury, Binfield, Bloxham, Bullingdon, Chadlington, Dorchester, Ewelme, Langtree, Lewknor, Pyrton, Ploughley, Thame and Wootton.

There has been little change in the county boundary; but acts of William IV and Victoria slightly increased its area.

== Pre-Roman times ==
Members of the Atrebates tribe lived in a region stretching between the Thames, the Test, and West Sussex in pre-Roman times.

== Anglo-Saxon England ==
The origin of the county of Oxford is somewhat uncertain; like other divisions of the Mercian kingdom, the older boundaries were entirely wiped out, and the district was renamed after the principal town. The boundaries, except for the southern one, which is formed by the Thames, are artificial.

The district was overrun in the 6th century by the victorious West Saxons, who took Benson and Eynsham, as may be seen in the Saxon Chronicle for 571. In the 7th century the Mercians held all the northern border of the Thames, and during the 8th century this district twice changed hands, falling to Wessex after the battle of Burford, and to Mercia after a battle at Bensington.

As part of the Mercian kingdom it was included in the diocese of Lincoln. A bishopric had been established at Dorchester as early as 634, when Birinus, the apostle of Wessex, was given an episcopal seat there, but when a bishop was established at Winchester this bishopric seems to have come to an end. Before the Mercian conquest in 777, Oxfordshire was in the diocese of Sherborne. In 873 the jurisdiction of Dorchester reached to the Humber, and when the Danes were converted it extended over Leicestershire and Lincolnshire, Oxfordshire forming about an eighth of the diocese.

The Danes overran the county during the 10th century; Thorkell's army burnt Oxford in 1010, and the combined armies of Sweyn and Olaf crossed Watling Street and ravaged the district, Oxford and Winchester submitting to them. In 1018 Danes and Englishmen chose Eadgar's law at an assembly in Oxford, and in 1036, on Canute's death, his son Harold Harefoot was chosen king. Here also took place the stormy meeting following the assembly (gemot) at Northampton, in which Harold Godwinson allowed his brother Tostig to be outlawed and Morkere to be chosen earl in his place, thus preparing the way for his own downfall and for the Norman Conquest.

== Norman Conquest ==
The destruction of houses in Oxford recorded in the Domesday Book may possibly be accounted for by the ravages of the rebel army of Eadwine and Morkcre on this occasion, there being no undisputed mention of a siege by William the Conqueror. Large possessions in the county fell to the Conqueror, and also to his rapacious kinsman, Odo, Bishop of Winchester.

At the Norman Conquest Oxfordshire remained in the diocese of Sherborne, but in 1092 the seat of the diocese was transferred to Lincoln. The bishop of Lincoln also had extensive lands therein, while the abbeys of Abingdon, Osney and Godstow, with other religious houses, held much land in the county. Among lay tenants in chief, Robert D'Oili, heir of Wigod of Walhngford, held many manors and houses in Oxford, of which town he was governor.

By the time of the conquest the importance of Oxford was already well established; the shire moot there is mentioned in Canute's Oxford laws, and it was undoubtedly the seat of the county court from the first, the castle being the county gaol. The principal historical events between this period and the Civil War belong less to the history of the county than to that of the city of Oxford.

== 13th to 16th centuries ==
The county was represented in parliament in 1289 by two members. The pestilence of 1349, the conversion of arable into pasture land caused a steady decline in prosperity from the early 14th century, when it had been second in prosperity in the kingdom, owing its wealth largely to its well-watered pastures, which bred sheep whose wool was famous all over England, and to its good supply of water power. Salt is mentioned as a product of the county in Domesday Book. Various small industries grew up, such as plush-making at Banbury, leather works at Bampton and Burford, gloves at Woodstock, and malt at Henley. Glass was made at Benson and Stokenchurch in the reign of Henry VI, and the wool trade continued, though not in so flourishing a state, Witney retaining its fame in blanket making.

The dissolution of the monasteries, though it affected the county greatly, caused no general disturbance, but the enclosure of common land in the early 16th century led to agricultural depression and discontent.

In 1542 a bishopric of Osney and Thame was established, taking its title from Oxford, the last abbot of Osney being appointed to it. In 1546 the existing bishopric of Oxford was established. The ecclesiastical boundaries remain as they were when archdeacons were first appointed — the county and archdeaconry being conterminous — and the county being almost entirely in the diocese of Oxford.

== 17th century ==
=== English Civil War ===
When King Charles I won the Battle of Edgehill (23 October 1642)—the first battle of the English Civil War—Oxford at once became the material and moral stronghold of the royalist cause. Every manor house in the district became an advanced work, and from Banbury in the north to Marlborough in the west and Reading in the south the walled towns formed an outer line of defence.

For the campaign of 1643 the role of this strong position was to be the detention of the main parliamentary army until the royalists from the north and the west could come into line on either hand, after which the united royal forces were to close upon London on all sides, and in the operations of that year Oxfordshire successfully performed its allotted functions. No serious breach was made in the line of defence, and more than once, notably at the Battle of Chalgrove Field (18 June 1643), Prince Rupert's cavalry struck hard and successfully.

In the campaign of Newbury which followed, the parliamentary troops under the Essex passed through north Oxfordshire on their way to the relief of Gloucester, and many confused skirmishes took place between them and Rupert's men. When the campaign closed with the virtual defeat of the Royalists, the fortresses of the county offered them a refuge which Essex was powerless to disturb.

The following campaign witnessed a change in Charles' strategy. Realizing his numerical weakness he abandoned the idea of an envelopment, and decided to use Oxfordshire as the stronghold from which he could strike in all directions. The commanding situation of the city itself prevented any serious attempt at investment by dividing the enemy's forces, but material wants made it impossible for Charles to maintain permanently his central position. Plans were continually resolved upon and cancelled on both sides, and eventually Essex headed for the south-west, leaving Sir William Waller to face the king alone. The Battle of Cropredy Bridge followed (29 June 1644), and the victorious king turned south to pursue and capture Essex at Lostwithiel in Cornwall.

In the remaining operations of 1644 Oxfordshire again served as a refuge and as a base (Newbury and Donnington). With the appearance on the scene of Oliver Cromwell and the New Model Army a fresh interest arose. Having started from Windsor on the 20 April 1645, the future Protector carried out a daring cavalry raid. He caught and scattered the royalists unawares at Islip; then he pursued the fugitives to Bletchington and terrified the governor into surrendering. He swept right round Oxford, fought again at Bampton, and finally rejoined his chief, Fairfax, in Berkshire.

A few days later Charles again marched away northwards, while Fairfax was ordered to besiege Oxford. In spite of the difficulties of the besiegers Charles was compelled to turn back to relieve the city, and the consequent delay led to the campaign and disaster of Naseby (14 June 1645). Yet even after Naseby the actual position of Oxfordshire was practically unshaken.

It is true that Abingdon with its parliamentary garrison was a standing menace, but the districts east of the Cherwell and Thames, and the triangle bounded by Oxford, Faringdon and Banbury, still retained its importance, until early in 1646 the enemy closed from all sides on the last stronghold of royalism. The Battle of Stow-on-the-Wold witnessed the final battle of the First English Civil War. On the 9 May Banbury surrendered, and two days later Oxford itself was closely invested. On the 24 June 16e46 the city capitulated, and three days later Wallingford, the last place to give in, followed its example. The war left the county in an exceedingly impoverished condition.

== 18th and 19th centuries ==
In 1830, the enclosure of Otmoor led to serious riots, in which the people gathered in Oxford at St Giles' fair joined.

== 20th and 21st centuries ==
The Oxfordshire and Buckinghamshire Light Infantry, the main army unit in the area, was based at Cowley Barracks on Bullingdon Green, Cowley.

The Vale of the White Horse district and parts of the South Oxfordshire administrative district south of the River Thames were historically part of Berkshire, but were added to the administrative county of Oxfordshire in 1974. Conversely, the Caversham area of Reading now belongs to Berkshire but was historically part of Oxfordshire as was the parish of Stokenchurch, now in administrative Buckinghamshire.

2007 marked the county's 1000th birthday. Two 40-foot (12 m) canoes imported from Sylhet in Bangladesh were brought to Oxfordshire to host the United Kingdom's first Nowka Bais competition. The sport became an annual cultural event of Oxfordshire, attracting thousands such as the likes of the High Commissioner of Bangladesh.

== Antiquities ==
=== Castles ===
The remains of castles are scanty. The majority of them were probably built for defence in the Anarchy of Stephen's reign (1100–1135), and were not maintained after order was restored. Considerable portions of the Norman Oxford Castle survive, however, while there are slighter remains of the castle at Bampton, the seat of Aylmer de Valence in 1313.

=== Mansions ===
Among remains of former mansions there may be noted the 14th century Greys Court near Henley-on-Thames, Minster Lovell, on the Windrush above Witney, and Rycote, between Thame and Oxford. Minster Lovell, the extensive ruins of which make an exquisite picture by the river-side, was the seat of Francis, Lord Lovel, who, being the son of a Lancastrian father, incurred the hatred of that party by serving Richard III, and afterwards assisted the cause of Lambert Simnel, mysteriously disappearing after the Battle of Stoke. The remains of Rycote (partly incorporated with a farmhouse) are of fine Elizabethan brick, and in the chapel attached to the manor there is remarkable Jacobean woodwork, the entire fittings of the church, including the canopied pews and altar-table, being of this period. Here Princess [Elizabeth was kept in 1554, before her accession, and afterwards resided as Queen.

Of ancient mansions still inhabited at the start of the 20th century, the finest is Broughton Castle near Banbury, dating from 1301. Others are Shirburn Castle, begun in 1377, but mainly Perpendicular of the next century; Stanton Harcourt, dating from 1450, with a gatehouse of 1540, a vast kitchen, and Pope's Tower, named from the poet, who stayed here more than once. Mapledurham, on the Thames above Reading, is a fine Tudor mansion of brick; and Water Eaton, on the Cherwell above Oxford, is a singularly perfect Jacobean house of stone, with a chapel of the same period resembling pure Perpendicular.

Other mansions in the county include Blenheim Palace, near Woodstock; the former Holton House (now replaced by a Georgian building), near Wheatley, was the scene in 1646 of the wedding of the Parliamentary Major General Henry Ireton and Bridget daughter of Oliver Cromwell.

=== Ecclesiastical ===
The university had a significant influence upon the ecclesiastical history of Oxfordshire. A large number of monastic foundations arose, such as those of Augustinian canons at Bicester, Caversham, Cold Norton, Dorchester, Osney (a foundation just outside the walls of Oxford) and Wroxton; of Cistercians, at Bruern and Thame; of Benedictines, at Cogges, Eynsham, Milton; of Mathurins, at Nuffield; of Gilbertines, at Clattercote; of Templars, at Sandford-on-Thames. There was at Gosford one of the only two preceptories of female Templars in England. Of all these, excepting the abbey church at Dorchester, remains are scanty. A few domestic buildings remain at Studley; the boundary walls still stand of Godstow Nunnery on the Thames, the retreat and burial-place of Rosamund Clifford or "Fair Rosamund," the object of Henry II's famous courtship; and there are traces of Rewley Abbey within Oxford.

In ecclesiastical architecture Oxfordshire, apart from Oxford itself, is rich, but there is no dominant style, nearly all the churches being of mixed dates. In fact, of the most important churches only Iffley, Adderbury and Minster Lovell need be taken as types of a single style. Iffley, 1 mile (1.6 km) south of Oxford, is one of the finer examples of pure Norman in England, with an ornate west front. Adderbury, 4 miles (6.4 km) south of Banbury, has a massive central tower and spire. The parish church of Minster Lovell is pure Perpendicular style; its central tower is supported on four detached piers.

One feature common to several churches in the county are spires. The short ungainly spire of Oxford cathedral was among the earliest, if not the first, constructed in England, and served as a model from which were probably developed the splendid central spires of the great churches at Witney, Bampton, Shipton-under-Wychwood and Bradwell. There are also three fine spires in the north: Bloxham, Adderbury and King's Sutton (across the border in Northamptonshire), which are locally proverbial as typifying length, strength and beauty. Bloxham church, mainly decorated with Norman portions and an Early English west front, is one of the largest in the county. In the west, Burford (Norman and later) is noteworthy, and in the porch of the Norman church of Langford is seen the rare feature of a crucifix with the figure cloaked.

At South Leigh, there are mural paintings of the 15th century. About 5 miles (8.0 km) north of Oxford are Kidlington with a needle-like Perpendicular spire, and Islip, which, as the birthplace of Edward the Confessor, retains a connection with his Abbey of Westminster (the Dean and Chapter of which are lords of the manor and patrons of the living). In the south-east, Dorchester Abbey, with its nave of transitional Norman, has a curious decorated Jesse window, the tracery representing the genealogical tree of the patriarch.

At Cuddesdon there is another large cruciform church, Norman and later. Ewelme church (Perpendicular) is remarkable for the tomb of Alice, Duchess of Suffolk (1475), with tracery and gilded canopy, and that of Sir Thomas Chaucer (1434), ornamented with enamelled coats of arms. Here William de la Pole, 1st Duke of Suffolk, founded in 1436 the picturesque hospital and free school still standing.

== See also ==
- History of England
