= List of English civil wars =

This article provides a list of internal military conflicts throughout the history of England.

== Civil wars ==
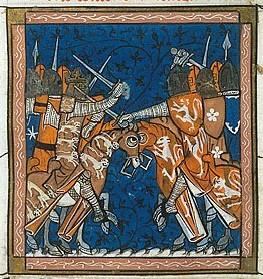
Second Barons' War in England, the Royals (Henry III) on the left vs. the Barons (Montfort) on the right. (British Library, Royal 16 G VI f. 427v)

This is a list of civil wars that have occurred in the history of England.

1. The Anarchy (1135–1154): a civil war in England and Normandy between 1135 and 1154 surrounding a succession crisis towards the end of the reign of Henry I, fought between the supporters of the claim of King Stephen and that of Empress Matilda, also known as Empress Maud(e). The eventual outcome was the accession of the Angevins in the person of Henry II.
2. First Barons' War (1215–1217): a civil war in the Kingdom of England in which a group of rebellious barons, led by Robert Fitzwalter and supported by a French army under the future Louis VIII of France, made war on King John of England.
3. Second Barons' War (1264–1267): a civil war between the forces of a number of barons led by Simon de Montfort against Royalist forces led by Prince Edward (later Edward I of England), in the name of Henry III.
4. Despenser War (1321–1322, 1326): a baronial revolt in England and Wales against Edward II instigated by Marcher Lords in opposition to court favourite Hugh Despenser.
  - Invasion of England (1326): Continuation of the Despenser War. Isabella of France, and her lover Roger Mortimer's invasion led to: the executions of Hugh Despenser the Younger and Hugh Despenser the Elder; the abdication of Isabella's husband King Edward II for their son Edward III; and Edward II's death, most likely assassinated by orders of Isabella and Mortimer.
5. Wars of the Roses (1455–1487): a series of dynastic civil wars for the throne of England fought between supporters of two rival branches of the royal House of Plantagenet: the House of York and the House of Lancaster.
6. The English Civil War (1642–1652): a series of armed conflicts and political machinations between Parliamentarians ("Roundheads") and Royalists ("Cavaliers") in the Kingdom of England over, principally, the manner of its government.
  - First English Civil War (1642–1646): the supporters of King Charles I against the supporters of the Long Parliament
  - Second English Civil War (1648–1649): the supporters of King Charles I against the supporters of the Long Parliament
  - Third English Civil War (1650–1652): the supporters of King Charles II against the supporters of the Rump Parliament
7. Jacobite Rebellions: A Civil war in England, Scotland, and Ireland fought over many years to restore the House of Stuart to the British throne. The conflict started after James II and VII was deposed and exiled in the Glorious Revolution of 1688.
  - Williamite War in Ireland (1688–1691): The Battle of the Boyne saw the last battle between two rival claimants for the throne
  - Jacobite rising of 1689 (1689–1692)
  - Jacobite rising of 1715 (1715–1716)
  - Jacobite rising of 1719 (1719)
  - Jacobite rising of 1745 (1741–1746): Jacobite restoration attempt defeated
8. American Revolutionary War (1775–1783): When the American Revolution first started, it was seen as a civil war. (Note: Some historians name the 1861–1865 war the "Second American Civil War", because in their view, the American Revolutionary War can also be considered a civil war (since the term can be used in reference to any war in which one political body separates itself from another political body). They then refer to the Independence War, which resulted in the separation of the Thirteen Colonies from the British Empire, as the "First American Civil War". A significant number of American colonists stayed loyal to the British Crown and as Loyalists fought on the British side while opposite were a significant amount of colonists called Patriots who fought on the American side. In some localities, there was fierce fighting between Americans including gruesome instances of hanging, drawing, and quartering on both sides.: As early as 1789, David Ramsay, an American patriot historian, wrote in his History of the American Revolution that "Many circumstances concurred to make the American war particularly calamitous. It was originally a civil war in the estimation of both parties." Framing the American Revolutionary War as a civil war is gaining increasing examination.. You can read part two of his 1789 book in full here; A group of Bristol, England merchants wrote to King George III in 1775 voicing their “most anxious apprehensions for ourselves and Posterity that we behold the growing distractions in America threaten” and ask for their majesty’s “Wisdom and Goodness” to save them from “a lasting and ruinous Civil War.”. You can read the 1775 petition in full here; The “constrained voice” is a good synopsis of how the British viewed the American Revolutionary War. From anxiety to a foreboding sense of the conflict being a civil war, In the early stages of the rebellion by the American colonists, most of them still saw themselves as English subjects who were being denied their rights as such. “Taxation without representation is tyranny,” James Otis reportedly said in protest of the lack of colonial representation in Parliament. What made the American Revolution look most like a civil war, though, was the reality that about one-third of the colonists, known as loyalists (or Tories), continued to support and fought on the side of the crown.) The colonists initially fought for what they believed were their fundamental "Rights of Englishmen". It became a larger international war in 1778 once France joined. (Note: The Revolution was both an international conflict, with Britain and France vying on land and sea, and a civil war among the colonists, causing over 60,000 loyalists to flee their homes.: France entered the American Revolution on the side of the colonists in 1778, turning what had essentially been a civil war into an international conflict.; Until early in 1778 the conflict was a civil war within the British Empire, but afterward it became an international war as France (in 1778) and Spain (in 1779) joined the colonies against Britain. Meanwhile, the Netherlands, which provided both official recognition of the United States and financial support for it, was engaged in its own war against Britain.)

== Notable uprisings ==
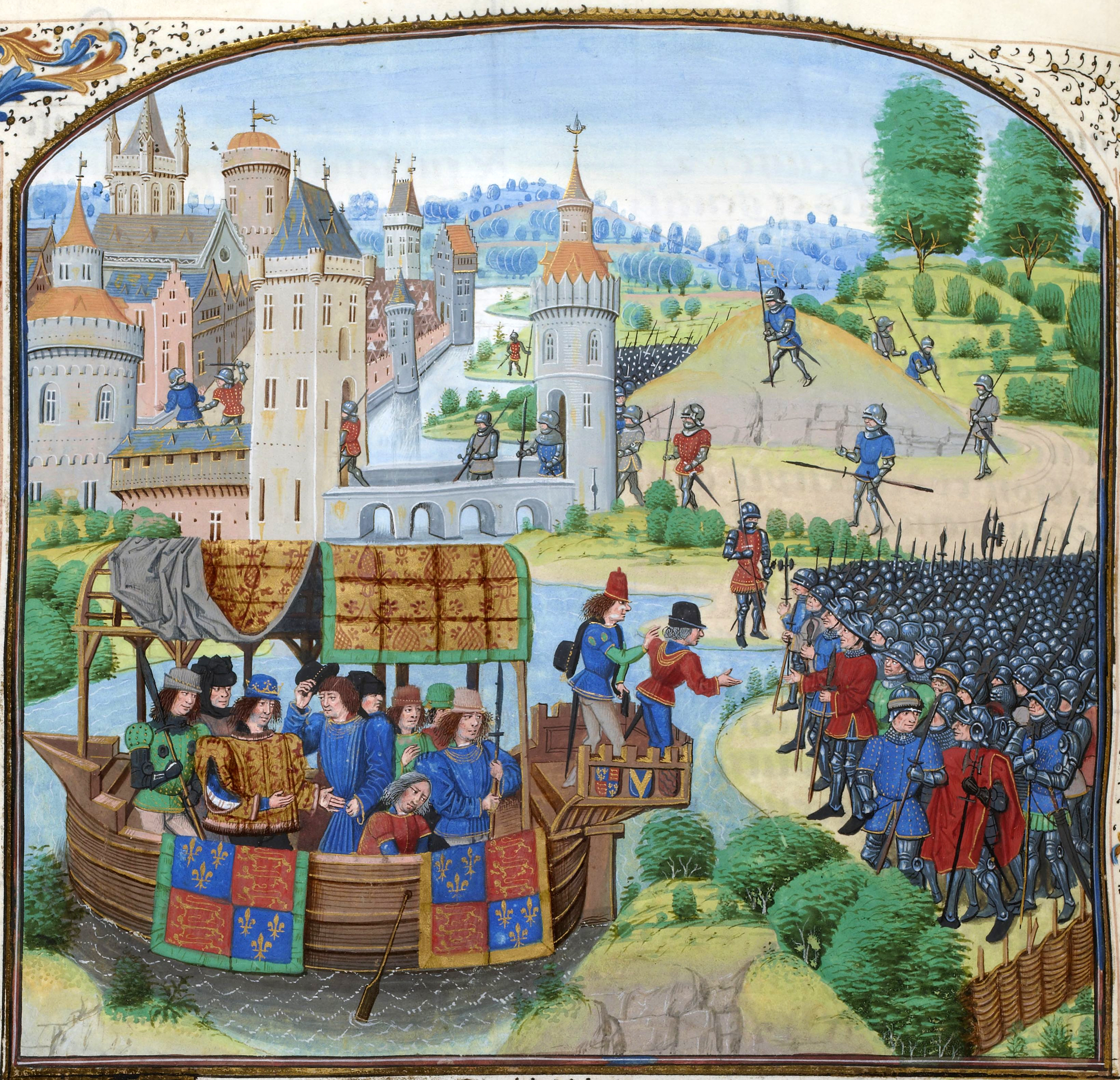
The boy-king Richard II meets the Peasants' Revolt rebels on 14 June 1381, in a miniature from a 1470s copy of Jean Froissart's Chronicles.

1. Harrying of the North (1069–1070) – An uprising which started 4 years after the Norman Conquest. Edgar Ætheling, the grandson of Edmund Ironside and the last notable heir to the House of Wessex, fought against the Normans with the support of the King of Denmark Sweyn II, Anglo-Saxons, and Anglo-Scandinavians. It ended in defeat for the Anglo-Saxons and Anglo-Scandinavians. William the Conqueror paid Sweyn and his Danish fleet to go home, but the remaining rebels refused to meet him in battle, and he decided to starve them out by laying waste to the northern shires using scorched earth tactics. The Norman campaign to reconquer Northern England resulted in a genocide towards the people living there.
2. Ely Rebellion (1070–1071) – An anti-Norman insurrection centred on the Isle of Ely. The Danish king Sweyn Estrithson sent a small army to try to establish a camp on the Isle of Ely. The Isle became a refuge for Anglo-Saxon forces under Earl Morcar, Bishop Aethelwine of Durham and Hereward the Wake in 1071. The area was taken by William the Conqueror only after a prolonged struggle.
3. Revolt of the Earls (1075) – a rebellion of three earls against William the Conqueror, the last serious resistance to his rule.
4. Rebellion of 1088 – a war in England and Normandy concerning the division of lands in the Kingdom of England and the Duchy of Normandy between William Rufus and Robert Curthose two of the sons of William the Conqueror.
5. Revolt of 1173–1174 – a French-aided rebellion of Eleanor of Aquitaine against her husband King Henry and the Angevin Empire.
6. Welsh Uprising (1282) – in England and Wales
7. Peasants' Revolt (1381) – in England
8. Oldcastle Revolt (1414) – rising of early Protestants known as Lollards centred on north London.
9. Jack Cade's Rebellion (1450) – in England
10. Cornish Rebellion of 1497 – in England
11. Pilgrimage of Grace (1536) – in northern England, a popular Catholic uprising against the dissolution of the monasteries and land enclosures during October 1536.
  - Lincolnshire Rising (1536) – September prelude to the Pilgrimage of Grace.
  - Bigod's rebellion (1537) – a second round of rebellion in northern England following the Pilgrimage of Grace.
12. The 1549 Rebellions – a series of rebellions across the country in response to land enclosures and the introduction of the 1549 Book of Common Prayer:
  - Prayer Book Rebellion – a Cornish rebellion against the imposition of the English language liturgy.
  - Buckinghamshire and Oxfordshire rising – a rebellion against land enclosures and iconoclasm.
  - Kett's Rebellion – an East Anglian rebellion against land enclosures.
13. Rising of the North (1569) – attempt by northern Catholic aristocrats to depose Elizabeth I in favour of Mary, Queen of Scots.
14. Monmouth Rebellion (1685) – attempt by Protestant rebels, led by James Scott, 1st Duke of Monmouth, to overthrow the Catholic James II.
15. Glorious Revolution (1688–1689) – James II replaced as king by his daughter Mary II and her husband William III.

== See also ==
- Chronology of the Wars of the Three Kingdoms
- List of wars involving England
- List of wars in Great Britain
- English Civil War (disambiguation)
- Glorious Revolution
- List of civil wars
