= Langtree Hundred =

Historical division of Oxfordshire, England

Langtree is an ancient hundred in the south-east of the county of Oxfordshire established during the Anglo-Saxon era. It was used to organize the local militia, apportion taxes and maintain roads. It was especially important in apprehending criminals and had a hundred court for local trials. Since the end of the nineteenth century, its functions have been assumed by other divisions of government. It is currently dormant.

The hundred included the ancient parishes of:

- Checkendon
- Crowmarsh Gifford
- Goring-on-Thames
- Ipsden
- Mapledurham
- Mongewell
- Newnham Murren
- North Stoke
- Whitchurch-on-Thames

The hundred did not include the parish of South Stoke, which was a detached part of Dorchester hundred, surrounded by Langtree hundred.

The name has survived in modern use in Langtree School at Woodcote, and the Langtree Team Ministry, a Church of England benefice.

== See also ==
- History of Oxfordshire
