= English Wars =

English Wars may refer to:

- Anglo-Dutch Wars
- English Wars (Scandinavia), between Denmark and Sweden, with British involvement
- List of wars involving England

== See also ==
- English Civil War (disambiguation)
- List of wars involving Great Britain
