= Wickham Heath =

Hamlet in Berkshire, England

Coordinates: 51°25′35″N 1°24′00″W

- Hamlet
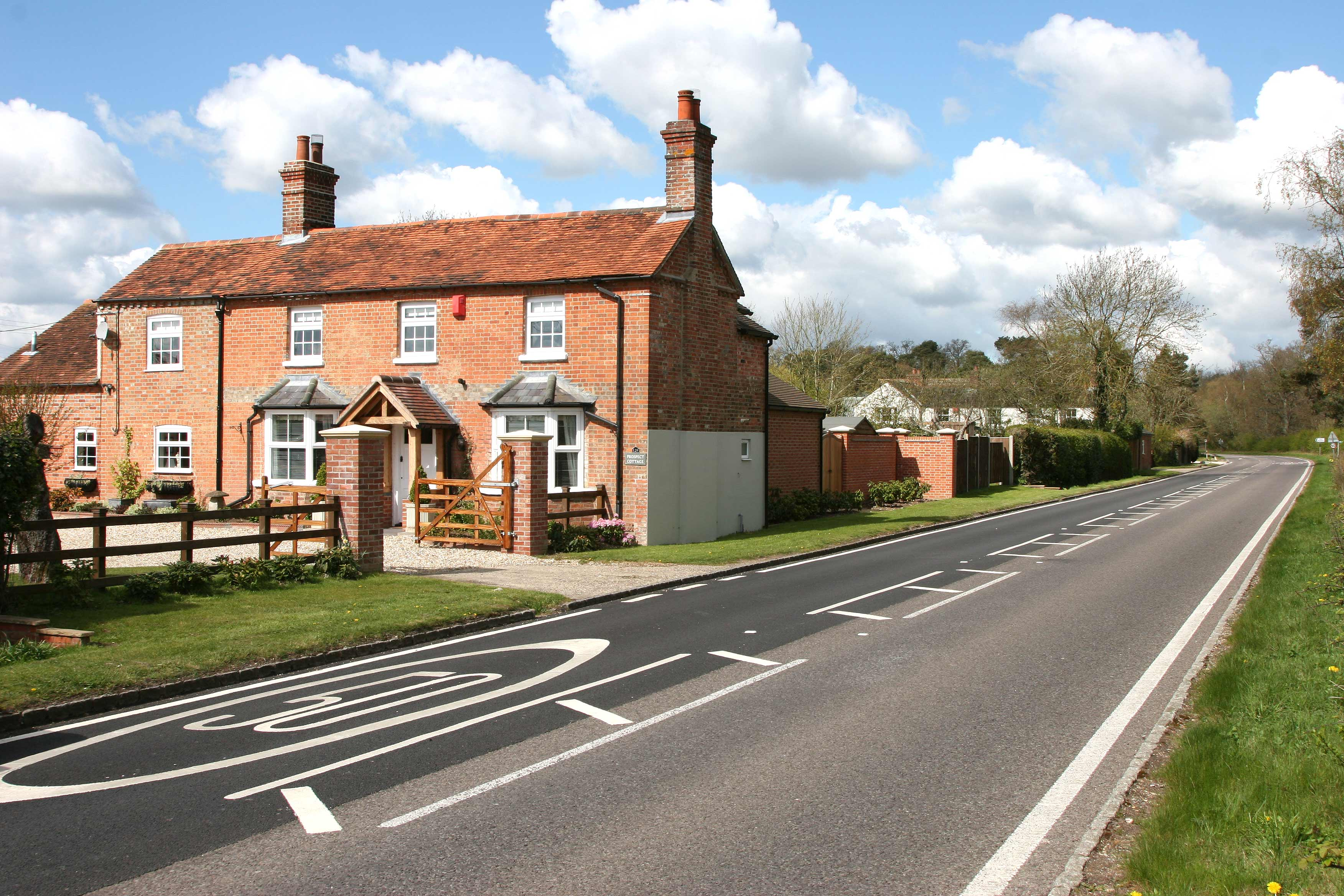
- Wickham Heath

- Location within Berkshire
- OS grid reference: SU417695
- Metropolitan borough: West Berkshire
- Metropolitan county: Berkshire
- Region: South East
- Country: England
- Sovereign state: United Kingdom
- Post town: NEWBURY
- Postcode district: RG20 8PH
- Dialling code: 01635
- Police: Thames Valley
- Fire: Royal Berkshire
- Ambulance: South Central
- UK Parliament: Newbury

Wickham Heath is a hamlet in Berkshire, England, and part of the civil parish of Welford. The settlement lies on the B4000, approximately 4 miles (6.4 km) north-west of Newbury.
