= First English Civil War, 1646 =

1646 was the fifth and final year of the First English Civil War. By the beginning of 1646, military victory for the Parliamentary forces was in sight. A Royalist army was defeated in the field at the Battle of Torrington on 16 February and the last Royalist field army was defeated at the Battle of Stow-on-the-Wold on 21 March. From then on the New Model Army cleared the remaining Royalist strongholds. The politics moved into a post-war phase with all the major factions in England and Scotland trying to reach an accommodation with King Charles I that would further their own particular interests.

== End of the war ==
At the start of 1646 the only field army remaining to Charles I was Lord Goring's, and though Lord Hopton, who sorrowfully accepted the command after Goring's departure, tried at the last moment to revive the memories and the local patriotism of 1643, it was of no use to fight against the New Model Army with the armed rabble that Goring turned over to him. Dartmouth surrendered on 18 January 1646. Hopton was defeated at the Battle of Torrington on 16 February and surrendered the remnant of his inferior army on 14 March. Exeter fell on 13 April. Elsewhere, Hereford had been taken on 17 December 1645. Lord Astley raised a field army of about 3,000 men from the Royalist garrisons in the West Midlands in the hope of reaching Oxford and raising the siege, but his army was intercepted by contingents of the New Model Army and decisively beaten at the Battle of Stow-on-the-Wold, the last pitched battle of the war, on 21 March 1646.

Charles I, after leaving Newark in November 1645, had spent the winter in and around Oxford, whence, after an adventurous journey, he returned to Newark, which was under siege by Scottish and English Parliamentarian armies. Charles I chose to surrender to the commander of the Scottish army, Lieutenant-General David Leslie, and entered their camp at Southwell, Nottinghamshire on 5 May 1646. At the request of Charles I the commander of the Newark garrison, Lord Belasyse, agreed to terms and surrendered Newark on 8 May to the English Parliamentary commander, Sydenham Poyntz.

The third siege of Oxford ended with the signing of a treaty on 24 June; the keys of the city were formally handed over to Lord General Thomas Fairfax the next day. However, a few other garrisons held out for a while. Worcester surrendered on 23 July 1646 after a siege of 33 days and Wallingford Castle, the last English royalist stronghold, fell after a 65-day siege on 27 July. On 31 August James Graham, Marquess Montrose escaped from the Scottish Highlands. Two Royalist castles in Wales held out a little longer: Raglan surrendered on 19 August and the last Royalist post, Harlech Castle, maintained the futile struggle until 13 March 1647.

== Aftermath ==
The close of the First Civil War left England and Scotland in the hands, potentially, of any one of the four parties or any combination of two or more that should prove strong enough to dominate the rest. Armed political Royalism was indeed at an end, but Charles, though practically a prisoner, considered himself and was, almost to the last, considered by the rest as necessary to ensure the success of whichever amongst the other three parties could come to terms with him. Thus he passed successively into the hands of the Scots, the English Parliament and the New Model Army, trying to reverse the verdict of arms by coquetting with each in turn.

The Presbyterians and the Scots, after Cornet George Joyce of Fairfax's horse seized the person of the King for the New Model Army on 3 June 1647, began at once to prepare for a fresh civil war, this time against independency, as embodied in the New Model Army. Its opponents attempted to disband it, to send it on foreign service, to cut off its arrears of pay, with the result that it was exasperated beyond control, and, remembering not merely its grievances but also the principle for which it had fought, soon became the most powerful political party in the realm. From 1646 to 1648 the breach between the New Model Army and the English Parliament widened day by day until finally the Presbyterian party, combined with the Scots and the remaining Royalists, felt itself strong enough to begin a second civil war.

== Notes ==
| ← 1645 | First English Civil War | Second Civil War → |
