= First English Civil War, 1643 =

1643 was the second year of the First English Civil War. Politically, the latter months of the year were the turning-point of the war. The King made a truce with the Irish rebels on 15 September which united against him nearly every class in Protestant England. Only ten days after the "Irish Cessation," Parliament at Westminster swore to the Solemn League and Covenant, and the die was cast.

== The winter of 1642−43 ==
In the winter, while Essex's army lay inactive at Windsor, Charles by degrees consolidated his position in the region of Oxford. The city was fortified as a redoubt for the whole area, and Reading, Wallingford, Abingdon, Brill, Banbury and Marlborough constituted a complete defensive ring which was developed by the creation of smaller posts from time to time.

In the North and West, winter campaigns were actively carried on: "It is summer in Yorkshire, summer in Devon, and cold winter at Windsor", said one of Essex's critics. At the beginning of December 1642, Newcastle crossed the River Tees and defeated Sir John Hotham, the Parliamentary commander in the North Riding. He then joined hands with the hard-pressed Royalists at York, establishing himself between that city and Pontefract. Lord Fairfax of Cameron and his son Sir Thomas Fairfax, who commanded for the Parliament in Yorkshire, had to retire to the district between Hull and Selby, and Newcastle was now free to turn his attention to the Puritan "clothing towns" of the West Riding, Leeds, Halifax and Bradford. The townsmen, however, showed a determined front. Sir Thomas Fairfax with a picked body of cavalry rode through Newcastle's lines into the West Riding to help them, and about the end of January 1643, Newcastle gave up the attempt to reduce the towns.

Newcastle continued his march southward, however, and gained ground for the King as far as Newark-on-Trent, so as to be in touch with the Royalists of Nottinghamshire, Derbyshire and Leicestershire (who, especially about Newark and Ashby-de-la-Zouch, were strong enough to neutralise the local forces of Parliament), and to prepare the way for the further advance of the army of the north, when the Queen's convoy should arrive from overseas.

In the west, Hopton and his friends, having obtained a true bill from the grand jury against the Parliamentary disturbers of the peace, placed themselves at the head of the county militia. They drove the rebels from Cornwall, after which they raised a small force for general service and invaded Devonshire in November 1642. Subsequently, a Parliamentary army under the Earl of Stamford was withdrawn from South Wales to engage Hopton, who had to retire into Cornwall. There, however, the Royalist general was free to employ the militia again, and thus reinforced, he won a victory over a part of Stamford's forces at the Battle of Bradock Down near Liskeard on 19 January 1643 and resumed the offensive.

About the same time, Hertford, no longer opposed by Stamford, brought over the South Wales Royalists to Oxford. The fortified area around that place was widened by the capture of Cirencester on 2 February. Gloucester and Bristol were now the only important garrisons of the Roundheads in the west. In the Midlands, in spite of a Parliamentary victory won by Sir William Brereton at the Battle of Nantwich on 28 January, the Royalists of Shropshire, Staffordshire, and Leicestershire soon extended their influence through Ashby-de-la-Zouch into Nottinghamshire and joined hands with their friends at Newark.

Around Chester, a new Royalist army was being formed under the Lord Byron, and all the efforts of Sir John Brereton and of Sir John Gell, 1st Baronet, the leading supporter of Parliament in Derbyshire, were required to hold their own, even before Newcastle's army was added to the list of their enemies. The Lord Brooke, who commanded for Parliament in Warwickshire and Staffordshire and was looked on by many as Essex's eventual successor, was killed in besieging Lichfield Cathedral on 2 March, and, though the cathedral soon capitulated, Gell and Brereton were severely handled in the indecisive Battle of Hopton Heath near Stafford on 19 March, and Prince Rupert, after an abortive raid on Bristol (7 March), marched rapidly northward, storming Birmingham en route, and recaptured Lichfield Cathedral. He was, however, soon recalled to Oxford to take part in the main campaign.

The position of affairs for Parliament was perhaps at its worst in January. The Royalist successes of November and December, the ever-present dread of foreign intervention, and the burden of new taxation which Parliament now found itself compelled to impose, disheartened its supporters. Disorders broke out in London, and, while the more determined of the rebels began thus early to think of calling in the military assistance of the Scots, the majority were for peace on any conditions.

But soon the position improved somewhat; the Earl of Stamford in the west and Brereton and Gell in the Midlands, though hard pressed, were at any rate in arms and undefeated, Newcastle had failed to conquer the West Riding, and Sir William Waller, who had cleared Hampshire and Wiltshire of "malignants", entered Gloucestershire early in March, destroyed a small Royalist force at Highnam on 24 March, and secured Bristol and Gloucester for Parliament.

Finally, some of Charles's own intrigues opportunely came to light. The waverers, seeing the impossibility of plain dealing with the court, rallied again to the party of resistance. The series of negotiations called by the name of the "Treaty of Oxford" closed in April, with no more result than those which had preceded Edgehill and Turnham Green.

About this time too, following and improving upon the example of Newcastle in the north, Parliament ordered the formation of the celebrated "associations" or groups of counties, banded together by mutual consent for defence. The most powerful and best organised of these was that of the eastern counties (headquartered in Cambridge), where there was little local royalist activity, the danger of attack from the north was near enough to induce great energy in the preparations for meeting it, and at the same time, too distant effectively to interfere with these preparations. Above all, the Eastern Association was from the first, guided and inspired by Colonel Cromwell.

== Plans ==
The King's plan of operations for the next campaign, which was perhaps inspired from abroad, was more elaborate than the simple "point" of 1642. The King's army, based on the fortified area around Oxford, was counted sufficient to use up Essex's forces. On either hand, therefore, in Yorkshire and in the west, the Royalist armies were to fight their way inwards towards London. After that, all three armies were to converge in London in due season, and to cut off the Essex's supplies and its sea-borne revenue, and to starve the rebellion into surrender. The condition of this threefold advance was of course that the enemy should not be able to defeat the armies in detail, i.e., that he should be fixed and held in the Thames valley; this secured, there was no purely military objection against operating in separate armies from the circumference towards the centre.

It was on the rock of local feeling that the King's plan came to grief. Even after the arrival of the Queen and her convoy, Newcastle had to allow her to proceed with a small force, and to remain behind with the main body. This was because of Lancashire and the West Riding, and above all because the port of Hull, in the hands of the Fairfaxes, constituted a menace that the Royalists of the East Riding of Yorkshire refused to ignore.

Hopton's advance too, undertaken without the Cornish levies, was checked in the Battle of Sourton Down (Dartmoor) on 25 April. On the same day, Waller captured Hereford. Essex had already left Windsor to undertake the siege of Reading. Reading was the most important point in the circle of fortresses round Oxford, which after a vain attempt at relief, surrendered to him on 26 April. Thus the opening operations were unfavourable, not indeed so far as to require the scheme to be abandoned, but at least, delaying the development until the campaigning season was far advanced.

== Victories of Hopton ==
However, affairs improved in May. The Queen's long-expected convoy arrived at Woodstock on 13 May 1643. Stamford's army, which had again entered Cornwall, was attacked in its selected position at Stratton, and practically annihilated by Hopton on 16 May. This brilliant victory was due, above all, to Sir Bevil Grenville and the lithe Cornishmen. Though they were but 2,400 against 5,400, and destitute of artillery, they stormed "Stamford Hill", killed 300 of the enemy and captured 1,700 more with all their guns, colours and baggage. Devon was at once overrun by the victors.

Essex's army, for want of material resources, had had to be content with the capture of Reading. A Royalist force under Hertford and Prince Maurice von Simmern (Rupert's brother) moved out as far as Salisbury to hold out a hand to their friends in Devonshire. Waller, the only Parliamentary commander, left in the field in the west, had to abandon his conquests in the Severn valley to oppose the further progress of his intimate friend and present enemy, Hopton.

Early in June, Hertford and Hopton united at Chard and rapidly moved, with some cavalry skirmishing, towards Bath, where Waller's army lay. Avoiding the barrier of the Mendips, they moved round via Frome to the Avon. But Waller, thus cut off from London and threatened with investment, acted with great skill. Some days of manoeuvres and skirmishing followed, after which Hertford and Hopton found themselves on the north side of Bath, facing Waller's entrenched position on the top of Lansdown Hill. This position, the Royalists stormed on 5 July. The battle of Lansdown was a second Stratton for the Cornishmen, but this time the enemy was of different quality and far differently led. And they had to mourn the loss of Sir Bevil Grenville and the greater part of their whole force.

At dusk, both sides stood on the flat summit of the hill, still firing into one another with such energy as was not yet expended. In the night, Waller drew off his men into Bath. "We were glad they were gone", wrote a Royalist officer, "for if they had not, I know who had within the hour." Next day, Hopton was severely injured by the explosion of a wagon containing the reserve ammunition. The Royalists, finding their victory profitless, moved eastward to Devizes, closely followed by the enemy.

On 10 July, Sir William Waller took post on Roundway Down, overlooking Devizes, and captured a Royalist ammunition column from Oxford. On 11 July he came down and invested Hopton's foot in Devizes itself. The Royalist cavalry, Hertford and Maurice with them, rode away towards Salisbury. But although the siege of Devizes was pressed with such vigour that an assault was fixed for the evening of 13 July, the Cornishmen, Hopton directing the defence from his bed, held out stubbornly. On the afternoon of 13 July, Prince Maurice's horsemen appeared on Roundway Down, having ridden to Oxford, picked up reinforcements there, and returned at full speed to save their comrades.

Waller's army tried its best, but some of its elements were of doubtful quality and the ground was all in Maurice's favour. The battle did not last long. The combined attack of the Oxford force from Roundway and of Hopton's men from the town practically annihilated Waller's army. Very soon afterwards, Rupert came up with fresh Royalist forces, and the combined armies moved westward. Bristol, the second port of the kingdom, was their objective. On 26 July, four days from the opening of the siege, it was in their hands. Waller, with the beaten remnant of his army at Bath, was powerless to intervene. The effect of this blow was felt even in Dorset. Within three weeks of the surrender, Maurice, with a body of fast-moving cavalry, overran that county almost unopposed.

== Adwalton Moor ==
Newcastle, meanwhile, had resumed operations against the clothing towns, this time with success. The Fairfaxes had been fighting in the West Riding since January 1643, with such troops from the Hull region as they had been able to bring across Newcastle's lines. They, together with the townsmen, were too weak for Newcastle's increasing forces. An attempt was made to relieve them by bringing up the Parliament's forces in Nottinghamshire, Derbyshire, Lincolnshire and the Eastern Association. But local interests prevailed again, in spite of Cromwell's presence. After assembling at Nottingham, the Midland rebels quietly dispersed to their several counties on 2 June.

The Fairfaxes were left to their fate. At about the same time, Hull itself narrowly escaped capture by the Queen's forces through the treachery of Sir John Hotham, the governor, and his son, the commander of the Lincolnshire Parliamentarians. The latter had been placed under arrest at the instance of Cromwell and of Colonel John Hutchinson, the governor of Nottingham Castle; he escaped to Hull, but both father and son were seized by the citizens and afterwards executed. More serious than an isolated act of treachery was the far-reaching Royalist plot, that had been detected in Parliament itself for complicity, in which Lord Conway, Edmund Waller the poet, and several members of both Houses were arrested.

The safety of Hull was of no avail for the West Riding towns, and the Fairfaxes underwent a decisive defeat at the Battle of Adwalton Moor near Bradford on 30 June. After this, by way of Lincolnshire, they escaped to Hull and reorganised the defence of that place. The West Riding perforce submitted.

The Queen herself, with a second convoy and a small army under Lord Henry Jermyn, soon moved via Newark, Ashby-de-la-Zouch, Lichfield and other Royalist garrisons to Oxford, where she joined her husband on 14 July. But Newcastle (now the Marquess of Newcastle) was not yet ready for his part in the programme. The Yorkshire troops would not march on London while the enemy was master of Hull. By this time, there was a solid barrier between the royal army of the north and the capital. Roundway Down and Adwalton Moor were not, after all, destined to be fatal, though peace riots in London, dissensions in the Houses, and quarrels amongst the generals were their immediate consequences. A new factor had arisen in the war — the Eastern Association.

== Cromwell and the Eastern Association ==
The Eastern Association had already intervened to help in the siege of Reading and had sent troops to the abortive gathering at Nottingham, besides clearing its own ground of "malignants." From the first, Cromwell was the dominant influence.

Fresh from Edgehill, he had told Hampden: "You must get men of a spirit that is likely to go as far as gentlemen will go", not "old decayed serving-men, tapsters and such kind of fellows to encounter gentlemen that have honour and courage and resolution in them". In January 1643, he had gone to his own county to "raise such men as had the fear of God before them, and made some conscience of what they did". These men, once found, were willing, for the cause, to submit to a rigorous training and an iron discipline such as other troops, fighting for honour only or for profit only, could not be brought to endure. The result was soon apparent.

As early as 13 May, Cromwell's regiment of horse, recruited from the horse-loving yeomen of the eastern counties, demonstrated its superiority in the field, in a skirmish near Grantham. In the irregular fighting in Lincolnshire, during June and July (which was on the whole unfavourable to the Parliament), as previously in pacifying the Eastern Association itself, these Puritan troopers distinguished themselves by long and rapid marches that may bear comparison with almost any in the history of the mounted arm. When Cromwell's second opportunity came at Gainsborough on 28 July, the "Lincolneer" horse who were under his orders were fired by the example of Cromwell's own regiment. Cromwell, directing the whole with skill, and above all with energy, utterly routed the Royalist horse and killed their general, Charles Cavendish.

In the meantime the army of Essex had been inactive. After the fall of Reading, a serious epidemic of sickness had reduced it to impotence. On 18 June, the Parliamentary cavalry was routed, and John Hampden mortally wounded at Chalgrove Field near Chiselhampton. When at last Essex, having obtained the desired reinforcements, moved against Oxford from the Aylesbury side, he found his men demoralised by inaction.

Before the menace of Rupert's cavalry, to which he had nothing to oppose, Essex withdrew to Bedfordshire in July. He made no attempt to intercept the march of the Queen's convoys, permitting the Oxford army, which he should have held fast, to intervene effectually in the Midlands, the west, and the south-west. Waller might well complain that Essex, who still held Reading and the Chilterns, had given him neither active nor passive support in the critical days, preceding Roundway Down. Still, only a few voices were raised to demand his removal, and he was shortly to have an opportunity of proving his skill and devotion in a great campaign and a great battle.

The centre and the right of the three Royalist armies had for a moment (Roundway to Bristol) united to crush Waller, but their concentration was short-lived. Plymouth was to Hopton's men, what Hull was to Newcastle's. They would not march on London until the menace to their homes was removed. Further, there were dissensions among the generals, which Charles was too weak to crush. Consequently, the original plan reappeared: The main Royalist army was to operate in the centre, Hopton's (now Maurice's) on the right, Newcastle on the left towards London. While waiting for the fall of Hull and Plymouth, Charles naturally decided to make the best use of his time by reducing Gloucester, the one great fortress of Parliament in the west.

== Siege and relief of Gloucester ==
This decision quickly brought on a crisis. While the Earl of Manchester (with Cromwell as his lieutenant-general) was appointed to head the forces of the Eastern Association against Newcastle, and Waller was given a new army wherewith again to engage Hopton and Maurice, the task of saving Gloucester from the King's army fell to Essex. Essex was heavily reinforced and drew his army together for action in the last days of August. Resort was had to the press-gang to fill the ranks, and recruiting for Waller's new army was stopped. London sent six regiments of trained bands to the front, closing the shops so that every man should be free to take his part in what was thought to be the supreme trial of strength.

On the 26 August 1643, all being ready, Essex started. Through Aylesbury and round the north side of Oxford to Stow-on-the-Wold, the army moved resolutely, not deterred by want of food and rest, or by the attacks of Rupert's and Wilmot's horse on its flank. On 5 September, just as Gloucester was at the end of its resources, the siege of Gloucester was suddenly raised. The Royalists drew off to Painswick, for Essex had reached Cheltenham and the danger was over; the field armies, being again face to face, and free to move. There followed a series of skilful manoeuvres in the Severn and Avon valleys. At the end, the Parliamentary army gained a long start on its homeward road via Cricklade, Hungerford and Reading.

But the Royalist cavalry under Rupert, followed rapidly by Charles and the main body from Evesham, strained every nerve to head off Essex at Newbury. After a sharp skirmish on Aldbourne Chase on 18 September, they succeeded. On the 19th, the whole Royal army was drawn up, facing west, with its right on Newbury, and its left on Enborne Heath. Essex's men knew that evening that they would have to break through by force, there being no suggestion of surrender.

== First Battle of Newbury ==
The ground was densely intersected by hedges, except in front of the Royalists' left centre (Newbury Wash) and left (Enborne Heath). Practically, Essex's army was never formed in line of battle, for each unit was thrown into the fight as it came up its own road or lane.

On the left wing, in spite of the Royalist counter-strokes, the attack had the best of it, capturing field after field, and thus gradually gaining ground to the front. Here, Viscount Falkland was killed. On the Reading road itself Essex did not succeed in deploying on to the open ground on Newbury Wash, but victoriously repelled the royal horse when it charged up to the lanes and hedges held by his foot.

On the extreme right of the Parliamentary army, which stood in the open ground of Enborne Heath, took place a famous incident. Here, two of the London regiments, fresh to war as they were, were exposed to a trial as severe as that which broke down the veteran Spanish infantry at Rocroi in this same year. Rupert and the Royalist horse, again and again, charged up to the squares of pikes. Between each charge, his guns tried to disorder the Londoners, but it was not until the advance of the royal infantry that the trained bands retired, slowly and in magnificent order, to the edge of the heath.

The result was that Essex's army had fought its hardest, and failed to break the opposing line. But the Royalists had suffered so heavily, and above all, the valour displayed by the Parliamentarians had so profoundly impressed them, that they were glad to give up the disputed road, and withdraw into Newbury. Essex thereupon pursued his march. Reading was reached on 22 September 1643 after a small rearguard skirmish at Aldermaston, and so ended the First Battle of Newbury, one of the most dramatic episodes of English history.

== Hull and Winceby ==
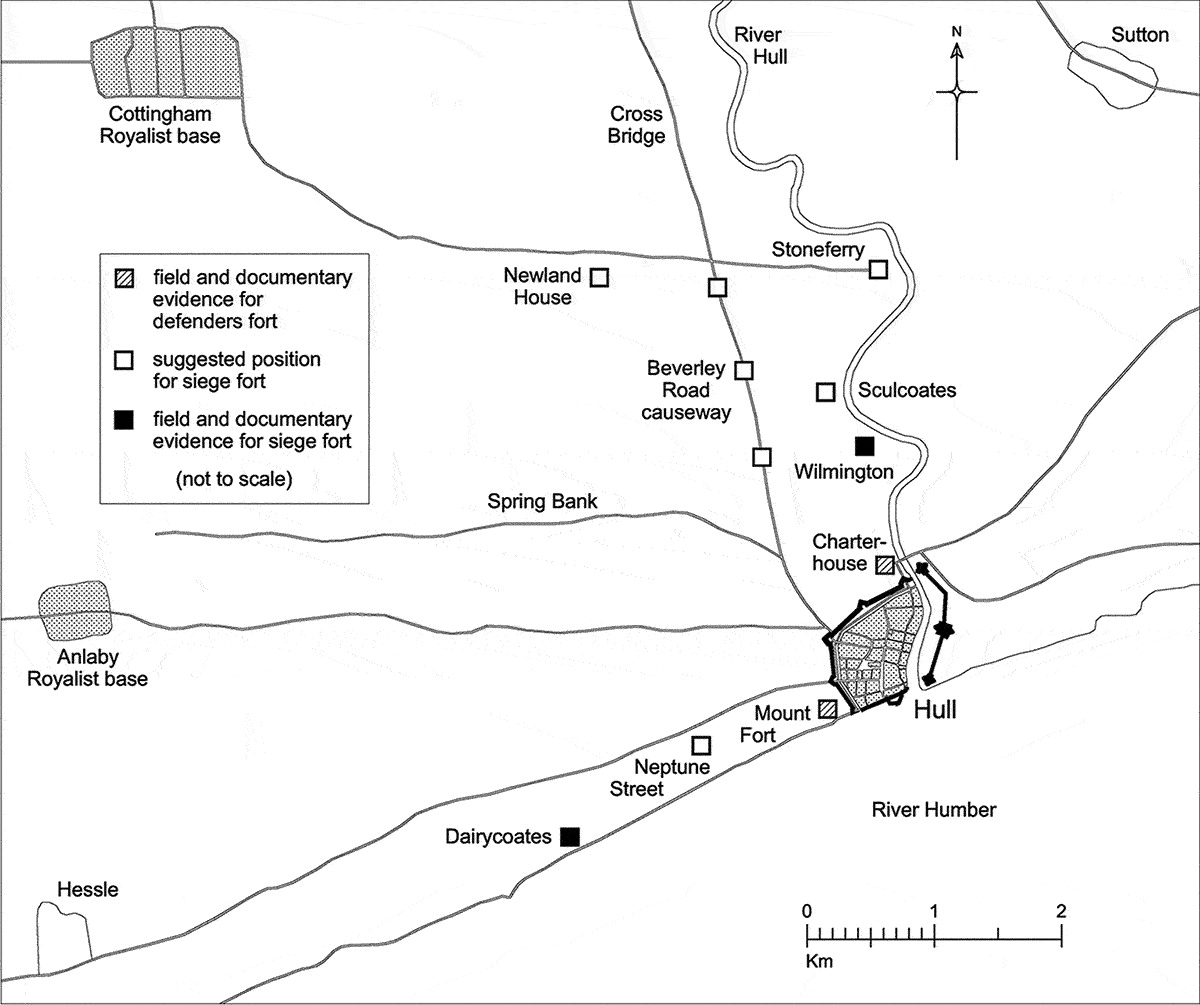
The position of siege forts around Hull in 1643

Meanwhile, the siege of Hull had commenced. The Eastern Association forces under Manchester promptly moved up into Lincolnshire, the foot besieging Lynn (which surrendered on 16 September 1643) while the horse rode into the northern part of the county to give a hand to the Fairfaxes. Fortunately the sea communications of Hull were open.

On 18 September, part of the cavalry in Hull was ferried over to Barton, and the rest under Sir Thomas Fairfax went by sea to Saltfleet a few days later, the whole joining Cromwell near Spilsby. In return, the old Lord Fairfax, who remained in Hull, received infantry reinforcements and a quantity of ammunition and stores from the Eastern Association.

On 11 October, Cromwell and Fairfax together won a brilliant cavalry action at the Battle of Winceby, driving the Royalist horse in confusion before them to Newark. On the same day, Newcastle's army around Hull, which had suffered terribly from the hardships of continuous siege work, was attacked by the garrison. They were so severely handled that the siege was given up the next day. Later, Manchester retook Lincoln and Gainsborough. Thus Lincolnshire, which had been almost entirely in Newcastle's hands before he was compelled to undertake the siege of Hull, was added, in fact as well as in name, to the Eastern Association.

Elsewhere, in the reaction after the crisis of Newbury, the war languished. The city regiments went home, leaving Essex too weak to hold Reading. The Royalists reoccupied it on 3 October. At this, the Londoners offered to serve again. They actually took part in a minor campaign around Newport Pagnell, where Rupert was attempting to fortify, as a menace to the Eastern Association and its communications with London.

Essex was successful in preventing this, but his London regiments again went home. Sir William Waller's new army in Hampshire failed lamentably in an attempt on Basing House on 7 November, the London-trained bands, deserting en bloc. Shortly afterwards, on 9 December, Arundel surrendered to a force under Sir Ralph, now Lord Hopton.

== The "Irish Cessation" and the Solemn League and Covenant ==
Politically, these months were the turning-point of the war. In Ireland, the King's lieutenant, by order of his master, made a truce with the Irish rebels on 15 September 1643. Charles's chief object was to set free his army to fight in England, but it was universally believed that Irish regiments in plain words, papists in arms, would shortly follow. Under these circumstances, his act united against him nearly every class in Protestant England, and brought into the English quarrel the armed strength of Presbyterian Scotland. Yet Charles, still trusting to intrigue and diplomacy to keep Scotland in check, deliberately rejected the advice of Montrose, his greatest and most faithful lieutenant, who wished to give the Scots employment for their army at home. Only ten days after the "Irish Cessation," Parliament at Westminster swore to the Solemn League and Covenant, and the die was cast.

It is true that even a semblance of Presbyterian theocracy put the "Independents" on their guard, and definitely raised the question of freedom of conscience. Secret negotiations were opened between the Independents and Charles on that basis. However, they soon discovered that the King was merely using them as instruments to bring about the betrayal of Aylesbury and other small rebel posts. All parties found it convenient to interpret the Covenant liberally for the present. At the beginning of 1644, the Parliamentary party showed so united a front that even Pym's death, on 8 December 1643, hardly affected its resolution to continue the struggle.

The troops from Ireland, thus obtained at the cost of an enormous political blunder, proved to be untrustworthy after all. Those serving in Hopton's army were "mutinous and shrewdly infected with the rebellious humour of England". When Waller's Londoners surprised and routed a Royalist detachment at Alton on 13 December 1643, half the prisoners took the Covenant.

== Notes ==
← 1642	First English Civil War	1644 →
