= First English Civil War, 1644 =

1644 was the third year of the First English Civil War. The King's position continued to decline and the Long Parliament sent the Propositions of Uxbridge, an attempt to end the war, to the king at Oxford.

== January and February 1644 ==
Hopton had to retire from the area around Arundel, and on 6 January 1644, Waller recaptured the town. Byron's Cheshire army was in no better case. Newcastle's retreat from Hull and the loss of Gainsborough had completely changed the situation in the Midlands. Brereton was joined by the younger Fairfax from Lincolnshire, and the Royalists were severely defeated for a second time at Nantwich on 25 January. As at Alton, the majority of the prisoners (amongst them, Colonel George Monck) took the Covenant and entered the Parliamentary army.

In Lancashire, as in Cheshire, Staffordshire, Nottinghamshire, and Lincolnshire, the cause of Parliament was in the ascendant. Resistance revived in the West Riding towns, Lord Fairfax was again in the field in the East Riding of Yorkshire, and even Newark was closely besieged by Sir John Meldrum. More important news came in from the north. The advanced guard of the Scottish army had passed the Tweed on 19 January, and Newcastle, with the remnant of his army, would soon be attacked in front and rear at once.

== Newark and Cheriton (March 1644) ==
As in 1643, Rupert was soon on his way to the north to retrieve the fortunes of his side. Moving by the Welsh border, and gathering up garrisons and recruits snowball-wise as he marched, he went first to Cheshire to give a hand to Byron, and then, with the utmost speed, he made for Newark. On 20 March 1644, he bivouacked at Bingham, and on the 21st, he not only relieved Newark but routed the besiegers' cavalry. On the 22nd, Meldrum's position was so hopeless that he capitulated on terms. But, brilliant soldier as he was, the prince was unable to do more than raid a few Parliamentary posts around Lincoln. After that, he had to return his borrowed forces to their various garrisons, and go back to Walesladen, indeed with captured pikes and muskets, to raise a permanent field army.

But Rupert could not be in all places at once. Newcastle was clamorous for aid. In Lancashire, only the countess of Derby, in Lathom House, held out for the King. Her husband pressed Rupert to go to her relief. Once, too, the prince was ordered back to Oxford to furnish a travelling escort for the queen, who shortly after this, gave birth to her youngest child and returned to France. The order was countermanded within a few hours, it is true, but Charles had good reason for avoiding detachments from his own army.

On 29 March, Hopton had undergone a severe defeat at Cheriton, near New Alresford. In the preliminary manoeuvres, and in the opening stages of the battle, the advantage lay with the Royalists. The Earl of Forth, who was present, was satisfied with what had been achieved, and tried to break off the action. But Royalist indiscipline ruined everything. A young cavalry colonel, charged in defiance of orders. A fresh engagement opened, and at the last moment, Waller snatched a victory out of defeat. Worse than this was the news from Yorkshire and Scotland. Charles had at last assented to Montrose's plan and promised him a marquessate. The first attempt to raise the Royalist standard in Scotland, however, gave no omen of its later triumphs.

In Yorkshire, Sir Thomas Fairfax, advancing from Lancashire through the West Riding, joined his father. Selby was stormed on 11 April and thereupon, Newcastle, who had been manoeuvring against the Scots in Durham, hastily drew back. He sent his cavalry away, and shut himself up with his foot in York. Two days later, the Scottish general, Alexander Leslie, Lord Leven, joined the Fairfaxes and prepared to invest that city.

== Plans of campaign for 1644 ==
The original plan of the Parliamentary "Committee of Both Kingdoms", which directed the military and civil policy of the allies after the fashion of a modern cabinet, was to combine Essex's and Manchester's armies in an attack upon the King's army. Aylesbury was appointed as the place of concentration. Waller's troops were to continue to drive back Hopton and to reconquer the west, Fairfax and the Scots, to invest Newcastle's army.

In the Midlands, Brereton and the Lincolnshire rebels could be counted upon to neutralise the one Byron, and the others, the Newark Royalists. But Waller, once more deserted by his trained bands, was unable to profit by his victory of Cheriton, and retired to Farnham. Manchester, too, was delayed because the Eastern Association was still suffering from the effects of Rupert's Newark exploit. Lincoln, abandoned by the rebels on that occasion, was not reoccupied till 6 May. Moreover, Essex found himself compelled to defend his conduct and motives to the "Committee of Both Kingdoms", and as usual, was straitened for men and money.

But though there were grave elements of weakness on the other side, the Royalists considered their own position to be hopeless. Prince Maurice was engaged in the fruitless siege of Lyme Regis. Gloucester was again a centre of activity and counterbalanced Newark, and the situation in the north was practically desperate. Rupert himself came to Oxford on 25 April 1644 to urge that his new army should be kept free to march to aid Newcastle. This was because Newscastle's army was now threatened, owing to the abandonment of the enemy's original plan by Manchester, as well as Fairfax and Leven.

There was no further talk of the concentric advance of three armies on London. The fiery prince and the methodical Earl of Forth (now honoured with the Earldom of Brentford) were at one, at least, in recommending that the Oxford area, with its own garrison and a mobile force, should be the pivot of the field armies' operations. Rupert, needing above all, adequate time for the development of the northern offensive, was not in favour of abandoning any of the barriers to Essex's advance. Brentford, on the other hand, thought it advisable to contract the lines of defence, and Charles, as usual undecided, agreed to Rupert's scheme and executed Brentford's. Reading, therefore, was dismantled early in May, and Abingdon given up shortly afterwards.

== Cropredy Bridge ==
It was now possible for the Roundheads to approach Oxford. Abingdon was no sooner evacuated than on 26 May 1644, Waller's and Essex's armies united there – still, unfortunately for their cause, under separate commanders. Edmund Ludlow joined Waller at Abingdon to place Oxford under siege. From Abingdon, Essex moved direct on Oxford. Waller moved towards Wantage, where he could give a hand to Edward Massey, the energetic governor of Gloucester.

Affairs seemed so bad in the west (Maurice, with a whole army, was still vainly besieging the single line of low breastworks that constituted the fortress of Lyme Regis) that the King dispatched Hopton to take charge of Bristol. Nor were things much better at Oxford. The barriers of time and space, and the supply area had been deliberately given up to the enemy. Charles was practically forced to undertake extensive field operations, with no hope of success, save in consequence of the enemy's mistakes.

The enemy, as it happened, did not disappoint him. The King, probably advised by Brentford, conducted a skilful war of manoeuvre in the area defined by Stourbridge, Gloucester, Abingdon and Northampton. At the end, Essex marched off into the west with most of the general service troops to repeat at Lyme Regis, his Gloucester exploit of 1643, leaving Waller to the secondary work of keeping the King away from Oxford and reducing that fortress.

At one moment, indeed, Charles (then in Bewdley) rose to the idea of marching north to join Rupert and Newcastle, but he soon made up his mind to return to Oxford. From Bewdley, therefore, he moved to Buckingham, the distant threat on London, producing another evanescent citizen army drawn from six counties under Major-General Browne. Waller followed him closely. When the King turned upon Browne's motley host, Waller appeared in time to avert disaster, and the two armies worked away to the upper Cherwell.

Brentford and Waller were excellent strategists of the 17th century type, and neither would fight a pitched battle without every chance in his favour. Eventually on 29 June, the Royalists were successful in a series of minor fights about Cropredy Bridge. The result was, in accordance with continental custom, admitted to be an important victory, though Waller's main army drew off unharmed. In the meantime, on 15 June, Essex had relieved Lyme Regis and occupied Weymouth, and was preparing to go farther. The two rebel armies were now indeed separate. Waller had been left to do as best he could, and a worse fate was soon to overtake the cautious earl.

== Campaign of Marston Moor ==
During these manoeuvres, the northern campaign had been fought to an issue. Rupert's courage and energy were more likely to command success in the "English Civil War" than all the conscientious caution of an Essex or a Brentford. On 16 May 1644, Rupert left Shrewsbury to fight his way through hostile country to Lancashire, where he hoped to re-establish the Derby influence and raise new forces. Stockport was plundered on the 25th, and the besiegers of Lathom House, utterly defeated at Bolton on 28 May. Soon afterwards, he received a large reinforcement under General George Goring, which included 5,000 of Newcastle's cavalry.

The capture of the almost defenceless town of Liverpool, undertaken as usual to allay local fears, did not delay Rupert more than three or four days. He then turned towards the Yorkshire border with greatly augmented forces. On 14 June, he received a despatch from the King, the gist of which was that there was a time-limit imposed on the northern enterprise. If York were lost or did not need his help, Rupert was to make all haste southward via Worcester. "If York be relieved and you beat the rebels' armies of both kingdoms, then, but otherways not, I may possibly make a shift upon the defensive to spin out time until you come to assist me".

Charles did manage to spin out time. But it was of capital importance that Rupert had to do his work upon York and the allied army in the shortest possible time. According to the despatch, there were only two ways of saving the royal cause, "having relieved York by beating the Scots", or marching with all speed to Worcester. Rupert's duty, interpreted through the medium of his temperament, was clear enough. Newcastle still held out, his men having been encouraged by a small success on 17 June, and Rupert reached Knaresborough on the 30th.

At once, Leven, Fairfax and Manchester broke up the siege of York and moved out to meet him. But the prince, moving still at high speed, rode round their right flank via Boroughbridge and Thornton Bridge, and entered York on the north side. Newcastle tried to dissuade Rupert from fighting, but his record as a general was scarcely convincing as to the value of his advice. Rupert curtly replied that he had orders to fight, and the Royalists moved out towards Marston Moor on the morning of 2 July 1644.

The Parliamentary commanders, fearing a fresh manoeuvre, had already begun to retire towards Tadcaster, but as soon as it became evident that a battle was impending, they turned back. The battle of Marston Moor began at about four in the afternoon. It was the first real trial of strength between the best elements on either side, and it ended before night with the complete victory of the Parliamentary armies. The Royalist cause in the north collapsed once and for all. Newcastle fled to the continent, and only Rupert, resolute as ever, extricated 6,000 cavalry from the debacle, and rode away whence he had come, still the dominant figure of the war.

== Independency ==
The victory gave Parliament entire control of the north, but it did not lead to the definitive solution of the political problem. In fact, on the question of Charles's place in a new Constitution, the victorious generals quarrelled, even before York had surrendered. Within three weeks of the battle, the great army was broken up.

The Yorkshire troops proceeded to conquer the isolated Royalist posts in their county. The Scots marched off to besiege Newcastle-on-Tyne and to hold in check a nascent Royalist army in Westmorland. Rupert, in Lancashire, they neglected entirely. Manchester and Cromwell, already estranged, marched away into the Eastern Association. There, for want of an enemy to fight, their army was forced to be idle. Cromwell, and the ever-growing Independent element, quickly came to suspect their commander of lukewarmness in the cause. Waller's army, too, was spiritless and immobile.

On 2 July 1644, despairing of the existing military system, Cromwell made to the "Committee of Both Kingdoms", the first suggestion of the New Model Army. "My lords," he wrote, "till you have an army merely your own, that you may command, it is . . . impossible to do anything of importance." Browne's trained band army was perhaps the most ill-behaved of all. Once, the soldiers attempted to murder their own general. Parliament, in alarm, set about the formation of a new general service force on 12 July. Meanwhile, both Waller's and Browne's armies, at Abingdon and Reading respectively, ignominiously collapsed by mutiny and desertion.

It was evident that the people at large, with their respect for the law and their anxiety for their own homes, were tired of the war. Only those men, such as Cromwell, who has set their hearts on fighting out the quarrel of conscience, kept steadfastly to their purpose. Cromwell himself had already decided that the King himself must be deprived of his authority, and his supporters were equally convinced. But they were relatively few. Even the Eastern Association trained bands had joined in the disaffection in Waller's army. The unfortunate general's suggestion of a professional army, with all its dangers, indicated the only means of enforcing a peace, such as Cromwell and his friends desired.

There was this important difference, however, between Waller's idea and Cromwell's achievement that the professional soldiers of the New Model were disciplined, led, and in all things, inspired by "godly" officers. Godliness, devotion to the cause, and efficiency were indeed the only criteria Cromwell applied in choosing officers. Long before this, he had warned the Scottish major-general, Lawrence Crawford, that the precise colour of a man's religious opinions mattered nothing, compared with his devotion to them. He had told the committee of Suffolk:

"I had rather have a plain russet-coated captain that knows what he fights for and loves what he knows than that which you call a 'gentleman' and is nothing else. I honour a gentleman that is so indeed... but seeing it was necessary the work must go on, better plain men than none."

If "men of honour and birth" possessed the essentials of godliness, devotion, and capacity, Cromwell preferred them. As a matter of fact, only seven out of thirty-seven of the superior officers of the original New Model were not of gentle birth.

== Lostwithiel ==
But all this was as yet in the future. Essex's military promenade in the west of England was the subject of immediate interest. At first successful, this general penetrated to Plymouth, whence, securely based as he thought, he could overrun Devon. Unfortunately for him, he was persuaded to overrun Cornwall as well. At once, the Cornishmen rose, as they had risen under Hopton, and the King was soon on the march from the Oxford region, disregarding the armed mobs under Waller and Browne.

Their state reflected the general languishing of the war spirit on both sides, not on one only, as Charles discovered when he learned that Lord Wilmot, the lieutenant-general of his horse, was in correspondence with Essex. Wilmot was of course placed under arrest, and was replaced by the dissolute General Goring. But it was unpleasantly evident that even gay cavaliers of the type of Wilmot had lost the ideals for which they fought. Wilmot had come to believe that the realm would never be at peace while Charles was King.

Henceforward, it will be found that the Royalist foot, now a thoroughly professional force, is superior in quality to the once superb cavalry, and not merely because its opportunities for plunder, etc. are more limited. Materially, however, the immediate victory was undeniably with the Royalists. After a brief period of manoeuvre, the Parliamentary army, now far from Plymouth, found itself surrounded and starving at Lostwithiel, on the Fowey river, without hope of assistance. The horse cut its way out through the investing circle of posts. Essex himself escaped by sea, but Major-General Philip Skippon, his second in command, had to surrender with the whole of the foot on 2 September 1644. The officers and men were allowed to go free to Portsmouth, but their arms, guns and munitions were the spoil of the victors.

There was now no trustworthy field force in arms for Parliament south of the Humber. Even the Eastern Association army was distracted by its religious differences, which had now at last come definitely to the front and absorbed the political dispute in a wider issue. Cromwell already proposed to abolish the peerage, the members of which were inclined to make a hollow peace. He had ceased to pay the least respect to his general, Manchester, whose scheme for the solution of the quarrel was an impossible combination of Charles and Presbyterianism. Manchester, for his part, sank into a state of mere obstinacy. He refused to move against Rupert, or even to besiege Newark, and actually threatened to hang Colonel Lilburne for capturing a Royalist castle without orders.

== Operations of Essex's, Waller's and Manchester's armies ==
After the success of Lostwithiel, there was little to detain Charles's main army in the extreme west. Meanwhile, Banbury, a most important point in the Oxford circle, and Basing House (near Basingstoke) were in danger of capture. Waller, who had organised a small force of reliable troops, had already sent cavalry into Dorsetshire with the idea of assisting Essex. He now came himself with reinforcements to prevent, so far as lay in his power, the King's return to the Thames valley.

Charles was accompanied, of course, only by his permanent forces and by parts of Prince Maurice's and Hopton's armies. The Cornish levies had, as usual, scattered as soon as the war receded from their borders. Manchester slowly advanced to Reading, while Essex gradually reorganised his broken army at Portsmouth. Waller, far out to the west at Shaftesbury, endeavored to gain the necessary time and space for a general concentration in Wiltshire, where Charles would be far from Oxford and Basing and, in addition, outnumbered by two to one.

But the work of rearming Essex's troops proceeded slowly for want of money. Manchester peevishly refused to be hurried, either by his more vigorous subordinates or by the "Committee of Both Kingdoms", saying that the army of the Eastern Association was for the guard of its own employers, and not for general service. He pleaded the renewed activity of the Newark Royalists as his excuse, forgetting that Newark would have been in his hands ere this, had he chosen to move thither, instead of lying idle for two months.

As to the higher command, things had come to such a pass that, when the three armies at last united, a council of war, consisting of three army commanders, several senior officers, and two civilian delegates from the committee, was constituted. When the vote of the majority had determined what was to be done, Essex, as lord general of the Parliament's first army, was to issue the necessary orders for the whole. Under such conditions, it was not likely that Waller's hopes of a great battle at Shaftesbury would be realised.

On 8 October 1644, Waller fell back, the royal army following him step by step and finally reaching Whitchurch on 10 October. Manchester arrived at Basingstoke on the 17th, Waller on the 19th, and Essex on the 21st. Charles had found that he could not relieve Basing (a mile or two from Basingstoke), without risking a battle with the enemy between himself and Oxford. He therefore took the Newbury road and relieved Donnington Castle, near Newbury, on the 22nd.

Three days later, Banbury too was relieved by a force which could now be spared from the Oxford garrison. But for once, the council of war on the other side was for fighting a battle. The Parliamentary armies, their spirits revived by the prospect of action, and by the news of the fall of Newcastle-on-Tyne and the defeat of a sally from Newark, marched briskly. On 26 October, they appeared north of Newbury on the Oxford road. Like Essex in 1643, Charles found himself headed off from the shelter of friendly fortresses. Beyond this fact there is little similarity between the two battles of Newbury, for the Royalists, in the first case, merely drew a barrier across Essex's path. On the present occasion, the eager Parliamentarians made no attempt to force the King to attack them. They were well content to attack him in his chosen position themselves, especially as he was better off for supplies and quarters than they.

== Second Battle of Newbury ==
The Second Battle of Newbury, fought on 27 October 1644, is remarkable as being the first great manoeuvre-battle (as distinct from "pitched" battle) of the Civil War. A preliminary reconnaissance by the Parliamentary leaders (Essex was not present, owing to illness) established the fact that the King's infantry held a strong line of defence behind the Lambourn brook, from Shaw (inclusive) to Donnington (exclusive). Shaw House and adjacent buildings were being held as an advanced post. In rear of the centre, in open ground just north of Newbury, lay the bulk of the royal cavalry. In the left rear of the main line, and separated from it by more than a thousand yards, lay Prince Maurice's corps at Speen, and advanced troops on the high ground, west of that village. Donnington Castle, under its energetic governor, Sir John Boys, however, formed a strong post covering this gap with artillery fire.

The Parliamentary leaders had no intention of flinging their men away in a frontal attack on the line of the Lambourn. A flank attack from the east side could hardly succeed, owing to the obstacle presented by the confluence of the Lambourn and the Kennet. Hence, they decided on a wide turning movement via Chieveley, Winterbourne and Wickham Heath, against Prince Maurice's position. The decision, daring and energetic as it was, led only to a moderate success, for reasons which will appear. The flank march, out of range of the castle, was conducted with punctuality and precision.

The troops composing it were drawn from all three armies, and led by the best fighting generals, Waller, Cromwell, and Essex's subordinates, Balfour and Skippon. Manchester, at Clay Hill, was to stand fast until the turning movement had developed, and to make a vigorous holding attack on Shaw House, as soon as Waller's guns were heard at Speen. But there was no commander-in-chief to co-ordinate the movements of the two widely separated corps, and consequently no co-operation.

Waller's attack was not unexpected, and Prince Maurice had made ready to meet him. Yet, the first rush of the rebels carried the entrenchments of Speen Hill. Speen itself, though stoutly defended, fell into their hands within an hour, Essex's infantry recapturing here some of the guns they had had to surrender at Lostwithiel. But meantime, Manchester, in spite of the entreaties of his staff, had not stirred from Clay Hill. He had already made one false attack early in the morning, and been severely handled, he was aware of his own deficiencies as a general.

A year before this, Manchester would have asked for and acted upon the advice of a capable soldier, such as Cromwell or Crawford. Now, however, his mind was warped by a desire for peace on any terms, and he sought only to avoid defeat, pending a happy solution of the quarrel. Those who sought to gain peace through victory were, meanwhile, driving Maurice back from hedge to hedge towards the open ground at Newbury. But every attempt to emerge from the lanes and fields was repulsed by the royal cavalry, and indeed, by every available man and horse. Charles's officers had gauged Manchester's intentions, and almost stripped the front of its defenders to stop Waller's advance. Nightfall put an end to the struggle around Newbury, and then too late, Manchester ordered the attack on Shaw House. It failed completely, in spite of the gallantry of his men, and darkness being then complete, it was not renewed.

In its general course, the battle closely resembled that of the battle of Freiburg, fought the same year on the Rhine. But, if Waller's part in the battle corresponded in a measure to Turenne's, Manchester was unequal to playing the part of Conde. Consequently, the results, in the case of the French, who won by three days of hard fighting, and even then comparatively small, were in the case of the English, practically nil. During the night, the royal army quietly marched away through the gap between Waller's and Manchester's troops. The heavy artillery and stores were left in Donnington Castle. Charles himself with a small escort rode off to the north-west to meet Rupert, and the main body gained Wallingford unmolested.

An attempt at pursuit was made by Waller and Cromwell, with all the cavalry they could lay hands on. It was, however, unsupported, for the council of war had decided to content itself with besieging Donnington Castle. A little later, after a brief and half-hearted attempt to move towards Oxford, it referred to the committee for further instructions. Within the month, Charles, having joined Rupert at Oxford and made him general of the Royalist forces vice Brentford, reappeared in the neighbourhood of Newbury.

Donnington Castle was again relieved on 9 November, under the eyes of the Parliamentary army, which was in such a miserable condition that even Cromwell was against fighting. Some manoeuvres followed, in the course of which, Charles relieved Basing House. The Parliamentary armies fell back, not in the best order, to Reading. The season for field warfare was now far spent, and the royal army retired to enjoy good quarters and plentiful supplies around Oxford.

== Self-denying ordinance ==
On the other side, the dissensions between the generals had become flagrant and public. It was no longer possible for the Houses of Parliament to ignore the fact that the army must be radically reformed. Cromwell and Waller, from their places in parliament, attacked Manchester's conduct. So far as Cromwell was concerned, their attack ultimately became an attack on the Lords, most of whom held the same views as Manchester, and on the Scots, who attempted to bring Cromwell to trial as an "incendiary". At the crisis of their bitter controversy, Cromwell suddenly proposed to stifle all animosities by the resignation of all officers who were members of either House, a proposal which affected himself not less than Essex and Manchester.

The first "self-denying ordinance" was moved on 9 December 1644, and provided that "no member of either house shall have or execute any office or command...", etc. This was not accepted by the Lords. In the end, a second "self-denying ordinance" was agreed to on 3 April 1645, whereby all the persons concerned were to resign, but without prejudice to their reappointment. Simultaneously with this, the formation of the New Model was at last definitely taken into consideration. The last exploit of Sir William Waller, who was not re-employed after the passing of the ordinance, was the relief of Taunton, then besieged by General Goring's army. Cromwell served as his lieutenant-general on this occasion. We have Waller's own testimony that he was, in all things, a wise, capable and respectful subordinate. Under a leader of the stamp of Waller, Cromwell was well satisfied to obey, knowing the cause to be in good hands.

== Decline of the Royalist cause ==
A raid of Goring's horse from the west into Surrey, and an unsuccessful attack on General Browne at Abingdon, were the chief enterprises undertaken on the side of the Royalists during the early winter of 1644/45. It was no longer "summer in Devon, summer in Yorkshire" as in January 1643. An ever-growing section of Royalists, amongst whom Rupert himself was soon to be numbered, were for peace. Many scores of loyalist gentlemen, impoverished by the loss of three years rents of their estates, and hopeless of ultimate victory, were making their way to Westminster to give in their submission to Parliament and to pay their fines. In such circumstances, the old decision-seeking strategy was impossible.

The new plan, suggested probably by Rupert, had already been tried with strategic success in the summer campaign of 1644. It consisted essentially in using Oxford as the centre of a circle and striking out radially at any favourable target — "manoeuvring about a fixed point," as Napoleon called it.

It was significant of the decline of the Royalist cause that the "fixed point" had been, in 1643, the King's field army, based indeed on its great entrenched camp, Banbury–Cirencester–Reading–Oxford, but free to move and to hold the enemy, wherever met. But now, it was the entrenched camp itself, weakened by the loss or abandonment of its outer posts, and without the power of binding the enemy, if they chose to ignore its existence, that conditioned the scope and duration of the single remaining field army's enterprises.

== New-model ordinance ==
For the present, however, Charles's cause was crumbling, more from internal weakness than from the blows of the enemy. Fresh negotiations for peace which opened on 29 January 1645 at Uxbridge (by the name of which place, they are known to history) occupied the attention of the Scots and their Presbyterian friends. The rise of Independency, and of Cromwell, was a further distraction. The Lords and Commons were seriously at variance over the new army, and the Self-denying Ordinance.

But in February, a fresh mutiny in Waller's command struck alarm into the hearts of the disputants. The "treaty" of Uxbridge came to the same end as the treaty of Oxford in 1643, and a settlement as to army reform was achieved on 15 February. Though it was only on 25 March that the second and modified form of the ordinance was agreed to by both Houses, Sir Thomas Fairfax and Philip Skippon (who were not members of parliament) had been approved as lord general and major-general (of the infantry) respectively of the new army as early as 21 January. The post of lieutenant-general and cavalry commander was for the moment left vacant, but there was little doubt as to who would eventually occupy it.

== Notes ==
← 1643	First English Civil War	1645 →
