= Clattercote Priory =

Gilbertine priory in Oxfordshire, England

Coordinates: 52°08′22″N 1°19′55″W

Clattercote Priory was a Gilbertine priory in Oxfordshire, England.

It was founded for Gilbertine canons to run a hospital in the mid-twelfth century, possibly by Robert de Chesney. The hospital ceased before 1262. The priory was re-established 1251–1262, later dissolved in 1538, and granted to Thomas Lee around 1559. In the 16th century, the priory fell into disrepair and was later pulled down; a manor house was built on its site in the 17th century.
