= First English Civil War, 1645 =

Year in the First English Civil War

1645 was the fourth year of the First English Civil War. By the beginning of 1645 the war was going badly for Charles I and the campaigns of 1645 did not see a recovery in his prospects.

== New-model ordinance ==
For the present, Charles's cause was crumbling, more from internal weakness than from the blows of the enemy. Fresh negotiations for peace which opened on 29 January 1645 at Uxbridge (by the name of which place, they are known to history) occupied the attention of the Scots and their Presbyterian friends. The rise of Independency, and of Cromwell, was a further distraction. The Lords and Commons were seriously at variance over the new army, and the Self-denying Ordinance.

But in February, a fresh mutiny in Waller's command struck alarm into the hearts of the disputants. The "treaty" of Uxbridge came to the same end as the treaty of Oxford in 1643, and a settlement as to army reform was achieved on 15 February. Though it was only on 25 March that the second and modified form of the ordinance was agreed to by both Houses, Sir Thomas Fairfax and Philip Skippon (who were not members of parliament) had been approved as lord general and major-general (of the infantry) respectively of the new army as early as 21 January. The post of lieutenant-general and cavalry commander was for the moment left vacant, but there was little doubt as to who would eventually occupy it.

== Organisation of the New Model Army ==
The New Model Army's first necessity was regular pay; its first duty to serve wherever it might be sent. Of the three armies that had fought at Newbury, only one, Essex's, was in a true sense a general service force; and only one, Manchester's, was paid with any regularity. Waller's army was no better paid than Essex's, and no freer from local ties than Manchester's. It was therefore broken up early in April, and only 600 of its infantry passed into the New Model. Essex's men, on the other hand, wanted but regular pay and strict officers to make them excellent soldiers. Their own major-general, Skippon, managed by tact and his personal popularity, to persuade the bulk of the men to rejoin. Manchester's army, in which Cromwell had been the guiding influence from first to last, was naturally the backbone of the New Model.

Early in April 1645, Essex, Manchester, and Waller resigned their commissions in anticipation of the passing by Parliament of the self-denying ordinance. Those in the forces, who were not embodied in the new army, were sent to do local duties, for minor armies were still maintained — General Sydnam Poyntz's in the north Midlands; General Edward Massey's in the Severn valley; a large force in the Eastern Association; General Browne's in Buckinghamshire, etc., — besides the Scots in the north.

The New Model originally consisted of 14,400 foot and 7,700 horse and dragoons. Of the infantry, only 6,000 came from the combined armies, the rest being new recruits furnished by the 'press'. Thus, there was considerable trouble during the first months of Fairfax's command, and discipline had to be enforced with unusual sternness. As for the enemy, Oxford was openly contemptuous of "the rebels' new brutish general" and his men, who seemed hardly likely to succeed, where Essex and Waller had failed. But the effect of Parliament having "an army all its own" was soon to be apparent.

== First operations of 1645 ==
On the Royalist side, the campaign of 1645 opened in the west, where Charles II, the young prince of Wales was sent with Hyde (later, Earl of Clarendon), Hopton, and others as his advisers. General (Lord) Goring, however, now in command of the Royalist field forces in this quarter, was truculent, insubordinate and dissolute. On the rare occasions when he did his duty, however, he did display a certain degree of skill and leadership, and the influence of the prince's counsellors was but small.

As usual, operations began with the sieges, necessary to conciliate local feeling. Plymouth and Lyme Regis were blocked up, and Taunton again invested. The reinforcement thrown into the last place by Waller and Cromwell was dismissed by Blake (then a colonel in command of the fortress (afterwards, the great admiral of the Commonwealth). After many adventures, Blake rejoined Waller and Cromwell. The latter generals, who had not yet laid down their commissions, then engaged Goring for some weeks. Neither side had infantry or artillery, and both found subsistence difficult in February and March. In a country that had been fought over for the two years past, no results were to be expected. Taunton still remained unrelieved, and Goring's horse still rode all over Dorsetshire, when the New Model at last took the field.

== Rupert's northern march ==
In the Midlands and Lancashire, the Royalist horse, as ill-behaved even as Goring's men, were directly responsible for the ignominious failure with which the King's main army began its year's work. Prince Maurice was joined at Ludlow by Rupert and part of his Oxford army, early in March 1645. The brothers drove off Brereton from the siege of Beeston Castle, and relieved the pressure on Lord Byron in Cheshire. So great was the danger of Rupert's again invading Lancashire and Yorkshire that all available forces in the north, English and Scots, were ordered to march against him. But at this moment the prince was called back to clear his line of retreat on Oxford.

The Herefordshire and Worcestershire peasantry, weary of military exactions, were in arms. Though they would not join Parliament, and for the most part dispersed after stating their grievances, the main enterprise was wrecked. This was but one of many ill-armed crowds, the "Clubmen" as they were called, that assembled to enforce peace on both parties. A few regular soldiers were sufficient to disperse them in all cases, but their attempt to establish a third party in England was morally as significant as it was materially futile.

The Royalists were now fighting with the courage of despair. Those who still fought against Charles did so with the full determination to ensure the triumph of their cause, and with the conviction that the only possible way was the annihilation of the enemy's armed forces. The majority, however, were so weary of the war that the Earl of Manchester's Presbyterian royalism, which had contributed so materially to the prolongation of the struggle, would probably have been accepted by four-fifths of all England as the basis of a peace. It was, in fact, in the face of almost universal opposition, that Fairfax and Cromwell and their friends at Westminster guided the cause of their weaker comrades to complete victory.

== Cromwell's raid ==
Having without difficulty, rid himself of the Clubmen, Rupert was eager to resume his march into the north. It is unlikely that he wished to join Montrose in Scotland, though Charles himself favoured that plan. However, he certainly intended to fight the Scottish army, more especially as after the Covenanter's defeat at the Scottish Battle of Inverlochy, the Scottish army in England had been called upon to detach a large force to deal with Montrose. But this time there was no Royalist army in the north to provide infantry and guns for a pitched battle. Rupert had perforce to wait near Hereford till the main body, and in particular the artillery train, could come from Oxford and join him.

It was on the march of the artillery train to Hereford that the first operations of the New Model centred. The infantry was not yet ready to move, in spite of all Fairfax's and Skippon's efforts. It became necessary to send the cavalry, by itself, to prevent Rupert from gaining a start. Cromwell, then under Waller's command, had come to Windsor to resign his commission, as required by the Self-denying Ordinance. Instead, he was placed at the head of a brigade of his own old soldiers, with orders to stop the march of the artillery train.

On 23 April 1645, Cromwell started from Watlington, north-westward. At dawn on the 24th, he routed a detachment of Royalist horse at Islip. On the same day, though he had no guns and only a few firearms in the whole force, he terrified the governor of Bletchingdon House into surrender. Riding thence to Witney, Cromwell won another cavalry fight at Bampton-in-the-Bush on the 27th, and attacked Faringdon House, though without success, on 29 April. From there, he marched at leisure to Newbury. He had done his work thoroughly. He had demoralised the Royalist cavalry, and, above all, had carried off every horse on the countryside. To all Rupert's entreaties, Charles could only reply that the guns could not be moved till the 7 May, and he even summoned Goring's cavalry from the west to make good his losses.

== Civilian strategy ==
Cromwell's success thus forced the King to concentrate his various armies in the neighbourhood of Oxford. The New Model had, so Fairfax and Cromwell hoped, found its target. But the "Committee of Both Kingdoms" on the one side, and Charles, Rupert, and Goring, on the other, held different views. On 1 May 1645, Fairfax, having been ordered to relieve Taunton, set out from Windsor for the long march to that place. Meeting Cromwell at Newbury on 2 May, he directed the lieutenant-general to watch the movements of the King's army. He himself marched on to Blandford, which he reached on 7 May. Thus, Fairfax and the main army of Parliament were marching away in the west, while Cromwell's detachment was left, as Waller had been left the previous year, to hold the King, as best he could.

On the very evening that Cromwell's raid ended, the leading troops of Goring's command destroyed part of Cromwell's own regiment near Faringdon. On 3 May Rupert and Maurice appeared with a force of all arms at Burford. Yet the "Committee of Both Kingdoms", though aware on the 29th of Goring's move, only made up its mind to stop Fairfax on the 3rd, and did not send off orders till the 5th. These orders were to the effect that a detachment was to be sent to the relief of Taunton, and that the main army was to return. Fairfax gladly obeyed, even though a siege of Oxford, and not the enemy's field army, was the objective assigned him. But long before he came up to the Thames valley, the situation was again changed.

Rupert, now in possession of the guns and their teams, urged upon his uncle the resumption of the northern enterprise, calculating that with Fairfax in Somersetshire, Oxford was safe. Charles accordingly marched out of Oxford on the 7th towards Stow-on-the-Wold, on the very day, as it chanced, that Fairfax began his return march from Blandford. However, Goring and most of the other generals were for a march into the west, in the hope of dealing with Fairfax as they had dealt with Essex in 1644. The armies therefore parted, as Essex and Waller had parted at the same place in 1644. Rupert and the King were to march northward, while Goring was to return to his independent command in the west.

Rupert, not unnaturally, wishing to keep his influence with the King and his authority as general of the King's army, unimpaired by Goring's notorious indiscipline, made no attempt to prevent the separation, which in the event proved wholly unprofitable. The flying column from Blandford relieved Taunton long before Goring's return to the west. Colonel Weldon and Colonel Graves, its commanders, set him at defiance even in the open country. As for Fairfax, he was out of Goring's reach, preparing for the siege of Oxford.

== Charles in the Midlands ==
On the other side also, the generals were working by data that had ceased to have any value. Fairfax's siege of Oxford, ordered by the Committee on 10 May 1645, and persisted in, after it was known that the King was on the move, was the second great blunder of the year. The blunder was hardly redeemed, as a military measure, by the visionary scheme of assembling the Scots, the Yorkshiremen, and the midland forces to oppose the King. It is hard to understand how, having created a new model army, "all its own" for general service, Parliament at once tied it down to a local enterprise, and trusted an improvised army of local troops to fight the enemy's main army.

In reality, the Committee seems to have been misled by false information to the effect that Goring and the governor of Oxford were about to declare for Parliament. Had they not dispatched Fairfax to the relief of Taunton in the first instance, the necessity for such intrigues would not have arisen. However, Fairfax obeyed orders, invested Oxford, and so far as he was able, without a proper siege train, besieged it for two weeks, while Charles and Rupert ranged the Midlands unopposed.

At the end of that time came news, so alarming that the Committee hastily abdicated their control over military operations, and gave Fairfax a free hand. "Black Tom" gladly and instantly abandoned the siege and marched northward to give battle to the King. Meanwhile, Charles and Rupert were moving northward. On 11 May, they reached Droitwich, from where after two days' rest they marched against Brereton. The latter hurriedly raised the sieges he had on hand, and called upon Yorkshire and the Scottish army there for aid. But only the old Lord Fairfax and the Yorkshiremen responded. Leven had just heard of new victories, won by Montrose. He could do no more than draw his army and his guns over the Pennine chain into Westmorland, in the hope of being in time to bar the King's march on Scotland via Carlisle.

== Campaign of Naseby ==
If the news of Auldearn brought Leven to the region of Carlisle, it had little effect on his English allies. Fairfax was not yet released from the siege of Oxford, in spite of the protests of the Scottish representatives in London. Massey, the active and successful governor of Gloucester, was placed in command of a field force on 25 May 1645, but he was to lead it against, not the King, but Goring. At that moment the military situation once more changed abruptly. Charles, instead of continuing his march on to Lancashire, turned due eastward towards Derbyshire. The alarm at Westminster when this new development was reported was such that Cromwell, in spite of the Self-Denying Ordinance, was sent to raise an army for the defence of the Eastern Association. Yet the Royalists had no intentions in that direction. Conflicting reports as to the condition of Oxford reached the royal headquarters in the last week of May, and the eastward march was made chiefly to "spin out time" until it could be known whether it would be necessary to return to Oxford, or whether it was still possible to fight Leven in Yorkshire his move into Westmorland was not yet known and invade Scotland by the easy east coast route.

Goring's return to the west had already been countermanded and he had been directed to march to Harborough, while the South Wales Royalists were also called in towards Leicester. Later orders on 26 May directed him to Newbury, whence he was to feel the strength of the enemy's positions around Oxford. It is hardly necessary to say that Goring found good military reasons for continuing his independent operations, and marched off towards Taunton regardless of the order. He redressed the balance there for the moment by overawing Massey's weak force, and his purse profited considerably by fresh opportunities for extortion, but he and his men were not at Naseby. Meanwhile, the King, at the geographical centre of England, found an important and wealthy town at his mercy. Rupert, always for action, took the opportunity, and Leicester was stormed and thoroughly pillaged on the night of the 30 May–31 May.

There was the usual panic at Westminster, but, unfortunately for Charles, it resulted in Fairfax being directed to abandon the siege of Oxford and given carte blanche to bring the Royal army to battle wherever it was met. On his side the King had, after the capture of Leicester, accepted the advice of those who feared for the safety of Oxford. Rupert, though commander-in-chief, was unable to insist on the northern enterprise and had marched to Daventry, where he halted to throw supplies into Oxford.

Thus Fairfax in his turn was free to move, thanks to the insubordination of Goring, who would neither relieve Oxford nor join the King for an attack on the New Model. The Parliamentary general moved from Oxford towards Northampton so as to cover the Eastern Association. On 12 June the two armies were only a few miles apart, Fairfax at Kislingbury, Charles at Daventry, and, though the Royalists turned northward again on the 13th to resume the Yorkshire project under the very eyes of the enemy, Fairfax followed close. On the night of the 13th Charles slept at Lubenham, Fairfax at Guilsborough. Cromwell, just appointed lieutenant-general of the New Model, had ridden into camp on the morning of the 13th with fresh cavalry from the eastern counties, Colonel Rossiter came up with more from Lincolnshire on the morning of the battle, and it was with an incontestable superiority of numbers and an overwhelming morale advantage that Fairfax fought at Naseby (q.v.) on 14 June. The result of the battle, this time a decisive battle, was the annihilation of the Royal army. Part of the cavalry escaped, a small fraction of it in tolerable order, but the guns and the baggage train were taken, and, above all, the splendid Royal infantry were killed or taken prisoners to a man.

== Effects of Naseby ==
After Naseby, though the war dragged on for another year, the King never succeeded in raising an army as good as, or even more numerous, than that, which Fairfax's army had so heavily outnumbered on 14 June 1645. That the fruits of the victory could not be gathered in a few weeks was due to a variety of hindrances (rather than to direct opposition):

- the absence of rapid means of communication;
- the paucity of the forces engaged on both sides, relative to the total numbers under arms; and
- from time to time, to the political exigencies of the growing quarrel between Presbyterians and Independents.

As to the latter, within a few days of Naseby, the Scots rejoiced that the "back of the malignants was broken". They demanded reinforcements, as a precaution against "the insolence of others", i.e., Cromwell and the Independents, "to whom alone the Lord has given the victory of that day".

Leven had by now returned to Yorkshire, and a fortnight after Naseby, Carlisle fell to David Leslie's besieging corps, after a long and honourable defence by Sir Thomas Glemham. Leicester was reoccupied by Fairfax on the 18th, and on the 20th, Leven's army, moving slowly southward, reached Mansfield. This move was undertaken largely for political reasons, i.e. to restore the Presbyterian balance, as against the victorious New Model. Fairfax's army was intended by its founders to be a specifically English army, and Cromwell for one, would have employed it against the Scots, almost as readily as against malignants.

For the moment, however, the advance of the northern army was of the highest military importance, for Fairfax was thereby set free from the necessity of undertaking sieges. Moreover, the publication of the King's papers, taken at Naseby, gave Fairfax's troops a measure of official and popular support, which a month before, they could not have been said to possess. It was now obvious that they represented the armed force of England against the Irish, Danes, French, Lorrainers, etc., whom Charles had for three years been endeavouring to let loose on English soil. Even the Presbyterians abandoned, for the time, any attempt to negotiate with the King, and advocated a vigorous prosecution of the war.

== Fairfax's western campaign ==
This, in the hands of Fairfax and Cromwell, was likely to be effective. While the King and Rupert, with the remnant of their cavalry, hurried into South Wales to join Sir Charles Gerard's troops, and to raise fresh infantry, Fairfax decided that Goring's was the most important Royalist army in the field. He turned to the west, reaching Lechlade on the 26th, less than a fortnight after the battle of Naseby. One last attempt was made to dictate the plan of campaign from Westminster, but the Committee refused to pass on the directions of the Houses, and Fairfax remained free to deal with Goring, as he desired.

Time pressed. Charles in Monmouthshire and Rupert at Bristol were well placed for a junction with Goring, which would have given them a united army, 15,000 strong. Taunton, in spite of Massey's efforts to keep the field, was again besieged. In Wilts and Dorset, numerous bands of Clubmen were on foot, which the King's officers were doing their best to turn into troops for their master. But the process of collecting a fresh royal army was slow, and Goring and his subordinate, Sir Richard Grenville, were alienating the King's most devoted adherents by their rapacity, cruelty and debauchery.

Moreover, Goring had no desire to lose the independent command he had extorted at Stow-on-the-Wold in May. Still, it was clear that he must be disposed of, as quickly as possible. On 26 June, Fairfax requested the Houses to take other measures against the King. This they did by paying up the arrears due to Leven's army, and bringing it to the Severn valley. On 8 July, Leven reached Alcester, bringing with him a Parliamentarian force from Derbyshire, under Sir John Gell. The design was to besiege Hereford.

== Langport ==
By that time, Fairfax and Goring were at close quarters. The Royalist general's line of defence faced west along the River Yeo, and the Parrett, between Yeovil and Bridgwater and thus, barred the direct route to Taunton. Fairfax, however, marched from Lechlade via Marlborough and Blandford, hindered only by Clubmen, the friendly posts of Dorchester and Lyme Regis. With these as his centre of operations, he was able to turn the headwaters of Goring's river-line via Beaminster and Crewkerne.

The Royalists, at once, abandoned the south and west side of the rivers. The siege of Taunton had already been given up, and passed over to the north and east bank. Bridgwater was the right of this second line, as it had been the left of the first; the new left was at Ilchester. Goring could thus remain in touch with Charles in south Wales, through Bristol. The siege of Taunton having been given up, there was no longer any incentive for remaining on the wrong side of the water-line. But Goring's army was thoroughly demoralised by its own licence and indiscipline; and the swift, handy and resolute regiments of the New Model made short work of its strong positions.

On 7 July 1645, demonstrating against the points of passage between Ilchester and Langport, Fairfax secretly occupied Yeovil. The post at that place, which had been the right of Goring's first position, had perhaps rightly been withdrawn to Ilchester, when the second position was taken up. Fairfax repaired the bridge without interruption. Goring showed himself unequal to the new situation. He might, if sober, make a good plan when the enemy was not present to disturb him, and he certainly led cavalry charges with boldness and skill. But of strategy in front of the enemy, he was incapable. On the news from Yeovil, he abandoned the line of the Yeo, as far as Langport, without striking a blow. Fairfax, having nothing to gain by continuing his detour through Yeovil, came back and quietly crossed at Long Sutton, west of Ilchester, on 9 July.

Goring had by now formed a new plan. A strong rearguard was posted at Langport, and on high ground east and north-east of it, to hold Fairfax. He himself, with the cavalry, rode off early on the 8th to try and surprise Taunton. This place was no longer protected by Massey's little army, which Fairfax had called up to assist his own. But Fairfax, who was not yet across Long Sutton bridge, heard of Goring's raid in good time, and sent Massey after him with a body of horse. Massey surprised a large party of the Royalists at Ilminster on the 9th, wounded Goring himself, and pursued the fugitives up to the south-eastern edge of Langport. On the 10th, Fairfax's advanced guard, led by Major Bethel of Cromwell's own regiment, brilliantly stormed the position of Goring's rearguard, east of Langport. The cavalry of the New Model, led by Cromwell himself, swept in pursuit right up to the gates of Bridgwater, where Goring's army, dismayed and on the point of collapse, was more or less rallied.

Thence, Goring himself retired to Barnstaple. His army, under the regimental officers, defended itself in Bridgwater resolutely till 23 July, when it capitulated. The fall of Bridgwater gave Fairfax complete control of Somerset and Dorset, from Lyme Regis to the Bristol channel. Even in the unlikely event of Goring's raising a fresh army, he would now have to break through towards Bristol by open force, and a battle between Goring and Fairfax could only have one result. Thus, Charles had perforce to give up his intention of joining Goring, and of resuming the northern enterprise, begun in the spring. His recruiting operations in south Wales had not been as successful as he had hoped, owing to the apathy of the people, and the vigour of the local Parliamentary leaders.

== Schemes of Lord Digby ==
This time Rupert would not be with him. The prince, now despairing of success and hoping only for a peace on the best terms procurable, listlessly returned to his governorship of Bristol and prepared to meet Fairfax's impending attack. The influence of Rupert was supplanted by that of George Digby, Earl of Bristol. As sanguine as Charles and far more energetic, he was for the rest of the campaign the guiding spirit of the Royalists, but being a civilian he proved incapable of judging the military factors in the situation from a military standpoint, and not only did he offend the officers by constituting himself a sort of confidential military secretary to the King, but he was distrusted by all sections of Royalists for his reckless optimism. The resumption of the northern enterprise, opposed by Rupert and directly inspired by Digby, led to nothing.

Charles marched by Bridgnorth, Lichfield and Ashbourne to Doncaster, where on 18 August he was met by great numbers of Yorkshire gentlemen with promises of fresh recruits. For a moment the outlook was bright, for the Derbyshire men with Gell were far away at Worcester with Leven, the Yorkshire Parliamentarians engaged in besieging Scarborough Castle, Pontefract and other posts. But two days later he heard that David Leslie with the cavalry of Leven's army was coming up behind him, and that, the Yorkshire sieges being now ended, Major-General Poyntz's force lay in his front. It was now impossible to wait for the new levies, and reluctantly the King turned back to Oxford, raiding Huntingdonshire and other parts of the hated Eastern Association en route.

== Fall of Bristol ==
But Charles was in no case to resume his northern march. Fairfax and the New Model, after reducing Bridgwater, had turned back to clear away the Dorsetshire Clubmen and to besiege Sherborne Castle. On the completion of this task, it had been decided to besiege Bristol, and on 23 August 1645 while the King's army was still in Huntingdon, and Goring was trying to raise a new army to replace the one he had lost at Langport and Bridgwater, the city was invested. In these urgent circumstances Charles left Oxford for the west only a day or two after he had come in from the Eastern Association raid. Calculating that Rupert could hold out longest, he first moved to the relief of Worcester.

The success of Montrose's Scottish campaign and his victory at Battle of Kilsyth forced Leslie to lead his cavalry north to bolster the Covenanter militia in Scotland. Without their cavalry to find supplies, Leven's Scottish infantry were more occupied with plundering Worcestershire for food than with the siege works. With his cavalry support on the march to meet Montrose, Leven had no alternative but to withdraw without fighting as the Royalists approached Worcester. Worcester was relieved on 1 September.

King Charles entered Worcester on 8 September, but he found that he could no longer expect recruits from South Wales. Worse was to come. A few hours later, on the night of 9/10 September, Fairfax's army stormed Bristol. Rupert had long realised the hopelessness of further fighting the very summons to surrender sent in by Fairfax placed the fate of Bristol on the political issue, the lines of defence around the place were too extensive for his small force, and on 10 September he surrendered Bristol on terms. He was escorted to Oxford with his men, conversing as he rode with the officers of the escort about peace and the future of his adopted country.

Charles, almost stunned by the suddenness of the catastrophe, dismissed his nephew from all his offices and ordered him to leave England, and for almost the last time called upon Goring to rejoin the main army, if a tiny force of raw infantry and disheartened cavalry can be so called, in the neighbourhood of Raglan. However, before Goring could be brought to withdraw his objections, Charles had again turned northward towards Montrose.

A weary march through the Welsh hills brought the Royal army on 22 September to the neighbourhood of Chester. Charles himself with one body entered the city, which was partially invested by the Parliamentarian colonel Michael Jones, and the rest under Sir Marmaduke Langdale was sent to take Jones's lines in reverse. But at the opportune moment Poyntz's forces, which had followed the King's movements since he left Doncaster in the middle of August, appeared in rear of Langdale, and defeated him in the battle of Rowton Heath (September 24), while at the same time a sortie of the King's troops from Chester was repulsed by Jones. Thereupon the Royal army withdrew to Denbigh, and Chester, the only important seaport remaining to connect Charles with Ireland, was again besieged.

== Digby's northern expedition ==
Charles received the news of Philiphaugh on 28 September 1645, and gave orders that the west should be abandoned, the prince of Wales should be sent to France, and Goring should bring up what forces he could to the Oxford region. On 4 October Charles himself reached Newark (whither he had marched from Denbigh after revictualling Chester and suffering the defeat of Rowton Heath). The intention to go to Montrose was of course given up, at any rate for the present, and he was merely waiting for Goring and the Royalist militia of the west each in its own way a broken reed to lean upon. A hollow reconciliation was patched up between Charles and Rupert, and the court remained at Newark for over a month. Before it set out to return to Oxford another Royalist force had been destroyed.

On 14 October, receiving information that Montrose had raised a new army, the King permitted Langdale's northern troops to make a fresh attempt to reach Scotland. At Langdale's request Digby was appointed to command in this enterprise, and, civilian though he was, and disastrous though his influence had been to the discipline of the army, he led it boldly and skillfully. His immediate opponent was Poyntz, who had followed the King step by step from Doncaster to Chester and back to Welbeck, and he succeeded on the 15th in surprising Poyntz's entire force of foot at Sherburn. Poyntz's cavalry were soon after this reported approaching from the south, and Digby hoped to trap them also.

At first all went well and body after body of the rebels was routed. But by a singular mischance the Royalist main body mistook the Parliamentary squadrons in flight through Sherburn for friends, and believing all was lost took to flight also. Thus Digby's cavalry fled as fast as Poyntz's and in the same direction, and the latter, coming to their senses first, drove the Royalist horse in wild confusion as far as Skipton. Lord Digby was still sanguine, and from Skipton he actually penetrated as far as Dumfries. But whether Montrose's new army was or was not in the Lowlands, it was certain that Leven and Leslie were on the Border, and the mad adventure soon came to an end. Digby, with the mere handful of men remaining to him, was driven back into Cumberland, and on 24 October, his army having entirely disappeared, he took ship with his officers for the Isle of Man. Poyntz had not followed him beyond Skipton, and was now watching the King from Nottingham, while Rossiter with the Lincoln troops was posted at Grantham.

The King's chances of escaping from Newark were becoming smaller day by day, and they were not improved by a violent dispute between him and Rupert, Maurice, Lord Gerard and Sir Richard Willis, at the end of which these officers and many others rode away to ask Parliament for leave to go over-seas. The pretext of the quarrel mattered little, the distinction between the views of Charles and Digby on the one hand and Rupert and his friends on the other was fundamental to the latter peace had become a political as well as a military necessity. Meanwhile, south Wales, with the single exception of Raglan Castle, had been overrun by Parliamentarians. Everywhere the Royalist posts were falling. The New Model, no longer fearing Goring, had divided, Fairfax reducing the garrisons of Dorset and Devon, Cromwell those of Hampshire. Amongst the latter was the famous Basing House, which was stormed at dawn on 14 October and burnt to the ground. Cromwell, his work finished, returned to headquarters, and the army wintered in the neighbourhood of Crediton.

== Notes ==
← 1644	First English Civil War	1646 →
