= Treaty of Oxford =

1643 peace proposal between the Long Parliament and King Charles I in England

The Treaty of Oxford of 1643 was an unsuccessful attempt by the Long Parliament and King Charles I to negotiate a peace treaty.

On 28 January 1643, Charles, at the request of both houses, granted a safe-conduct for the earls of Northumberland, Pembroke, Salisbury and Holland, and five commoners (Sir John Holland, Sir William Litton, William Pierrepoint, Bulstrode Whitlock, Edmund Waller, Richard Winwood), carrying with them propositions from Parliament. The Earl of Northumberland read out Parliament’s propositions and Charles replied with his conditions. After this initial meeting nothing more was done until March.

The demands of Parliament were the same in effect as the Nineteen Propositions they had put to him in York in June 1642 and Charles had never been less disposed to submit his claims to a compromise. In a letter to marquis Hamilton, 2 December 1642 "I have set up my rest upon the goodness of my cause, being resolved that no extremity or misfortune shall make me yield; for I will be either a glorious king or a patient martyr." Since then the fortunes of the Cavalier party had risen with a number of partial successes.

The perceived strength of the parliamentary position by the parliamentary commissioners been somewhat undermined by the interception of a letter from Lord Goring which gave a highly encouraging view of Cavalier progress. It boasted of large supplies of money from Frederick Henry, Prince of Orange and from France; of cannon, and arms for horse and foot, part of them sent by the King Christian IV of Denmark, some of which were already shipped for Newcastle, and the rest on the point of being embarked with the English queen Henrietta Maria. Three regiments of his majesty's subjects then serving in France,— Irish probably and Catholics,— were announced as ready to come if required, and confident expectations were expressed that the royal army would be enabled to support itself by subsidies forcibly raised upon the people throughout the kingdom; which, it was added, "are all encouragements to make us expect no treaties to be admitted, but upon terms of great honor and advantage to his majesty."

Charles's parting promise to the queen to come to no agreement unknown to her, was likewise constantly present to the memory of Charles. Various considerations however impelled him to encourage a renewal of the treaty; of which perhaps the principal was, the necessity of satisfying the importunities of those men of rank, fortune and character amongst his own adherents, whose deep stake in the country rendered them incessantly urgent for the restoration of tranquillity, and to whom he could not with safety avow his real sentiments and designs. The details supplied by Edward Hyde, 1st Earl of Clarendon in his Life of himself leave no possibility of doubting the utter insincerity of the king throughout the negotiations.

Between the first overtures in January and the further proceedings in March, the queen had landed from Holland, and the parliament had intercepted a letter written by her to the king immediately on her disembarkation, in which she expressed her apprehensions of a bad peace, and declared that she would never live in England if she might not have a guard for her person; and it was plain that the king had purposely protracted the business in expectation of her arrival.

The parliamentary commissioners on their second appearance at Oxford were reduced, by the king's refusal to receive lord Say, to five;—the Earl of Northumberland and four commoners. They were tied up so strictly by their instructions as to have no power to alter even a word in the articles, and only twenty days were allowed them; six to arrange a cessation of arms, and the rest to conclude the treaty. To the cessation the king, by the admission of Clarendon, was totally averse, thinking that if once he agreed to it, he should be unable to avoid consenting to the peace; and he therefor, by a kind of fraud upon his own official advisers, secretly directed "the gentlemen of different counties attending the court" to present him with an address against it. Hyde and other advisers who might have helped Charles negotiate a treaty where thus unable to do so.

The counter-statements of the parliament accuse the king of granting and then violating the armistice. The commissioners, however, proceeded to the treaty itself; and to smooth difficulties, Mr. Pierpoint, one of the number, secretly made a proposal, that the king should gain the earl of Northumberland favour, by a promise of restoring him after a peace to the office of lord admiral; but Charles professed himself too deeply offended at what he thought the ingratitude of that nobleman to consent. Meantime he continued to trifle the time with a show of irresolution.

The parliamentary commissioners were under strict instructions from Parliament to negotiate only with Charles directly. However he proved to be difficult to negotiate with as he frequently changed his mind between meetings with the parliamentary commissioners. Some subscribed these changes of mind to Charles being swayed by the different factions in court, others put it down to his own duplicity.

Tired at length of unprofitable discussions, Charles sent a final message to the Long Parliament, proposing that if they would restore all their expelled members, and adjourn their meetings to some place twenty miles from London, he would then consent to disband his armies and return speedily to his parliament, according to their demand. The two houses on receipt of a proposal which could scarcely be regarded as serious, ordered their commissioners to return without delay, which they did on 15 April, leaving the hopes of peace colder than ever.
