= Siege of Arundel =

Siege of Arundel (1643)
- Part of First English Civil War
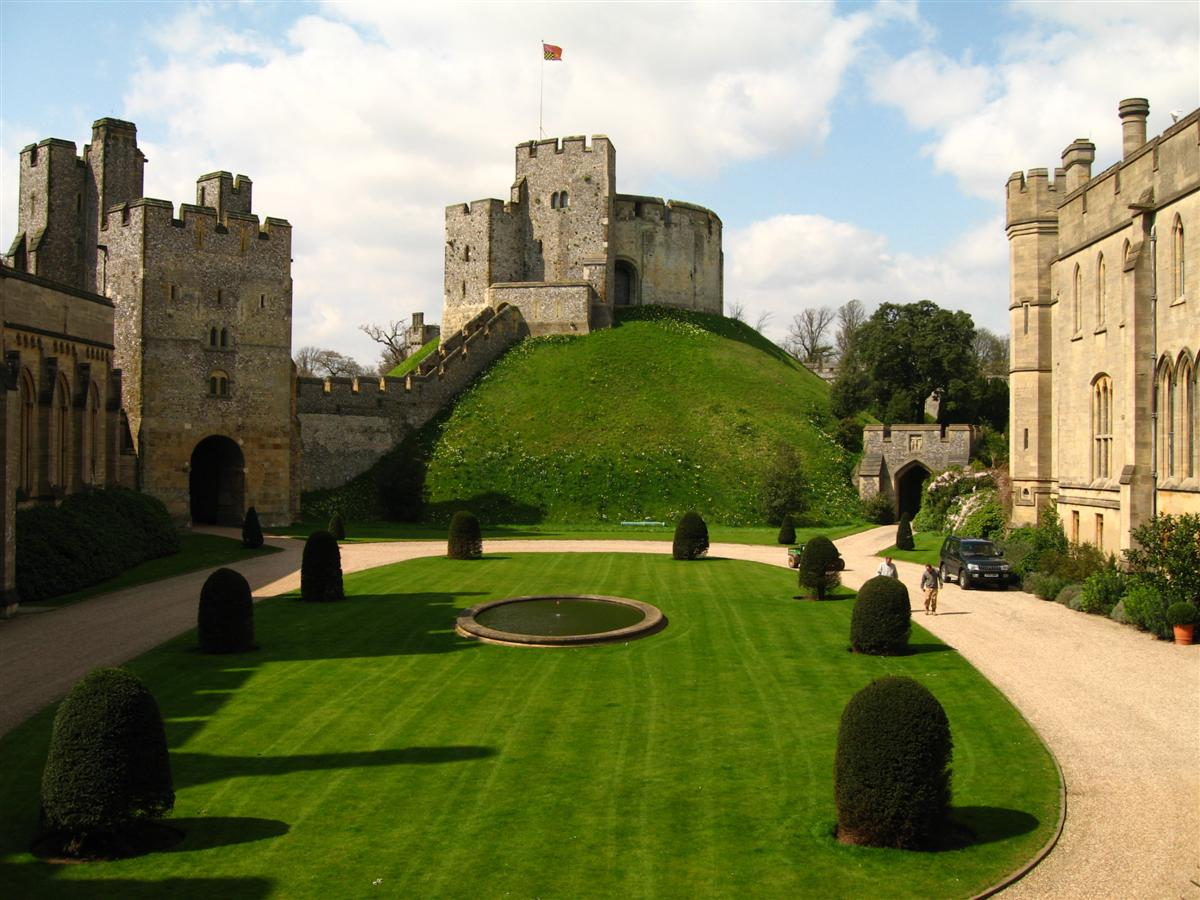
- Arundel Castle, 2006; the Norman keep (shown here) is the only survivor from 1643, the rest 19th century
Date	19 December 1643 – 6 January 1644
Location	Arundel, West Sussex
Result	Parliamentarian victory

Belligerents
Royalists	(Kingdom of England) Parliamentarians

Commanders and leaders
Joseph Bampfield (surrendered); Sir Edward Ford (surrendered)	Sir William Waller; John Birch (WIA)

Strength
800 (Note: Waller reported taking '1,000 prisoners', which included civilians suspected of being Royalist sympathisers)	5,000

Casualties and losses
Unknown	Unknown

The siege of Arundel took place during the First English Civil War, from 19 December 1643 to 6 January 1644, when a Royalist garrison surrendered to a Parliamentarian army under Sir William Waller.

At the end of 1642, South-East England was largely controlled by Parliament, with pockets of Royalist support in Hampshire and Kent. In an October 1643 offensive led by Sir Ralph Hopton, the Royalists advanced into Sussex, where a small garrison at Arundel Castle surrendered without fighting on 2 December. (Note: Sometimes given as 9 December, but this seems more likely, since Waller was advised of its surrender on 5 December)

Hopton's policy of trying to hold as many towns as possible left individual garrisons isolated, while the Royalists lacked a mobile field army, capable of quickly supporting threatened positions. Arundel was attacked by a large Parliamentarian force on 19 December; although strongly held, severe weather and poor roads meant it could not be relieved, and surrendered on 6 January.

== Background ==
When the First English Civil War began in August 1642, Parliamentarian forces secured most of southern England, including the ports of Southampton and Dover, as well as the bulk of the Royal Navy. After Portsmouth surrendered in September, Parliament controlled every major port from Plymouth to Hull, preventing the Royalists from importing arms and men from Europe. This situation changed on 13 July 1643 when Sir Ralph Hopton, Royalist commander in the south-west, inflicted a serious defeat on Sir William Waller at the Battle of Roundway Down outside Devizes.

Parliamentarian garrisons in the west were left isolated, enabling Prince Rupert to storm Bristol on 26 July. Capturing the second largest city in Britain was a significant achievement, and allowed the Royalists to transfer troops from Ireland. With South West England secured, it also provided an opportunity to threaten London and persuade moderates like Denzil Holles to negotiate peace. At a strategy meeting in Oxford, it was agreed Prince Rupert would take Gloucester, the last major Parliamentarian position in the west, then march on the capital. Hopton would support him by advancing into Hampshire and Sussex, whose Wealden iron industry was Parliament's main source of armaments.

Southern England; key locations 1643

However, Hopton was short of money and supplies, while his infantry consisted mostly of half-trained Irish conscripts, which delayed him until mid-October. By then, Prince Rupert had failed at Gloucester, and his advance on London was checked at the inconclusive battle of First Newbury on 20 September. This would prove the highpoint of Royalist success and by the time Hopton was ready to move their chances of military victory had passed.

One of his officers was Sir William Ogle, who had been serving in Ireland, but came from Winchester. In late October, he discovered the Parliamentarian garrison had been withdrawn and occupied the town, forcing Hopton to advance before he was ready. On reaching Winchester in early November, his troops promptly mutinied and a number were executed before order was restored.

Meanwhile, Waller had assembled a new army at Farnham Castle, consisting of Trained Bands from the South-Eastern Association of Kent, Sussex and Hampshire, bolstered by others from London. Throughout the war, both sides relied on these militia, whose service was normally limited to 30 days, within their home area. As the largest and best equipped, London units were often used to fill gaps and Waller's army included several regiments originally mustered in early September. After an attack on Basing House in November failed, these now demanded they be sent home.

Hopton marched on Farnham, but was unable to tempt Waller into giving battle, and retreated. The Royalists established winter quarters at various points in West Sussex and Hampshire, including Alresford, Alton and Petersfield, although senior officers warned they were too far apart for mutual support. On 2 December, a small Parliamentarian garrison at Arundel Castle surrendered to Edward Ford, former Sheriff of Sussex, after 36 men blew in the gate with a petard.

== The siege ==
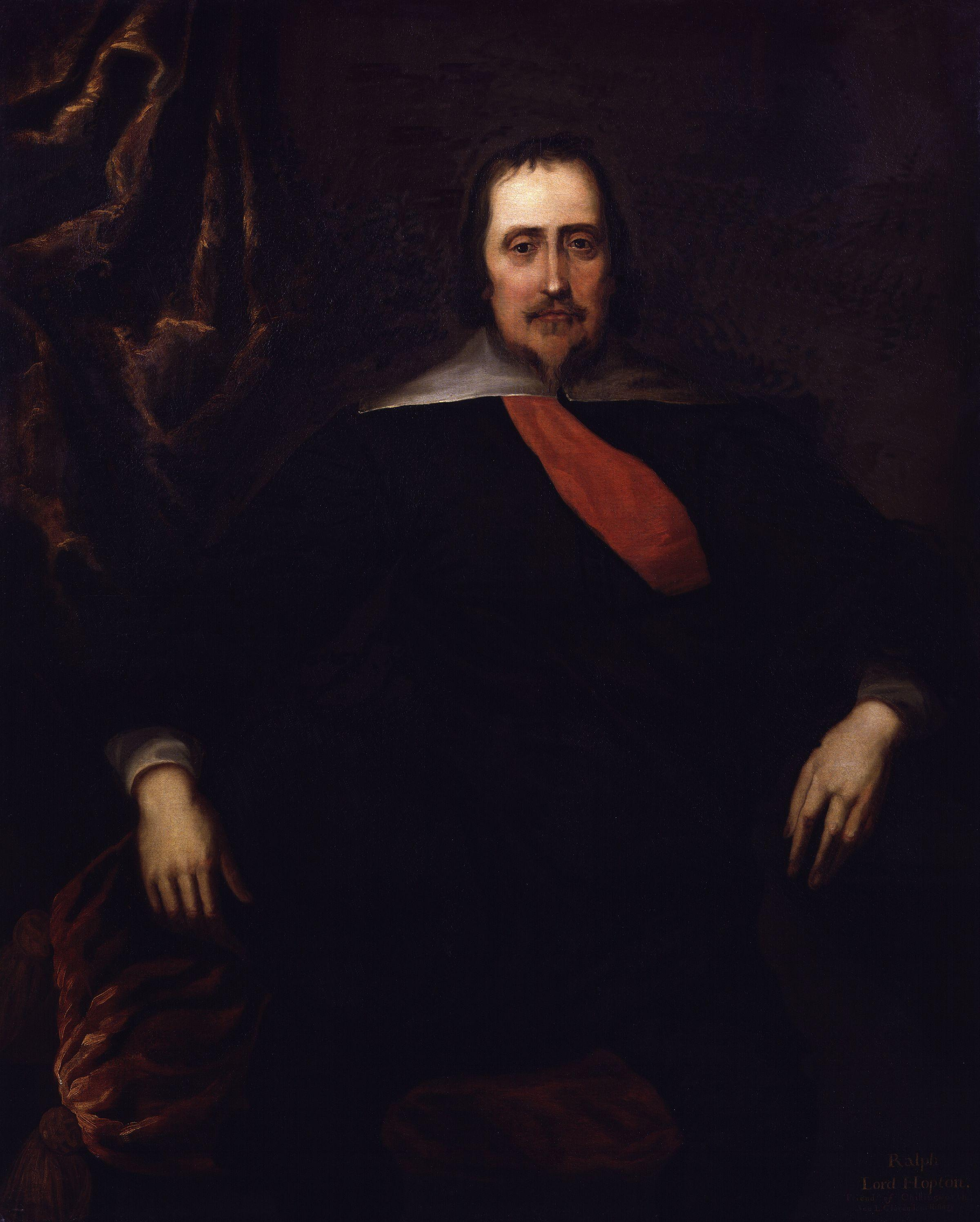
Ralph Hopton, Royalist commander in the south

Instructed by the Earl of Essex to retake Alton, then Arundel, Waller persuaded the London Bands to help him capture Alton on 13 December. When he asked for their help with Arundel, they refused, and were dismissed on 15 December. The Royalist garrison originally contained 800 infantry, and four troops of horse, withdrawn by Hopton prior to the siege. The governor, Colonel Joseph Bampfield, was an experienced soldier, who constructed additional earthwork defences to the north and south-west of the town, while bringing in provisions from the surrounding countryside. An attack on Bramber further to the east was repulsed by Sir Michael Livesey, and when Hopton learned of the loss of Alton, he immediately ordered him back to Arundel.

Despite being six miles inland, Arundel was an important inland port and the only Royalist position strong enough to resist attack. Waller arrived on 19 December, with around 5,000 men from the South-Eastern trained bands, most of whom were of limited quality. He immediately assaulted the outer defences on 20 December, which were captured after an initial repulse; Lt-Colonel John Birch was shot in the stomach, allegedly surviving only because the cold weather stemmed the flow of blood.

The garrison retreated into the castle, but lost their supplies, which had been stored in the town, while the besiegers drained the lake that was their main water supply. Oxford sent Hopton an additional 1,000 horse under Lord Wilmot, but he was now desperately short of infantry, having lost another 600 at Alton. On 27 December, he advanced from Winchester with 2,000 horse, and 1,500 infantry; leaving a skeleton force to continue the siege, Waller intercepted him at North Marden, 15 miles from Arundel. Outnumbered, Hopton withdrew, allowing Waller to bring up heavy guns from Portsmouth, which opened fire on 4 January. Weakened by typhus, and short of supplies, the Royalists surrendered on 6th; about 100 re-enlisted in the Parliamentary army, the rest sent to London. (Note: On Thursday the Enemy sent a Drummer to me, with a Letter, signifying their Willingness to surrender the Castle, if they might have Honourable Conditions: I returned Answer, That when I first possessed myself of the Town, I summoned them in the Castle to yield upon fair Quarter; but they were pleased to refuse either to give or take Quarter: I now took them at their Word, and bid them yield to Mercy. That Night I heard no more of them; but the next Morning the Drummer came to me again with another Letter, wherein they disavowed that Answer to my Trumpet, laying the Fault upon One (who they said had no more Soldiery than Civility) that without their Assent or Knowledge had given that Language. I sent them Answer, That I was very much satisfied, that, in this Disavowing that Harshness, they had made room for Courtesy; and that I was contented to give them fair Quarter; and that, according to their Desire formerly expressed, if they would send out to me Three Officers of Quality, I would employ Three of equal Condition to them, to treat with them about the Particulars of the Surrender: Within a short Time after, there came out unto me Colonel Bamfeild, Major Bovill, and Captain Hodgido, who pressed very much that they might have Liberty to march away like Soldiers, otherwise they should chuse Death rather than Life; and so broke off: About Two Hours after, they sent out to me Lieutenant Colonel Rawlins and Major Moulin, who, after some Debate, came to Agreement with me, that this Morning they would deliver the Castle into my Hands, by Ten of the Clock, with Colours, Arms, &c. undefaced and unspoiled; and that the Gentlemen and Officers should have fair Quarter and civil Usage, the ordinary Soldiers Quarter: For Performance of Covenants, Sir Edward Ford and Sir Edward Bishopp were immediately to be yielded to me; which was accordingly done. This Morning we entered; and are now, blessed be God, in Possession of the Place. We have taken Seventeen Colours of Foot, and Two of Horse; we have taken One Thousand Prisoners one with another, besides One Hundred and Sixty which we took at the first entering of the Town, and such as came from the Enemy to us during the Siege. I humbly desire the London Regiments may be speedily sent hither, to secure this important Place, whilst I advance with that Strength I have towards the Enemy, who lies still at Havant. I humbly rest, “Your Excellency's Most humble Servant, Wm. Waller.” Arundell, 6 Januarii, 1643/4.)

Colonel Sir William Springett (Note: Also spelt 'Springate' in some contemporary sources) was appointed commander of the Parliamentarian garrison but died of fever on 3 February and was succeeded by Captain William Morley. Bampfield later wrote an account of the siege, in which he claimed sickness and casualties had reduced the garrison to less than 200 effectives. This account was corroborated by Waller who attested to his stubborn defence, but Hopton blamed him for the defeat and it was his version that appeared in Clarendon's "History of the Rebellion". He was held prisoner for six months, before being exchanged for two Parliamentarian officers held in Oxford.

== Aftermath ==
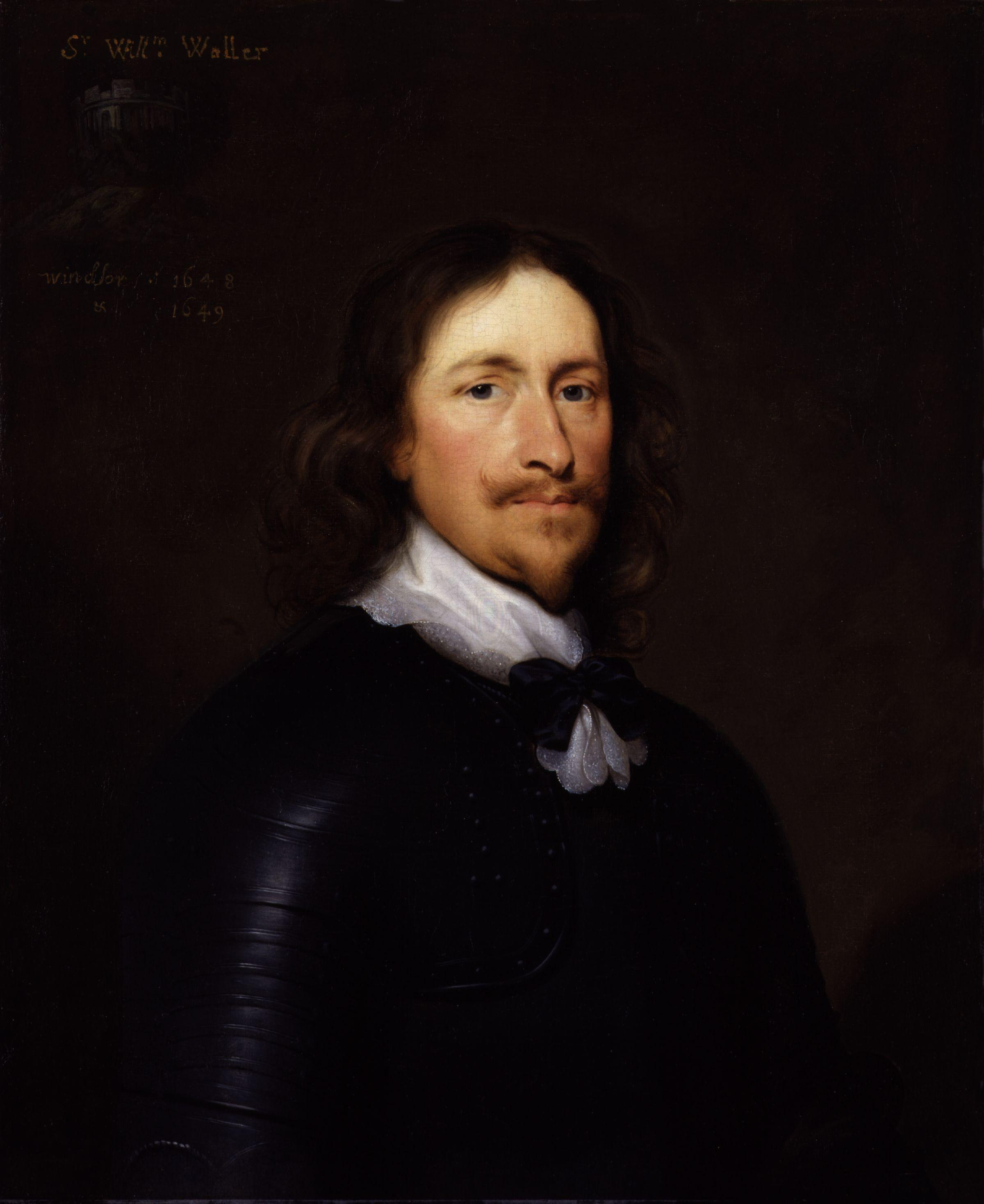
Sir William Waller, commander of the South-Eastern Association

Following the loss of Arundel, Charles I ordered Hopton to withdraw into Wiltshire to ensure he remained in contact with Bristol. However, he was able to persuade Charles that he should remain in Hampshire and prevent Waller's cavalry raiding Royalist areas in the west. On 12 January 1644, Waller advised Essex he was fortifying and re-provisioning Arundel, before a heavy snow fall ended operations for the next few weeks.

By the end of February, Waller's army had been increased to over 8,000

and he was ordered to slip past Hopton and retake the west. Although one of his commanders, Sir Richard Grenville, deserted to Hopton in early March with this information, Waller defeated him at the Battle of Cheriton on 29 March. Ogle retained Winchester until October 1645 but this ended any significant Royalist threat to the south-east.

Waller installed a permanent garrison, and the castle was used to store military supplies and hold prisoners. In May 1645, Captain Morley was appointed governor, a position he retained until 1653, when 'the walls and works' of the castle were demolished, or 'slighted'. This was part of a wider programme to reduce the size of the New Model Army by limiting the number of garrisons required.

A detailed description of the impact of the siege on Arundel was provided by the wife of Sir William Springett, Lady Mary, who describes it as 'depopulated, all the windows broke with the guns, and the soldiers making stables of all the shops and lower rooms.' Her daughter Guielma was born a few days after her father's death and later married William Penn. This anecdote was used by author Hester Burton in her 1969 novel Thomas.

== Sources ==
- Baggs, A.P; Warne, H.R (1977). T.P, Hudson (ed.). Arundel in A History of the County of Sussex Volume 5, Part 1; Arundel Rape (1997 ed.). Victoria County History. ISBN 978-0197227817.
- Bampfield, Joseph (1685). Colonel Joseph Bamfield's Apologie written by himself and printed at his desire.
- BCW. "John Birch". BCW Project.
- Carlton, Charles (1992). Going to the Wars: The Experience of the British Civil Wars 1638-1651. Routledge. ISBN 978-0415032827.
- Day, Jon (2007). Gloucester & Newbury 1643: The Turning Point of the Civil War. Pen & Sword Military. ISBN 978-1844155910.
- Donagan, Barbara (2008). "Ford, Sir Edward". Oxford Dictionary of National Biography (online ed.). Oxford University Press. doi:10.1093/ref:odnb/9855. (Subscription, Wikipedia Library access or UK public library membership required.)
- Hardacre, Paul; Loftis, John (1993). Bampfield's Later Career; a biographical companion. Bucknell Publishing.
- Hodgkin, Lucy (1947). Gulielma: Wife of William Penn. Longmans Green.
- Johnson, David (2012). Parliament in crisis; the disintegration of the Parliamentarian war effort during the summer of 1643 (PDF) (PHD). York University.
- Nagel, Lawson Chase (1982). The militia of London, 1641-1649. University of London.
- Royle, Trevor (2004). Civil War: The War of the Three Kingdoms 1638-1660. Brown, Little. ISBN 978-0316861250.
- Wanklyn, Frank; Jones, Robert (2005). A Military History of the English Civil War: 1642-1649. Pearson Longman. ISBN 978-0582772816.
- Wedgwood, CV (1958). The King's War, 1641-1647 (2001 ed.). Penguin Classics. ISBN 978-0141390727.
