= Joseph Bampfield =

English soldier and spy

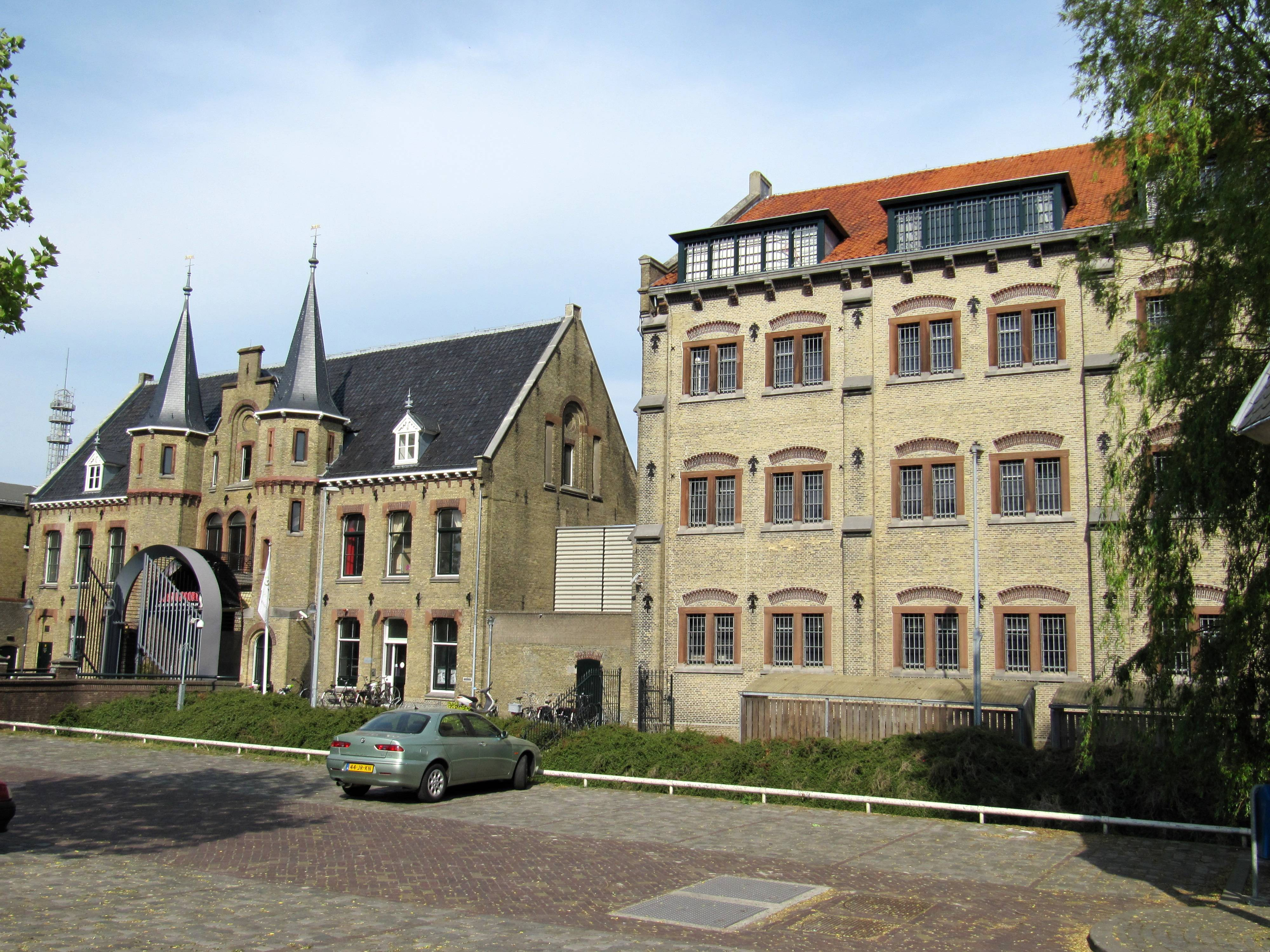
- Leeuwarden, where Bampfield died in 1685
- Born: 1622; Devon
- Died: 1685 (aged 62–63); Leeuwarden
- Relatives: Catherine Sydenham (wife, 1643-1657); Anne Halkett (partner, 1648-1653)
- Military career
- Rank: Colonel
- Conflicts: Wars of the Three Kingdoms; Yeovil; Sieges of Exeter, Dartmouth, Devon, Bramber Bridge, Arundel; Siege of Lyme Regis; Lostwithiel; Second Newbury; First Siege of Taunton; Second Anglo-Dutch War; Franco-Dutch War; Siege of Ameide

Joseph Bampfield (1622–1685) was an English soldier and spy, who served with the Royalist army in the Wars of the Three Kingdoms, then became an intelligence agent for The Protectorate. Banished from England after the 1660 Stuart Restoration, he moved to the Dutch Republic and joined the Dutch States Army when the Second Anglo-Dutch War began in 1665. As a result he was convicted of treason by Parliament and never returned home.

Bampfield was generally viewed as a competent soldier; even his critics agreed he was a 'man of wit and parts', who displayed energy and resourcefulness, included arranging the escape of James, Duke of York from his Parliamentarian guards in 1648. He clearly possessed the ability to impress his superiors, successively acting as a trusted messenger between Charles I of England and the Scots, an agent for Oliver Cromwell and expert advisor to Dutch Grand Pensionary Johan de Witt.

However, he seems to have lacked tact or political awareness, qualities which made him powerful enemies, in particular Charles II who never forgave him for suggesting he had not done enough to save his father from execution in 1649. This led to his dismissal from Royalist service in 1654 and exile in 1661 but how far his reputation for being untrustworthy was deserved is disputed.

Dismissed from the Dutch army by William of Orange in 1673, he retired to Leeuwarden where he died in 1685.

== Personal details ==
Joseph Bampfield was born in 1622; his parentage is obscure and details are lacking but he is generally assumed to come from Devon, despite later claims by Clarendon he was Irish. Although the relationship cannot be traced with certainty, the Bampfields were a prominent Devon family and devout Presbyterians, as was Bampfield himself.

He married Catherine Sydenham (died 1657) in 1643; they separated in 1646, but remained legally married until her death. From 1648 to 1653 he was in a relationship with Anne Halkett (1623–1699), who helped him arrange the escape of the Duke of York from his Parliamentarian guards in 1648.

== Royalist soldier and agent; 1639 to 1654 ==
The primary sources for Bampfield's career in this period include Clarendon's History of the Rebellion and his 1685 autobiography Colonel Joseph Bampfield's apology; written as a "justification", parts of it should be treated with care. Although Clarendon admitted he was "a man of wit and parts", Bampfield belonged to the "Presbyterian" faction, those willing to make concessions over the Church of England to win the backing of English Presbyterians and Covenanters. Himself a devout Anglican, Clarendon loathed Bampfield and others like him who supported this view, including Queen Henrietta Maria of France, and argued their action would destroy the cause for which they were fighting.

Such caveats aside, the facts of his career can generally be independently verified. In the first of the two Bishops' Wars in 1639, he served as an ensign in a regiment commanded by Jacob Astley, then as Lieutenant under Colonel Henry Wentworth in 1640. When the First English Civil War began in August 1642, Bampfield was appointed major in a regiment raised by the Marquis of Hertford, Royalist commander in South West England. He was captured on 7 September in the Battle of Babylon Hill outside Yeovil, one of the first encounters of the war. Taken to London, in December he escaped to the Royalist war-time capital in Oxford, where he was promoted colonel and given command of an infantry regiment.

Bampfield's war, 1642 to 1645; key locations

Hertford recognised his service by including him in a group of officers created M.A. of Oxford University, after which Bampfield returned to South West England where he helped capture Malmesbury, Exeter and Dartmouth. In October, he accompanied Sir Ralph Hopton's advance into Sussex and was given command of Arundel Castle, before being forced to surrender it in January 1644 and made prisoner again.

Although the Parliamentarian commander Sir William Waller attested to his stubborn defence, Hopton blamed Bampfield for the defeat and it was this version of events that later appeared in Clarendon's "History of the Rebellion". He was exchanged in June 1644 and served with Prince Maurice in the campaign that began with the Siege of Lyme Regis, then culminated in Lostwithiel and Second Newbury. Hopton dismissed him after the failed First Siege of Taunton in November, and Bampfield spent the rest of the war in Oxford, where he became a confidential servant to Charles I.

After surrendering in May 1646, Charles spent the next two years seeking to regain by negotiation what he failed to achieve by force. Bampfield acted as his agent in discussions with English and Scottish Presbyterians, the basis of the Royalist coalition during the 1648 Second English Civil War. Just before it began in April, Bampfield arranged the escape of Charles' second son James, Duke of York, who was being held in St. James's Palace. He was assisted in this by Anne Halkett, who helped James disguise himself as a woman and escape to the Dutch Republic; the revolt was suppressed and Charles executed in January 1649, leading to the establishment of the Commonwealth of England. Bampfield's claim his sons had not done enough to save their father was never forgiven by Charles II and he was dismissed from the exiled court.

He spent the next six months hiding in London with Anne, whom he apparently married before leaving the Netherlands, after being been told his first wife had died. This later proved untrue, although whether Bampfield was aware of this is unclear. Arrested in December 1649, he soon escaped but on the ship to The Hague met Anne's brother-in-law Sir Henry Newton, who challenged him to a duel for allegedly seducing her. Newton was badly wounded and Bampfield fled to Scotland, where the Covenanters had crowned Charles and were preparing the attempt to regain his English throne which ended at Worcester in August 1651.

Bampfield was part of the "Presbyterian interest" headed by Lord Balcarres, whose feud with Glencairn was viewed as contributing to the failure of the 1653 rising. Supported by Charles, whose experiences in Scotland left him extremely hostile towards the Covenanters, his chief advisor Clarendon excluded the "Presbyterians" from involvement in their affairs. With the two most powerful figures in the exiled court his personal opponents, Bampfield moved to Paris and began providing intelligence on Royalist plots to John Thurloe, chief spymaster for the Protectorate. This entailed frequent visits to England, until March 1657 when Oliver Cromwell became suspicious he was still a Royalist and barred him from returning.

== Dutch service; 1660 to 1685 ==
Bampfield returned to England just before the Stuart Restoration in May 1660, hoping for inclusion in the general pardon issued by Charles. Sir Richard Willis, a senior member of the Sealed Knot who had also been recruited by Thurloe as a double agent, went unpunished while Clarendon employed Thurloe as an unofficial advisor. Bampfield however was imprisoned in the Tower of London until July 1661, when he was released and moved to Middelburg, Zeeland, a centre of English radicals. As suggested by Sir Allen Apsley, he reported on their activities for the government but does not appear to have been paid for doing so.

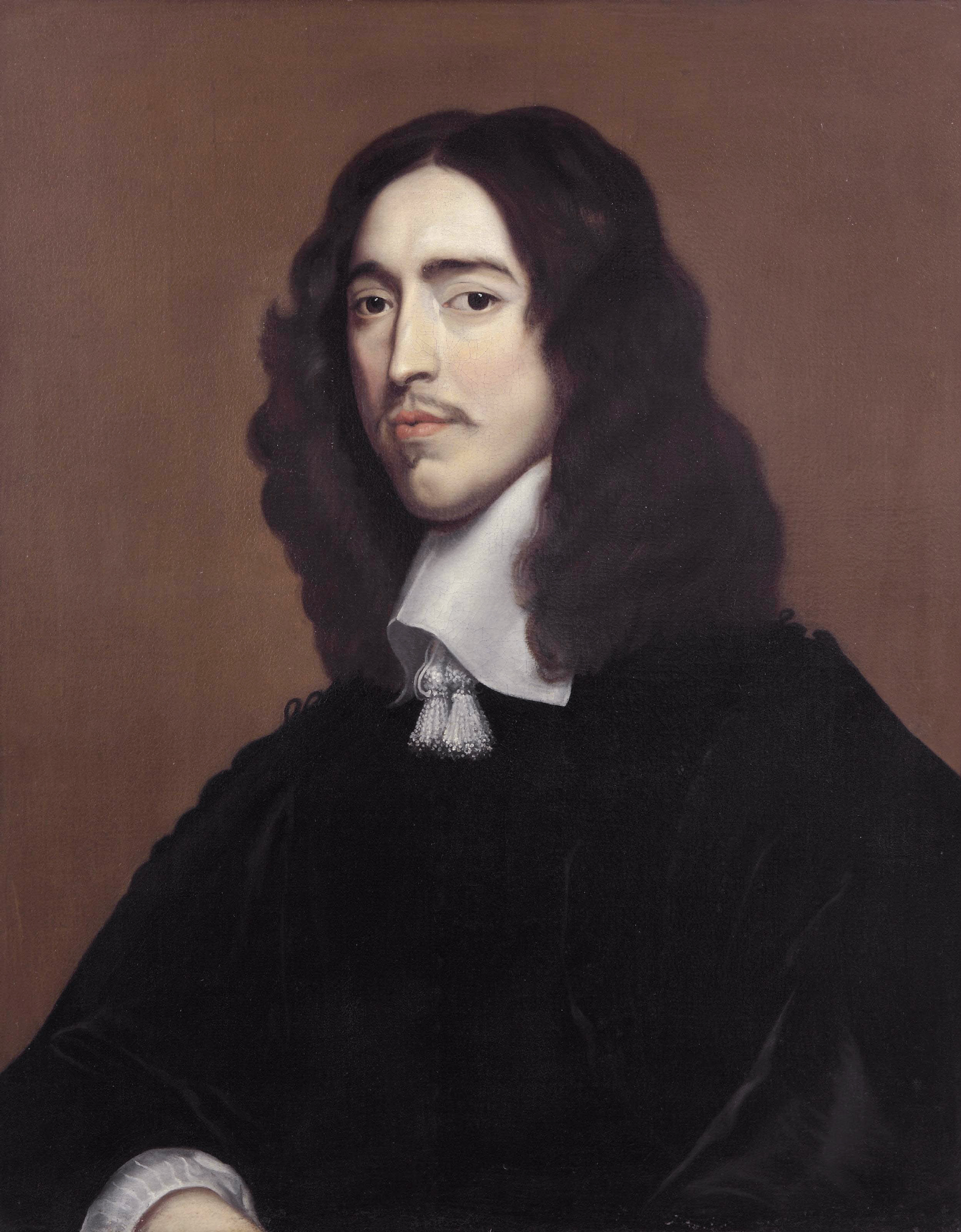
Dutch Grand Pensionary Johan de Witt who employed Bampfield as an expert on the English court

In 1664, Dutch Grand Pensionary Johan de Witt employed him as an expert on the English court; when the Second Anglo-Dutch War began in 1665, he joined the Dutch States Army and along with two others was convicted of treason. His actions were not unusual for the period and why he was singled out unclear; most 17th century armies were multinational, while the Scots Brigade continued in Dutch service throughout. As it was a maritime conflict, he did not fight his countrymen, unlike many English sailors who joined the Dutch navy where conditions and pay were substantially better. After the Raid on the Medway in 1667, diarist Samuel Pepys recorded reports of English voices shouting insults from the Dutch ships.

He continued to advise de Witt, was appointed colonel in March 1671 and when the Franco-Dutch War began in May 1672 was based near Zwolle, a key position on the IJssel Line. The Dutch were poorly prepared and major positions like Schenkenschanz fell without resistance; still remembered as the Rampjaar, or "Year of disaster", it initially seemed the French had achieved a stunning victory. Bampfield could not persuade the Zwolle militia to defend their town and shortly afterwards his garrison at Ameide was over-run. William of Orange managed to stabilise the position by the end of July but Bampfield was one of dozens of officers court-martialled in the recriminations that followed, while de Witt was lynched.

Although twice acquitted and restored to his rank, this ended Bampfield's career; it is suggested factors included his association with de Witt and the enmity of Charles II, William's uncle. He retired to Leeuwarden where he died in 1685.

== Sources ==
- Act for attainting Joseph Bampfield (1819). Charles II, 1665: An Act for attainting Thomas Dolman Joseph Bampfield and Thomas Scott of High-Treason if they render not themselves by a day in Statutes of the Realm: Volume 5, 1628-80. Great Britain Record Commission.
- BCW. "Colonel Joseph Bampfield's Regiment of Foot". BCW Project. Archived from the original on 7 May 2015.
- Hardacre, Paul; Loftis, John (1993). Bampfield's Later Career; a biographical companion. Bucknell Publishing.
- Lynn, John (1999). The Wars of Louis XIV, 1667–1714 (Modern Wars in Perspective). Longman. ISBN 978-0582056299.
- Ottway, Sheila; Dragstra, Henk; Wilcox, Helen (2000). Betraying Our Selves: Forms of Self-representation in Early Modern English Text. Palgrave Macmillan. ISBN 978-0333740293.
- Marshall, Alan (2004). "Bampfield, Joseph (1622-1685)". Oxford Dictionary of National Biography (online ed.). Oxford University Press. doi:10.1093/ref:odnb/1259. (Subscription, Wikipedia Library access or UK public library membership required.)
- Royle, Trevor (2004). Civil War: The Wars of the Three Kingdoms 1638–1660 (2006 ed.). Abacus. ISBN 978-0-349-11564-1.
- Seaward, Paul, ed. (2009). Introduction to Edward Hyde, Earl of Clarendon: The History of the Rebellion; A New Selection. Oxford University Press.
- Stevenson, David (2004). "Halkett [née Murray], Anne [Anna], Lady Halkett (1623-1699)". Oxford Dictionary of National Biography (online ed.). Oxford University Press. doi:10.1093/ref:odnb/11934. (Subscription, Wikipedia Library access or UK public library membership required.)
- Tomalin, Claire (2002). Samuel Pepys; the unequalled self (2012 ed.). Penguin. ISBN 978-0241963265.
