= Battle of Alton =

1643 battle in the First English Civil War

Coordinates: 51°9′4″N 0°58′33″W

- Part of First English Civil War
Date	13 December 1643
Location	Alton, Hampshire
Result	Parliamentary victory

Belligerents
Royalists	Parliamentarians

Commanders and leaders
Sir Ralph Hopton; Colonel Richard Boles †	Sir William Waller

Strength
~1,000: 300–500 horse 600+ infantry	5,000: Westminster Trained Bands (the Red Regiment); Green Auxiliary Trained Bands of London; Tower Hamlets Auxiliary Trained Bands (the Yellow Regiment); A foot regiment (Waller's own); Horse that had survived Roundway Down

Casualties and losses
100+ 500+ captured	~10

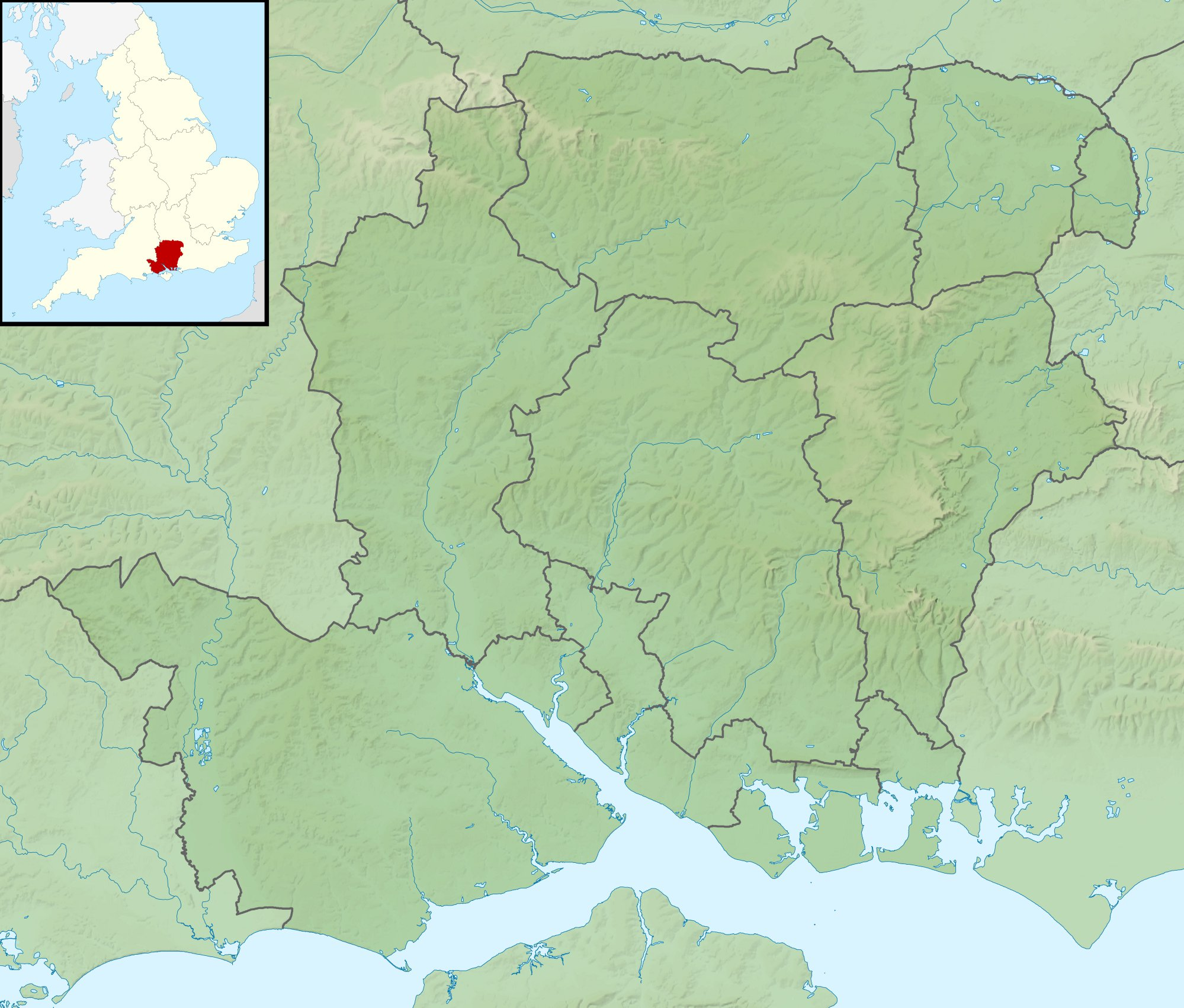
Hampshire County and Alton

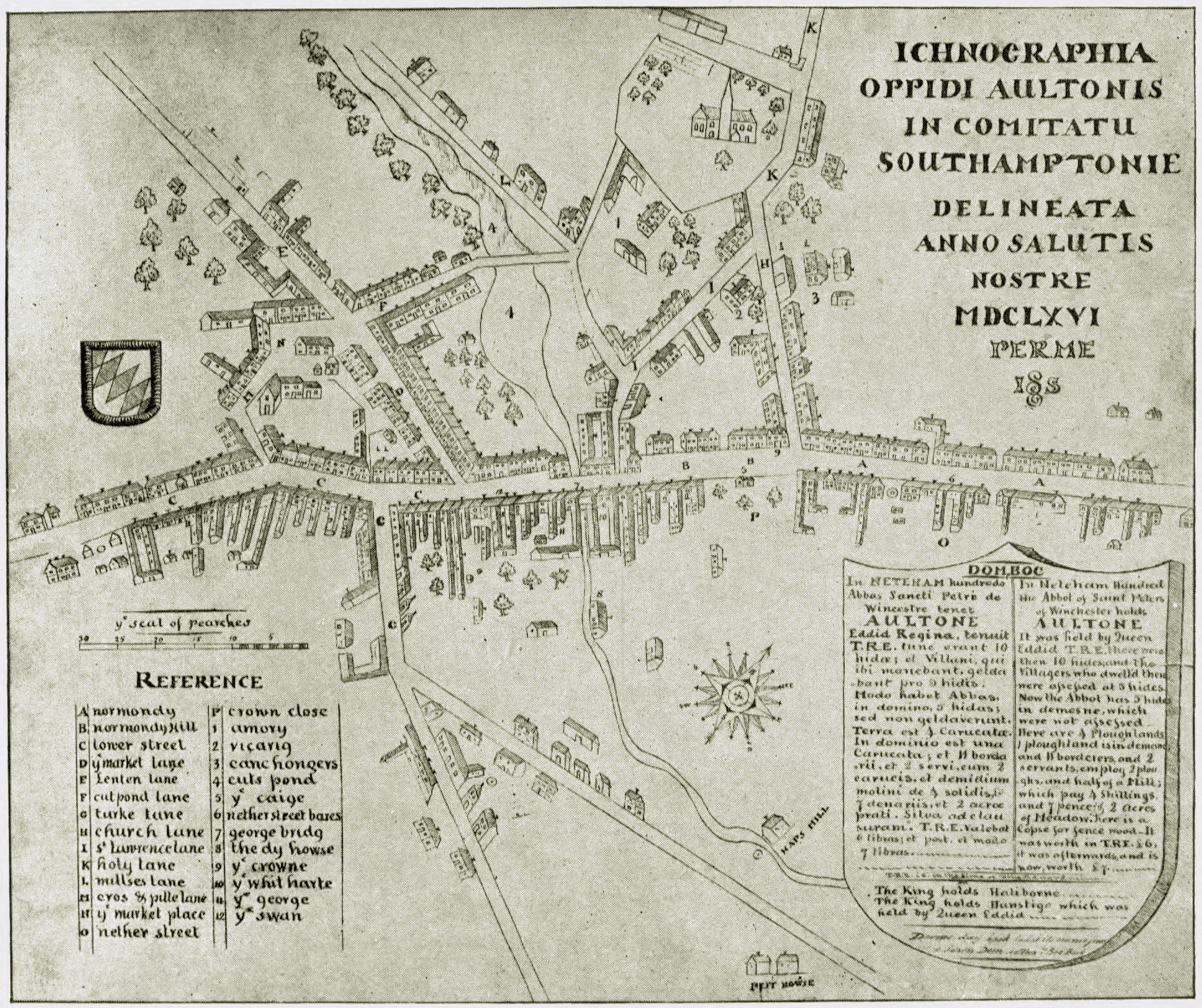
Map of Alton, 1666, 23 years after the Battle of Alton. Approximately 225 houses are depicted, indictating a population of around 1,125 (assuming 5 persons per household).

The Battle of Alton (also known as the Storming of Alton), of the First English Civil War, took place on 13 December 1643 in the town of Alton, Hampshire, England. There, Parliamentary forces serving under Sir William Waller led a successful surprise attack on a winter garrison of Royalist infantry and cavalry serving under the Earl of Crawford. The Battle of Alton was the first decisive defeat of Sir Ralph Hopton, leader of Royalist forces in the south, and the event had a significant psychological effect on him as commander. More important to Hopton was the loss of men, however, as he was already short-handed in much-needed infantry. The successful Parliamentarians were able, after their victory, to attack and successfully besiege Arundel, a larger and more formidable Royalist outpost to the south-east of Alton.

At dawn on 13 December, as Waller's army approached Alton, Crawford fled with the cavalry to Winchester, leaving Colonel Richard Boles to defend Alton with only the infantry. Outnumbered and overpowered, Boles's men were soon forced to seek refuge in the Church of St Lawrence, where they made a desperate last stand. Boles was killed, along with most of his remaining men. The Parliamentarians won a clear victory, losing only a few men and taking many prisoners.

Boles's fight is also notable for its demonstrated drama and heroism. Stories boast that Boles killed a number of his enemies before falling himself. The battle is known as one of the "most savage encounters" of the English Civil War. Musket holes from the fight can still be seen in the south door to the church and inside, where so many cornered men were killed or captured. The Battle of Alton was also the first battle in the English Civil War to use leather guns, employed effectively by Waller before and during the battle proper.

== Background ==
On 13 September 1643, the English Parliament ordered Major General William Waller to muster forces for the "protection" of Hampshire County. In November, he was given control of forces stationed in Farnham, a major Parliamentary staging ground, in order to take control of Kent, Surrey, Sussex and Hampshire. These forces were supplemented by a brigade of Trained Bands from London, the Westminster Red Regiment, the London Green Auxiliaries and the Tower Hamlets Yellow Auxiliaries. Also at Waller's disposal was a personal regiment of foot soldiers and surviving cavalry from the Battle of Roundway Down.

Waller marched from Farnham for Odiham and Alton, intending to occupy these towns while gradually approaching his objective, Basing. While not of great strategic importance, Basing's proximity to the main road between London, Salisbury, and Winchester made it worthy of attention. Marching toward Alton, Waller halted at Bentley Green on 3 November, where he determined his capabilities. He marched further that day, but later retreated to Farnham. On 2 November, Waller attacked one hundred men of Bennett's at Alton. From 7–9 November, Waller laid siege to Basing House, but withdrew to Basingstoke in failure, with his soldiers near mutiny from poor weather conditions. He tried again on the night of 11 November, but retreated to Farnham to await Hopton's army.

Hopton arrived on 27 November, given by King Charles 1,580 horse, but only around 2,000 conscripted infantry and 500 troops recently returned from fighting in Munster, Ireland. Hopton had been ordered in late September to make secure Dorset, Wiltshire and Hampshire, and to push as far as possible toward London. Toward this end, Hopton spread his men across Hampshire, quartering them for the winter at Winchester, Alresford, Petersfield and Alton. He did so to alleviate the burden on any one town, and because winter was approaching quickly. However, this left his army vulnerable. Hopton placed Crawford in charge of Alton, and on 1 December Crawford began to fortify the small town as quickly as he could. Crawford had at his disposal one cavalry regiment and one infantry regiment, though his exact number of men is unknown; it was likely around 1,000.

== Prelude ==
During the week prior to the Battle of Alton, Waller scouted the town and planned his attack. He confided his intent to only a few of his senior men, maintaining secrecy. Waller did make another raid on the evening of 9 December, where a small party of his forces struck at Crawford's lodging but fell back after the minor attack. During the morning hours of 12 December, Crawford sent a missive to Farnham, requesting of Waller that he be sent a "runlet of sack", promising an ox in exchange. When the wine was sent, Crawford refused to send the ox, challenging Waller to fetch it himself.

[Lieutenant Elias Archer remembered:] 'Our worthy Sir William sent in a loving compliment to the Lord Crawford half a hogshead of sack, who mistrusting the matter and the messenger, caused the messenger and divers [sic] others to taste thereof, and then caused it to be carefully laid by for his own drinking.' Waller demanded the promised ox, whereupon Crawford replied that he would bring it himself. Waller fails not at nightfall to go in search of his ox, and instead of a beast, brought away 565 prisoners.

During this exchange, Waller, eager to repair his reputation after Roundway Down, promptly decided to attack Alton, the nearest Royalist outpost to Farnham and only ten miles away. According to the Mercurius Aulicus, a contemporary publication, Crawford was watching only the main road from Farnham at this time.

== Battle ==
Waller mustered his men in Farnham Park near 10:30 p.m. on 12 December. At around midnight, 5,000 of Waller's men marched west from Farnham toward Basing House. The Parliamentarians marched about two miles in this direction (in order to confuse Royalist scouts), until around 1:00 a.m., before abruptly turning south toward Alton. The march was quick and quiet, owing to a long frost which had hardened the roads and Waller's judicious use of wooded areas. Also helpful in Waller's advance was his use of leather guns, here employed for the first time in the English Civil War. Unlike heavier artillery, a leather gun could be led by a single horse, transported efficiently over difficult terrain, and still be an effective tool for bombardment.

Waller's forces reached the western side of Alton at around 9:00 a.m., capturing six of Crawford's sentries posted in the north. One Royalist sentry, however, managed to raise the alarm just before dawn, leading Crawford and his horse to quit Alton and head for Winchester at a gallop, as Waller approached the town. It is reported that they had promised the remaining infantry men that they would return soon with reinforcements. Initially, Crawford and his cavalry attempted to flee from the eastern border of Alton, but were routed back into town and to the south (heading directly for Winchester) by Parliamentary horse. The fleeing Royalists were chased for a half-mile by Waller's heavy cavalry (these under Sir Arthur Haslerig and nicknamed the "Lobsters"), losing a few men and some number of horses. Haslerig, forfeiting pursuit, guarded the entrances to the town.

"I am certainly informed there were not above fifteen pieces found in the pocket of Colonel Bolles, who, until he fell himself, did bravely encourage and lead on his soldiers."

— Weekly Account of 20 December 1643

Meanwhile, Boles's men concentrated to the north-west corner of town, before the Church of St Lawrence. A regiment of Waller's infantry, five companies of Haslerig's, and five companies of Kentish Men attacked Alton from the north and north-west. The Royalist infantry, however, took effective cover inside buildings, out of which they fired quickly; they particularly favoured a large brick house near the church. This house, however, was soon abandoned as Waller's artillery, positioned at the foot of the hill to the west, fired upon it, forcing these defenders to retreat to the church. The Parliamentary regiments from London and four companies from Farnham Castle descended the hill: Waller's Red Regiment attacked a lunette and breastwork which the Royalists had built and which they were using as an effective fortification. The Green Regiment flanked the Royalists which were behind these fortifications, forcing them out, while marching through town under the cover of smoke from a thatch house which they had set on fire. Soon after, the rest of Waller's men entered the town en masse, flying their colours and pushing Boles's men back to the Church of St Lawrence. From the church and nearby fortifications (including a large earthwork on its north side), the Royalists held their ground for two hours. The Royalists fired from the windows of the church, and employed a scaffolding inside the church proper to fire from greater heights.

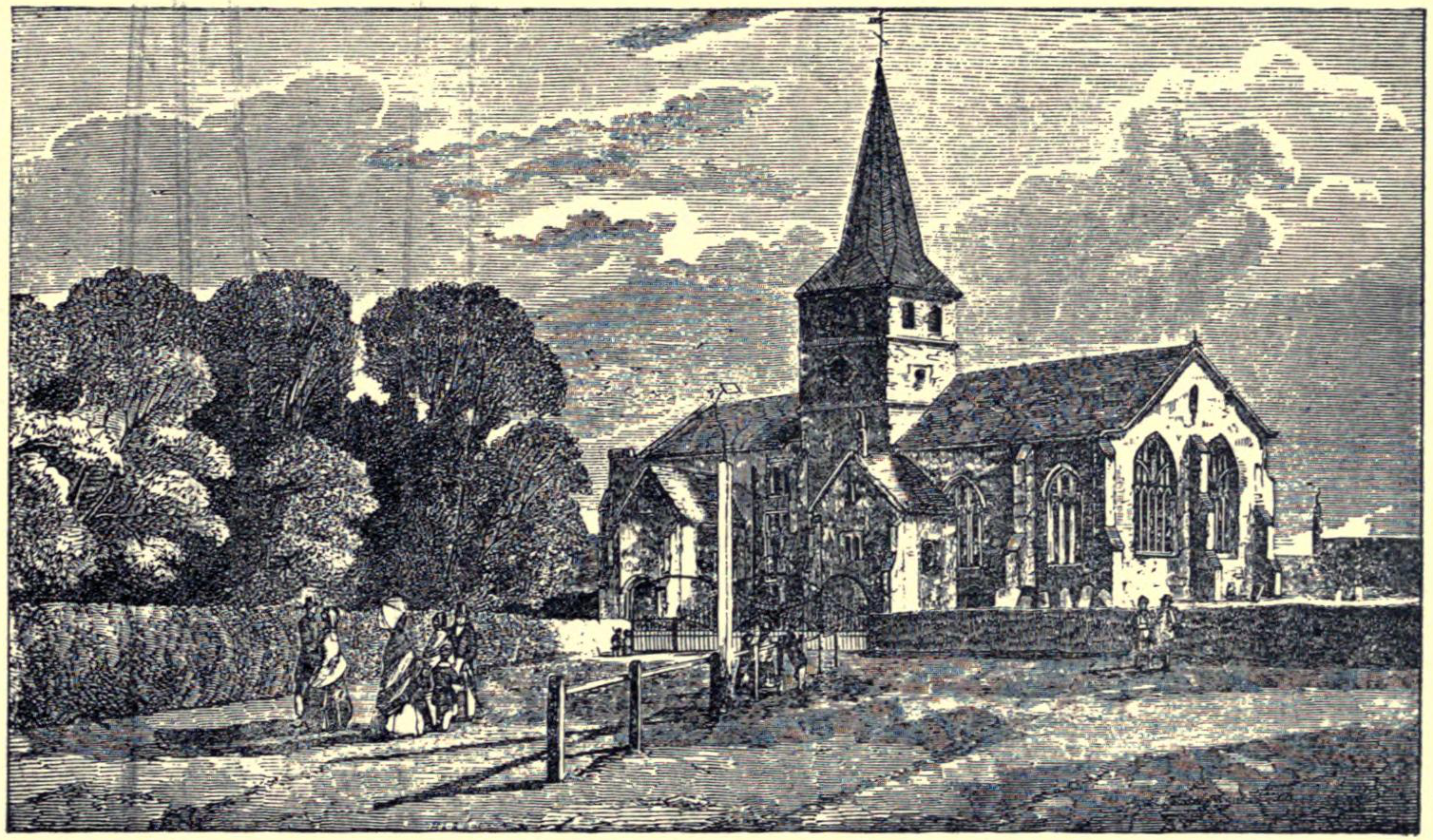
Church of St Lawrence, Alton (1830)

Eventually, the Parliamentarians forced the Royalists to abandon the south-east part of the wall around the church. However, since the retreating men had left their muskets sticking up, the Parliamentarians were temporarily unaware that the Royalists had left. After some time it was concluded that the defenders had gone, and the Parliamentary army promptly attacked the churchyard, driving the last of Boles's men into the church itself. Waller's forces threw hand grenades into the windows while working to enter the church themselves. Inside the building, Boles declared he would, "run his sword through him which first called for quarter." There had been no time for the Royalists to barricade the church doors, and the Parliamentarians soon managed to gain entry. Inside, the Royalists shot from behind a jury-rigged breastwork of dead horses. Some of Boles's men were killed; others surrendered. Boles did not give up, and he killed up to seven men before being killed himself. With Boles killed, all but a few of the Royalists requested quarter.

Inscribed in Boles's honour was this epitaph:

Alton will tell you of that famous Fight
Which ys man made, and bade this world good-night.
His Vertious Life fear'd not Mortality,
His body must, his Vertues cannot die,
Because his Bloud was there so nobly spent,
This is his Tombe; that Church his Monument.

Ricardus Boles, Wiltoniensis in Art. Mag.

Composuit Posuitque Dolens. An. Domi 1679.

== Aftermath ==
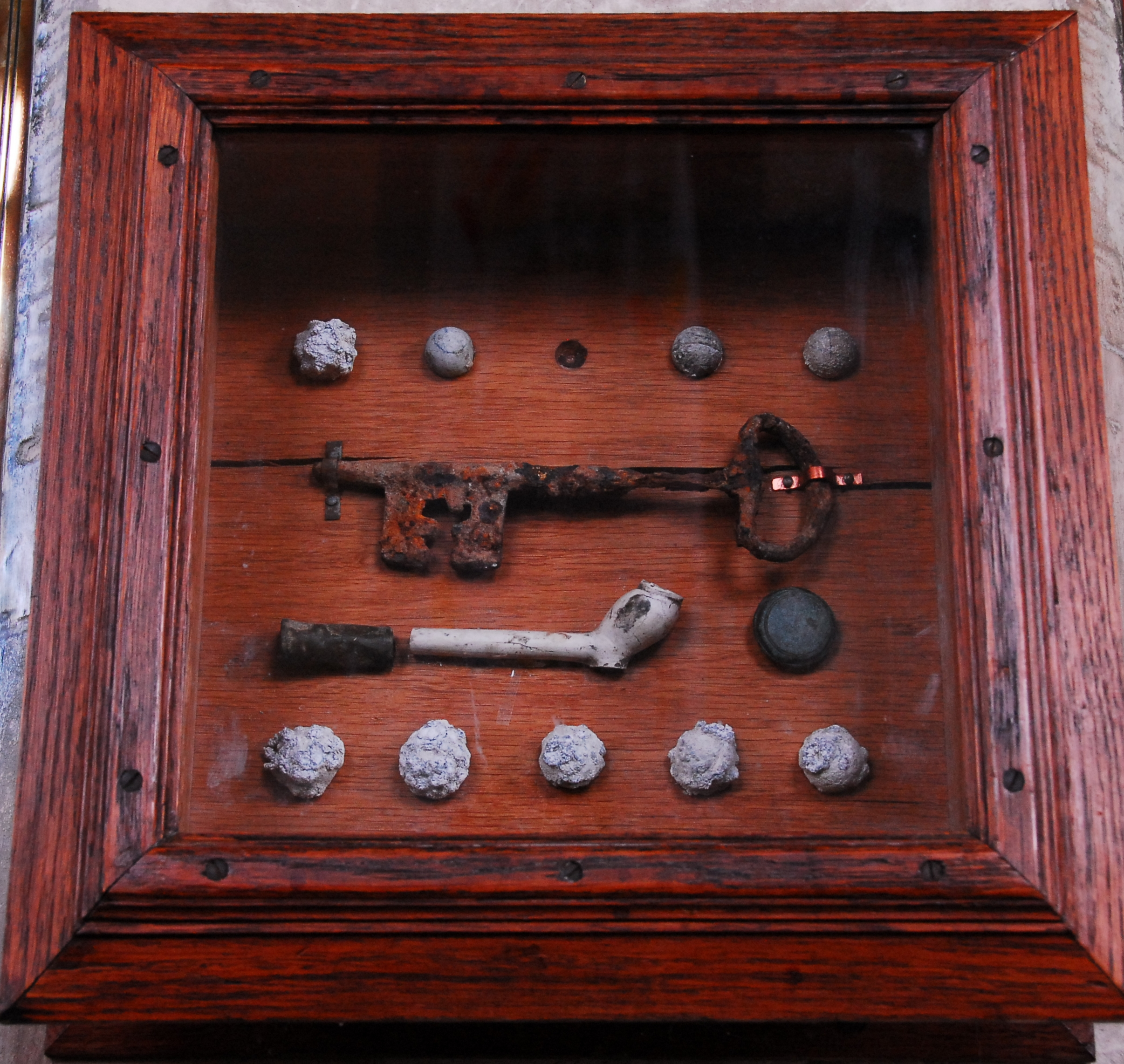
Archaeological finds from the Battle of Alton, on display in the Church of St Lawrence

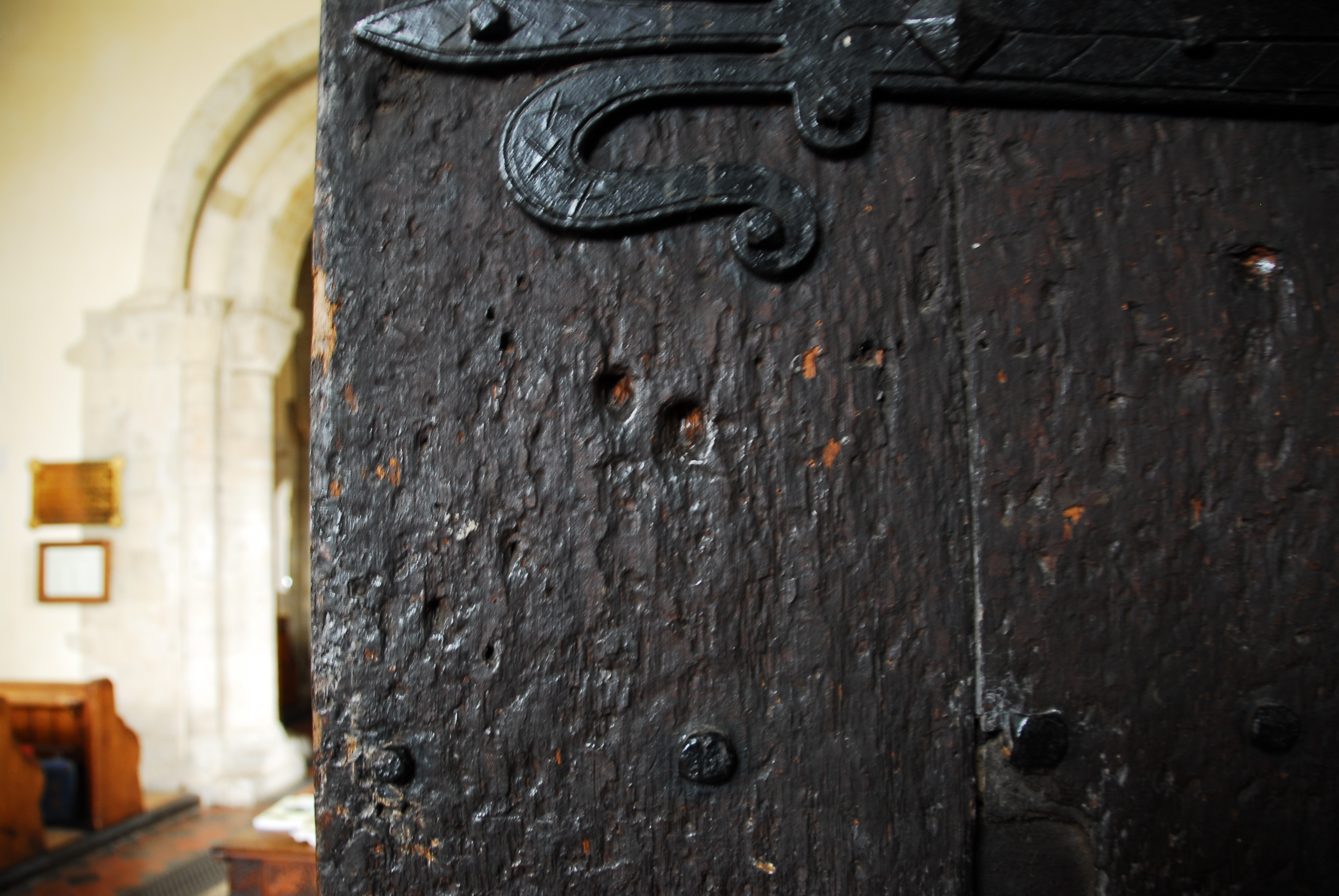
Musket holes still visible in the south door of the church

During and after the battle, Waller captured at least 500 men, around 100 of these re-enlisting with him. Additionally, more than 100 Royalist soldiers were killed. Together, the men lost represented nearly half of Hopton's infantry forces in the south. Waller, on the other hand, lost around ten men and gained much reputation for his success. Waller put his prisoners to work dragging the horse carcasses from the church, dismantling the scaffoldings inside, and burying their fallen comrades near the northern wall of the building. All of the captured men were then marched to Farnham tied together in pairs.

Waller ordered his men to demolish the town's fortifications, and had survivors that did not re-enlist paraded through the streets of London to mark his victory. Crawford's hat, cloak and gifted wine were all left behind in Alton. From then on, it was said that Crawford, in fleeing, "left his sack at Alton". King Charles, upon hearing of Boles's death, called for a mourning scarf, lamenting at the loss of what he considered to be one of "the best Commanders in this Kingdome". In the following weeks, letters were sent from Crawford and Hopton to Waller:

To Sir W. Waller.—Sir, I hope your gaining of Alton cost you dear. It was your lot to drinke of your own sack, which I never intended to have left for you. I pray you favour me so much as to send me my own chirurgion, and upon my honour I will send you a person suitable to his exchange.

Sir, your servant, Crawford

To Sir W. Waller.—Sir, This is the first evident ill success I have had. I much acknowledge that I have lost many brave and gallant men. I desire you, if Colonel Bolles be alive, to propound a fit exchange; if dead, that you will send me his corps. I pray you sende me a list of such prisoners as you have, that such choice men as they are may not continue long unredeemed. God give a sudden stop to this issue of English Blood, which is the desire, Sir, of you faithful friend to serve you.

Winton, 16 December. Ralf Hopton.

Hopton was severely depressed by his defeat at Alton, more than seemed appropriate given its rather small military importance.

On the Parliamentarian side, the morale boost enjoyed by Waller was significant, and on 15 December, the House of Commons of England ordered Sir Arthur Haslerig and Sir Gilbert Gerard to draft a letter to Waller commending him for his success. The Parliamentary victory at the Battle of Alton allowed Waller to advance south-east, and upon Arundel where he began a successful siege on the Royalists garrisoned there.

Hopton was unable to break the siege with his few remaining foot soldiers, and the 1,000 horse he received from Oxford were unhelpful. After the siege of Arundel, both armies were forced to retire for the winter due to the harsh weather.

== Notes ==
α: Other military encounters in Alton were considerably less significant historically. The phrase "Battle of Alton" refers unambiguously to this event.
β: Colonel Richard Boles name is given as Bolle in many sources. This convention may originate with Godwin's Civil War in Hampshire.
γ: Reports vary: he is said to have killed anywhere from two to seven men before being slain. Also, his manner of death is in dispute. He is reported to have been killed at the pulpit by some, e.g. Wedgwood; by the Mercurius Aulicus, he was struck in the head with the butt of a musket.
δ: Lieutenant-Colonel Birch is supposed to have been the first Parliamentarian to enter.
