= William Waller =

English soldier and politician (c. 1598-1668)

General Sir William Waller JP
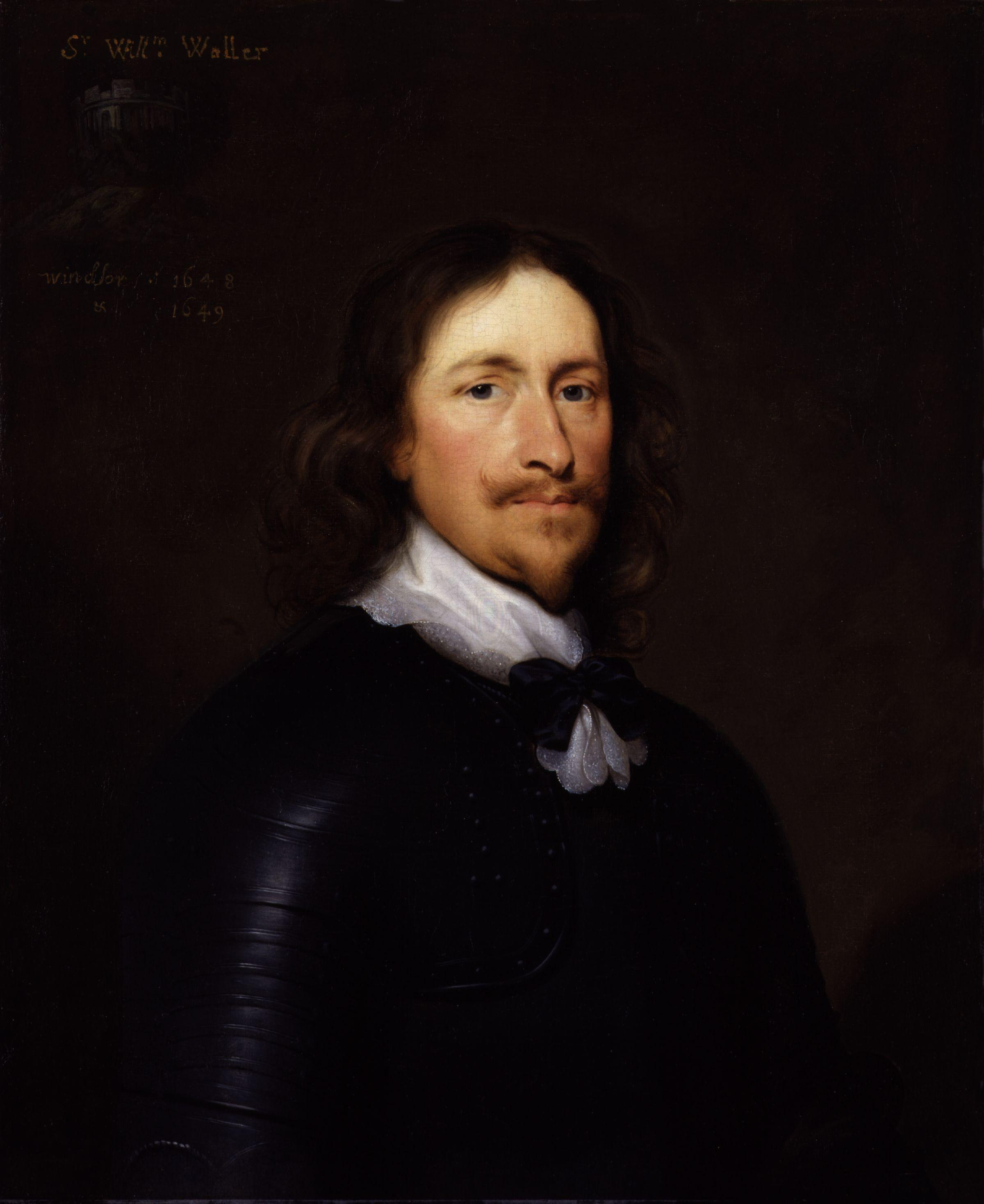
- Portrait by Cornelius Johnson, c. 1643

Member of Parliament for Middlesex
- In office 25 April 1660 – 29 December 1660

Member of Parliament for Andover
- In office 1640 – 1648 (suspended)

Personal details
- Born: 1598 Knole House, Kent, England
- Died: 19 September 1668 (aged 69–70) Osterley Park, Isleworth, Middlesex, England
- Resting place: Westminster Chapel
- Spouse(s): (1) Jane Reynell (1622–1633) (2) Anne Finch (1638–1652) (3) Anne Harcourt (1652–1661)
- Relations: Edmund Waller (1606–1687); Sir Hardress Waller (1604–1666)
- Children: (1) Margaret (1633–1694); (2) William (1639–1699)
- Parent(s): Sir Thomas and Lady Margaret Waller
- Education: Magdalen Hall, Oxford
- Occupation: Soldier and politician

Military service
- Years of service: 1617 to 1621, 1642 to 1645
- Rank: Major General
- Battles/wars: Uskok War; Thirty Years' War; Wars of the Three Kingdoms; Lansdowne; Roundway Down; Basing House; Alton; Arundel; Cheriton; Cropredy Bridge

Sir William Waller JP (c. 1598 – 19 September 1668) was an English soldier and politician, who commanded Parliamentarian armies during the First English Civil War. Elected MP for Andover to the Long Parliament in 1640, Waller relinquished his military positions under the Self-denying Ordinance in 1645. Although deeply religious and a devout Puritan, he belonged to the moderate Presbyterian faction, who opposed the involvement of the New Model Army in politics post 1646. As a result, he was one of the Eleven Members excluded by the army in July 1647, then again by Pride's Purge in December 1648 for refusing to support the Trial of Charles I, and his subsequent execution in January 1649.

Arrested several times during the British Interregnum, in the run-up to the Stuart Restoration in 1660, he was elected to the Convention Parliament. He retired from politics when it was dissolved, and died at his home in Osterley Park in September 1668. Waller was one of many who served in the Wars of the Three Kingdoms with great reluctance, but did so based on deeply held religious or political principles. He is perhaps best remembered by a letter written in 1643 to his close friend and Royalist opponent, Sir Ralph Hopton.

That great God who is the searcher of my heart knows with what a sad sense I go upon this service, and with what a perfect hatred I detest this war without an enemy;... We are both upon the stage and must act such parts as are assigned us in this tragedy, let us do it in a way of honour, and without personal animosities.

== Personal details ==
William Waller was born in Knole, near Sevenoaks in Kent, son of Sir Thomas Waller and his wife Margaret Lennard, the daughter of Margaret Fiennes, 11th Baroness Dacre. He attended Magdalen Hall, Oxford, then a well-known centre of Puritan education, but did not graduate. Both his father and grandfather served in Parliament, while his first cousin was Sir Hardress Waller.

He married three times; Jane Reynell (1622–1633), Lady Anne Finch (1638–1652), and Lady Anne Harcourt (1652–1661). In all, he had three sons and three daughters, only two of whom survived to adulthood; Margaret (1633–1694) and William (1639–1699).

== Military career in Europe ==
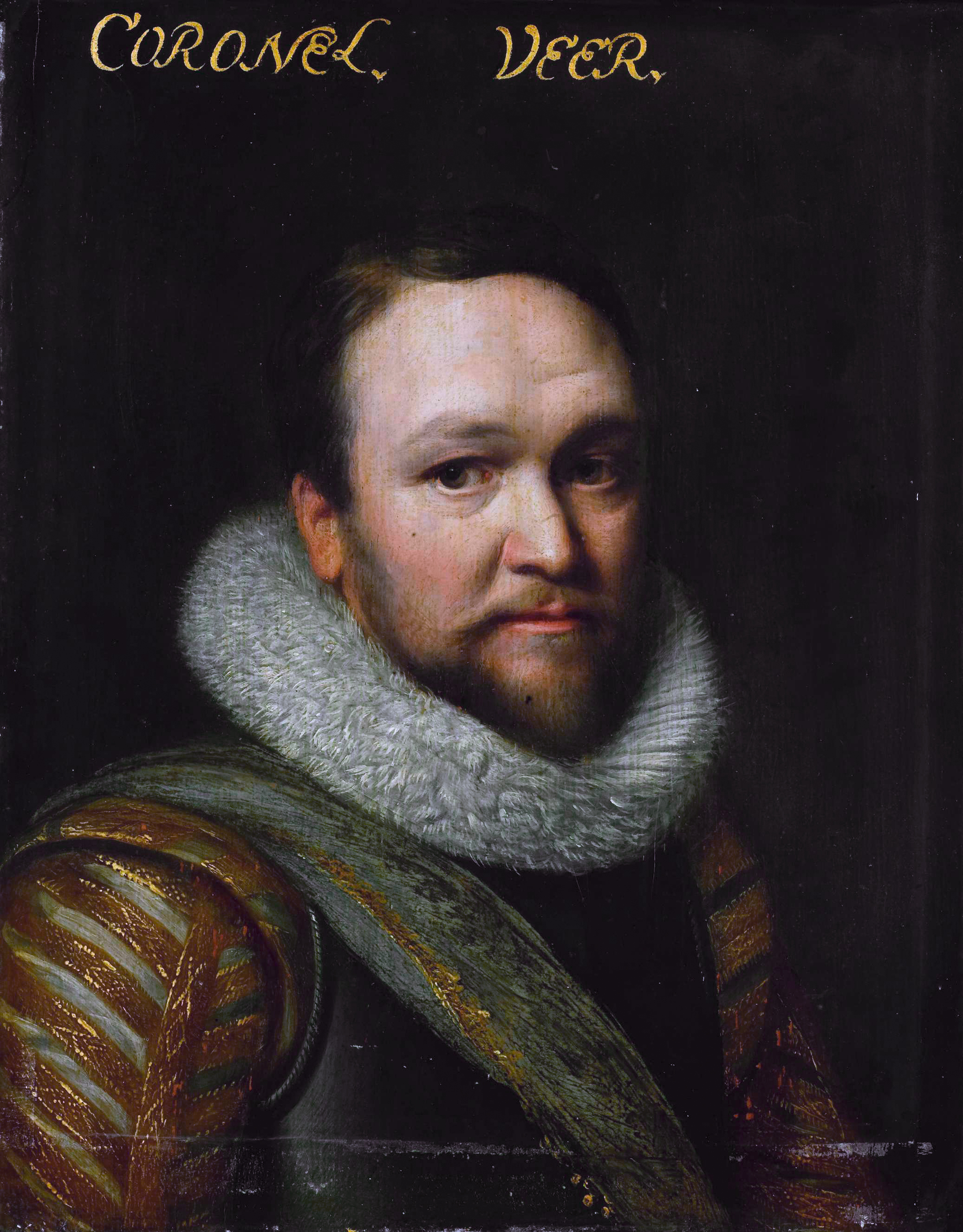
Sir Horace Vere; Waller served with him in Venice and Holland

The Waller family held various offices in the 16th century, including constable of Dover Castle and MP for Dover, but lost most of their money in the 1590s. William's father Thomas served in Ireland and in 1601 purchased the family estates at Groombridge from his uncle George Waller.

Waller followed his father by becoming a professional soldier and in 1617, he joined the army of the Venetian Republic, where he met the English mercenary leader, Sir Horace Vere. In 1620, he and Sir Ralph Hopton were members of the personal bodyguard for Elizabeth, Queen of Bohemia, sister of the future Charles I. After her husband Frederick was defeated at White Mountain in November, they escorted her to safety in Frankfurt.

On his return to England in 1622, he was rewarded with a knighthood, while he inherited the right to wine import duties from his grandmother, which brought him the then substantial sum of £1,000 – £3,000 per year. This allowed him to marry Jane Reynell, from a wealthy Devon family; she died in 1633, followed by her father in 1634, then their son Richard in 1636. Waller inherited most of her estates, and he purchased a quarter-share in the Providence Island Company. A devout Presbyterian, this directly connected to others who shared his beliefs, and later became prominent supporters of Parliament, among them John Pym, Henry Darley, Lord Saye, and Lord Brooke.

His second wife, Lady Anne Finch, was related to another influential Kent politician, the Earl of Winchilsea, and shared his religious beliefs. They purchased Winchester Castle in 1638, and lived a 'retired life' in the country, but as the political conflict between Charles and Parliament increased, Waller felt it his duty to participate. In April 1640, he was elected to the Short Parliament as Member of Parliament for Andover, then re-elected to the Long Parliament on 3 May 1642.

== Wars of the Three Kingdoms ==
Waller's war, England & Wales, 1642–1645

A firm supporter of Parliament, when the First English Civil War began in August 1642, Waller was appointed a colonel, capturing Portsmouth, Farnham, Winchester and other key locations in southern England. In early 1643, Waller was promoted Major-general and given command of the Western Association army, his opponent being Sir Ralph Hopton, an old friend leading Royalist forces in the west.

After the inconclusive Battle of Lansdowne on 5 July, Hopton was joined by Prince Maurice and on 13 July, their combined force destroyed Waller's army at Roundway Down. Waller and around 500 cavalry escaped to Bristol, much of whose garrison had been lost at Roundway Down; not wishing to be trapped in the city, on 21 July he and his remaining troops made their way to Evesham. Four days later, Bristol surrendered to Prince Rupert, leaving Parliamentarian forces in the west confined to isolated garrisons in Plymouth and elsewhere.

Although defeat had little impact on Waller's military reputation, there were increasing signs on all sides of war weariness, including anti-war demonstrations on 7 to 9 August in London. At a strategy meeting in Oxford, the Royalist high command agreed Prince Rupert would capture Gloucester, the last major Parliamentary position in the west, then move against London. This would be supported by Hopton advancing into Hampshire and Sussex, whose iron foundries were Parliament's main source of armaments.

Waller assembled a new army at Farnham Castle, consisting of Trained Bands from the South-Eastern Association of Kent, Sussex and Hampshire, bolstered by others from London. Throughout the war, both sides relied on these militia; service was normally limited to 30 days, within their home area, but as the largest and best equipped, London units were often used by Parliament to fill gaps. Waller's army included several regiments mustered to repel Prince Rupert's advance on London, which ended at Newbury in late September. An attack on Basing House in November failed, with many shouting 'Home! Home!'

Under instructions from the Earl of Essex to retake Alton, then Arundel, Waller persuaded the London Bands to help him capture Alton on 13 December. When he asked for their help with Arundel, they refused, and were sent home on 15 December. However, he successfully captured Arundel on 6 January, before a heavy snow fall ended operations for the next few weeks. By the end of February, Waller's army had been increased to 5,000 infantry and 3,500 horse; he was ordered to slip past Hopton and retake the west. Despite the defection of Sir Richard Grenville in early March, who shared this information with Hopton, Waller defeated him at Cheriton on 29 March 1644, ending the Royalist threat in the south-east.

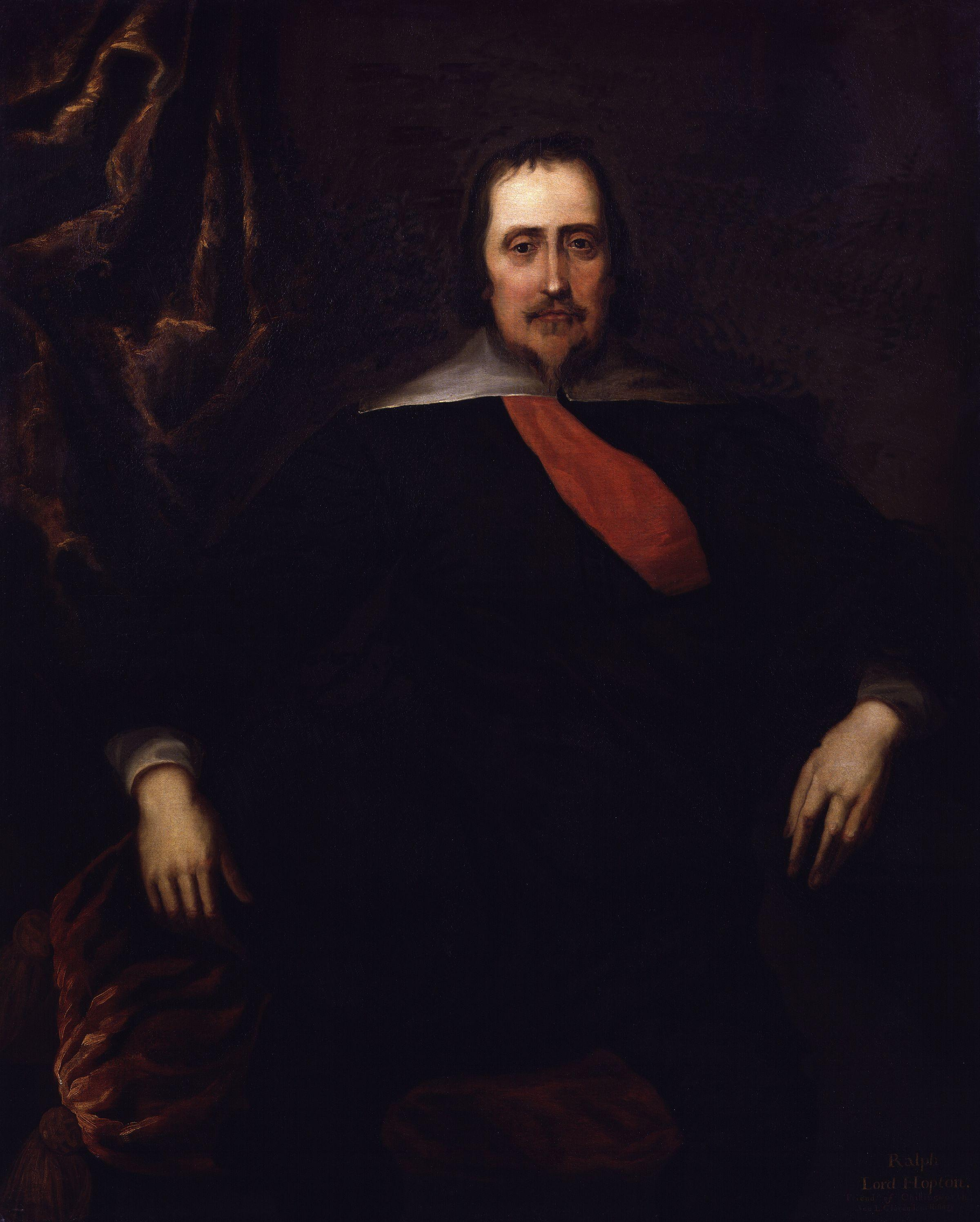
Ralph Hopton, Waller's close friend and opponent

Waller now joined Essex to attack Oxford; to avoid being trapped there, Charles and the main Royalist field army retreated to Worcester; Essex ordered Waller to follow him, while he went west to relieve the siege of Lyme Regis. On 29 June, Waller clashed with Charles at Cropredy Bridge; his losses were minimal, but his men were demoralised. His army disintegrated, causing panic in London, and allowing Charles to pursue Essex into the West Country.

Essex was defeated at Lostwithiel in September and although he escaped with the cavalry, 5,000 infantry were forced to surrender. At Second Newbury on 27 October, the Royalists lifted the siege of Donnington Castle; lack of co-ordination among the Parliamentary forces under Waller, Essex and Manchester allowed Charles to re-enter Oxford.

Parliament was split between those who wanted an immediate, negotiated settlement and those for whom military victory was the only way to secure their objectives. They also objected to the Scottish alliance, especially the demand for a unified, Presbyterian church of England and Scotland; Oliver Cromwell claimed he would fight, rather than accept such terms. This conflict became public in recriminations over the failure to exploit Marston Moor, Essex' capitulation at Lostwithiel, and Manchester's alleged unwillingness to fight at Second Newbury; Waller supported these criticisms. In December, Sir Henry Vane introduced the Self-denying Ordinance, requiring any officers in the army or navy who were also members of Parliament to resign from one, or the other. This automatically removed Manchester and Essex, since they could not resign their titles, although later amended to allow them to be re-appointed, 'if Parliament approved.' Waller supported the Ordinance, and resigned his commission in April 1645.

== Later life and death ==
Considered for command in Ireland, Waller also briefly explored returning to Venetian service, but this ended his active military career. Although he backed the creation of the New Model Army, like other Presbyterians, he came to see it as a threat, and supported attempts to disband it when the war ended in 1646. In June 1647, he was one of the Eleven members accused by Cromwell and other Independents of 'plotting to destabilise the kingdom', and fled abroad in August.

He stayed in The Hague, where he renewed his acquaintance with Elizabeth of Bohemia, before returning home in June 1648. He was arrested in 1650, allegedly for conspiring to restore Charles II, then released in early 1652. He purchased Osterley Park in 1654, and while frequently questioned under the Protectorate, avoided implication in the 1655 Penruddock uprising.

At the 1660 Restoration, he was elected for Middlesex to the Convention Parliament, but subsequently retired from political life. He spent some of his time writing A Vindication of the Character and Conduct of Sir William Waller, which was not published until 1793.

He died on 19 September 1668, and was buried in Westminster Abbey.

== Sources ==
- Adair, John (1997). Roundhead General: the Campaigns of Sir William Waller. Thrupp, Gloucestershire: Sutton. ISBN 0-7509-1312-6.
- Cotton, ANB (1975). "Cromwell and the Self-Denying Ordinance". History. 62 (205): 211–231. doi:10.1111/j.1468-229X.1977.tb02337.x. JSTOR 24411238.
- Donagan, Barbara (2008). "Waller, Sir William". Oxford Dictionary of National Biography (online ed.). Oxford University Press. doi:10.1093/ref:odnb/28561. (Subscription, Wikipedia Library access or UK public library membership required.)
- Duinen, Jared, van (2007). The Nature of Puritan Opposition in 1630s England in "Prosopography Approaches" and Applications: A Handbook. University of Oxford Linacre College Unit for Prosopographical Research. ISBN 978-1900934121.
- Firth, CH (1911). February 1643: Ordinance to appoint Sir William Waller Serjeant Major General of the Forces in Gloucester and other adjacent Counties, and for paying his Army' in Acts and Ordinances of the Interregnum, 1642–1660 Volume I. HMSO.
- Firth, Charles Harding; Leslie, JH (1925). "The Siege and capture of Bristol by Royalist forces in 1643". Journal of the Society for Army Historical Research. 4 (18): 180–203. JSTOR 44227516.
- Henning, Basil, ed. (1983). 'Sir William Waller, (1598–1668) in 'The House of Commons, 1660–90 (The History of Parliament Trust). Haynes Publishing. ISBN 978-0436192746.
- Kupperman, Karen (1982). Providence Island 1630–1641: The Other Puritan Colony. Cambridge University Press. ISBN 978-0521352055.
- Lefevre, Peter (2010). WALLER, Sir Thomas (c.1569–1613), of Groombridge and Dover Castle, Kent; formerly of Brenchley, Kent. in The History of Parliament: the House of Commons 1604–1629. CUP. Archived from the original on 2 May 2021.
- Nagel, Lawson Chase (1982). The militia of London, 1641–1649. University of London.
- Plant, David (7 August 2010). Biography of Sir William Waller. British Civil Wars and Commonwealth website. Archived from the original on 9 October 2008.
- Rees, John (2016). The Leveller Revolution. Verso. ISBN 978-1784783907.
- Royle, Trevor (2004). Civil War: The War of the Three Kingdoms 1638–1660. Brown, Little. ISBN 978-0316861250.
- Waller, Sir William (1793). Vindication of the Character and Conduct of Sir William Waller. Debrett.
- Wanklyn, Frank; Jones, Robert (2005). A Military History of the English Civil War: 1642–1649. Pearson Longman. ISBN 978-0582772816.
- Wedgwood, CV (1958). The King's War, 1641–1647 (2001 ed.). Penguin Classics. ISBN 978-0141390727.

Parliament of England
Preceded by Francis Gerard; Chaloner Chute	Member of Parliament for Middlesex; 1660–1661; With: Sir Lancelot Lake	Succeeded by Sir Lancelot Lake; Sir Thomas Allen
