= Farnham Castle =

Former castle of the bishop of Winchester

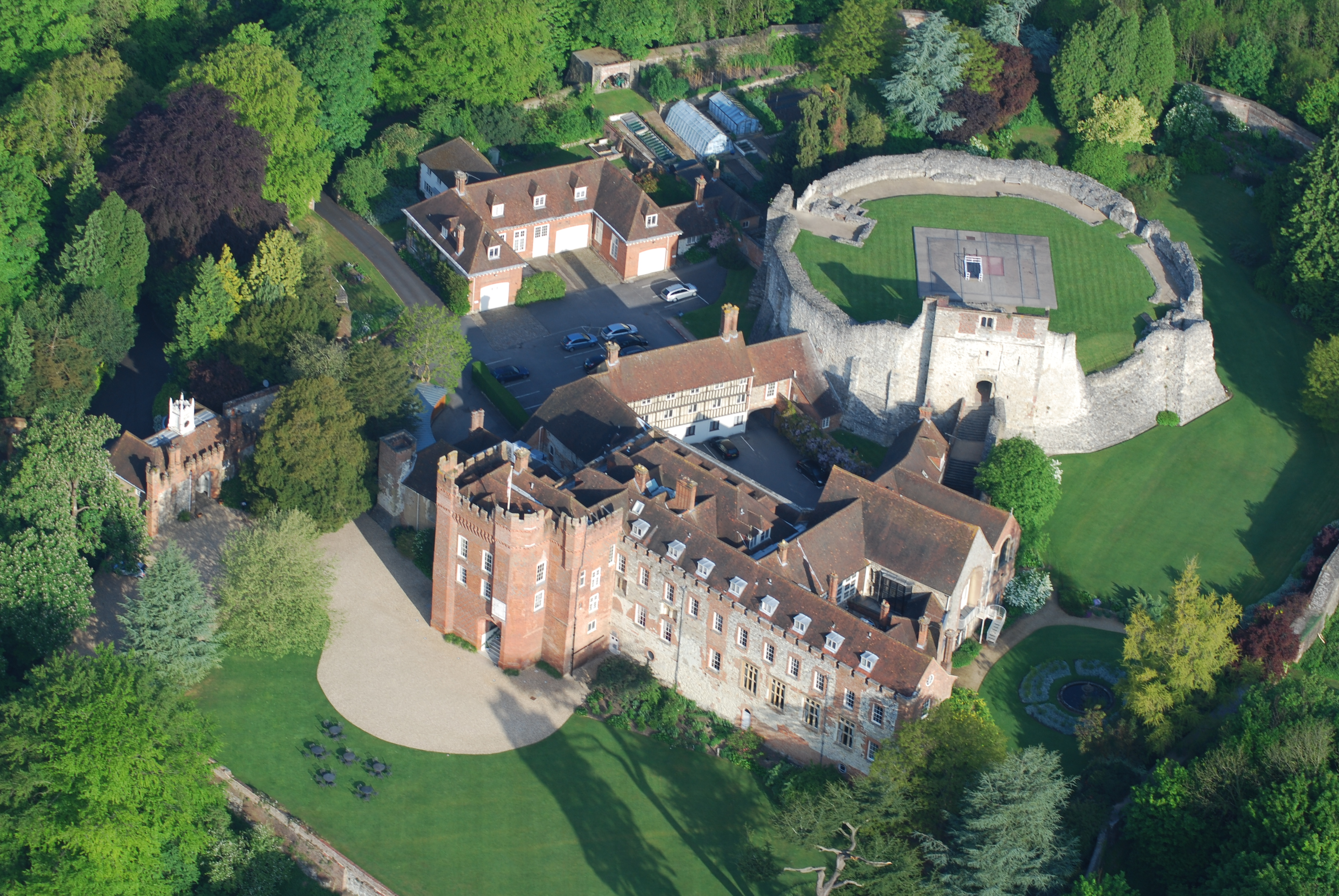
- Aerial view
- Interactive map of Farnham Castle
- 51.219°N 0.8025°W

Listed Building – Grade I
- Official name: Farnham Castle (comprising castle buildings to the south only), Castle Hill
- Designated: 26 April 1950
- Reference no.: 1044677

Farnham Castle is a 12th-century castle in Farnham, Surrey, England. It was formerly the residence of the Bishops of Winchester.

== History ==
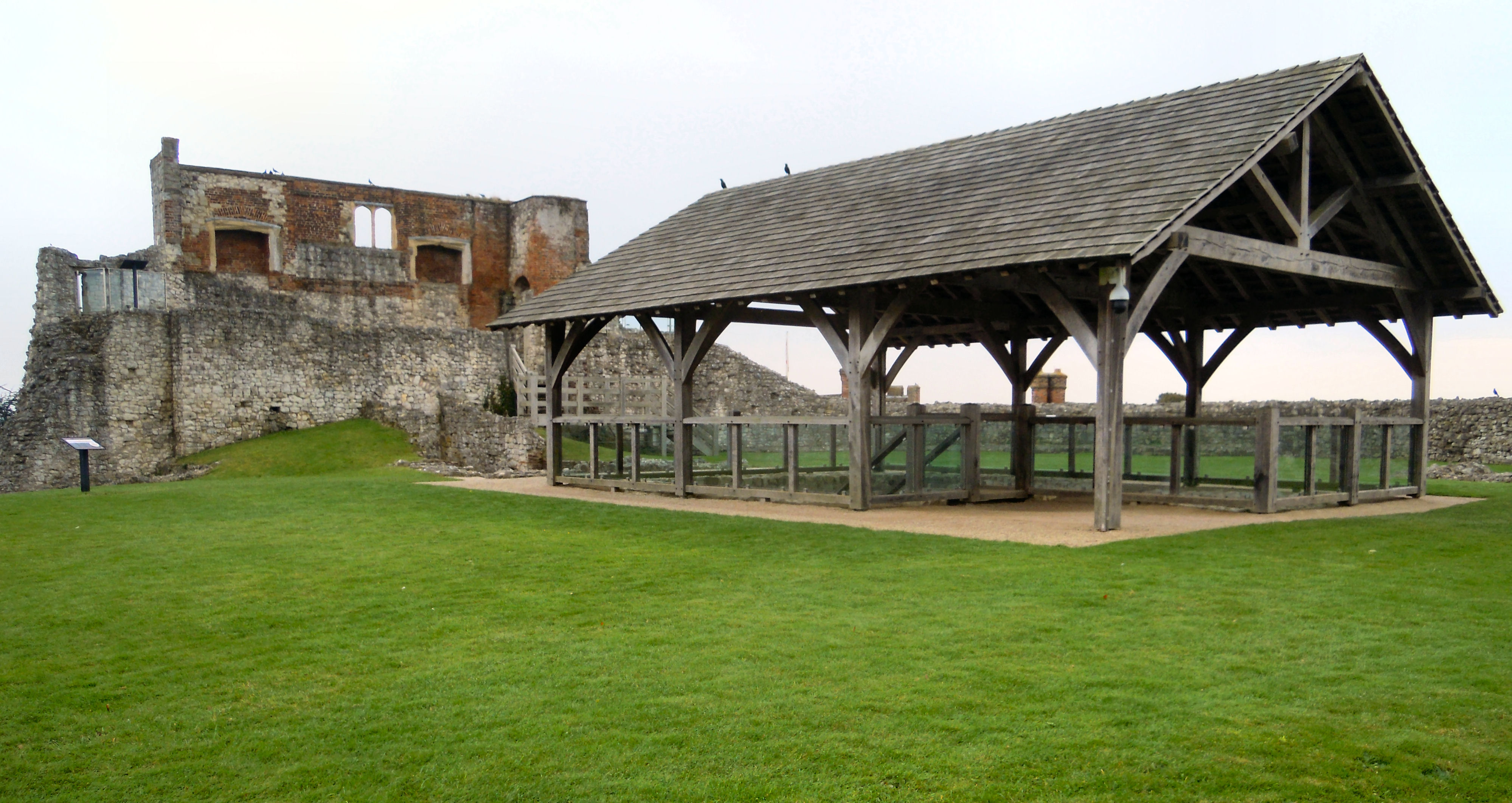
Inside the keep

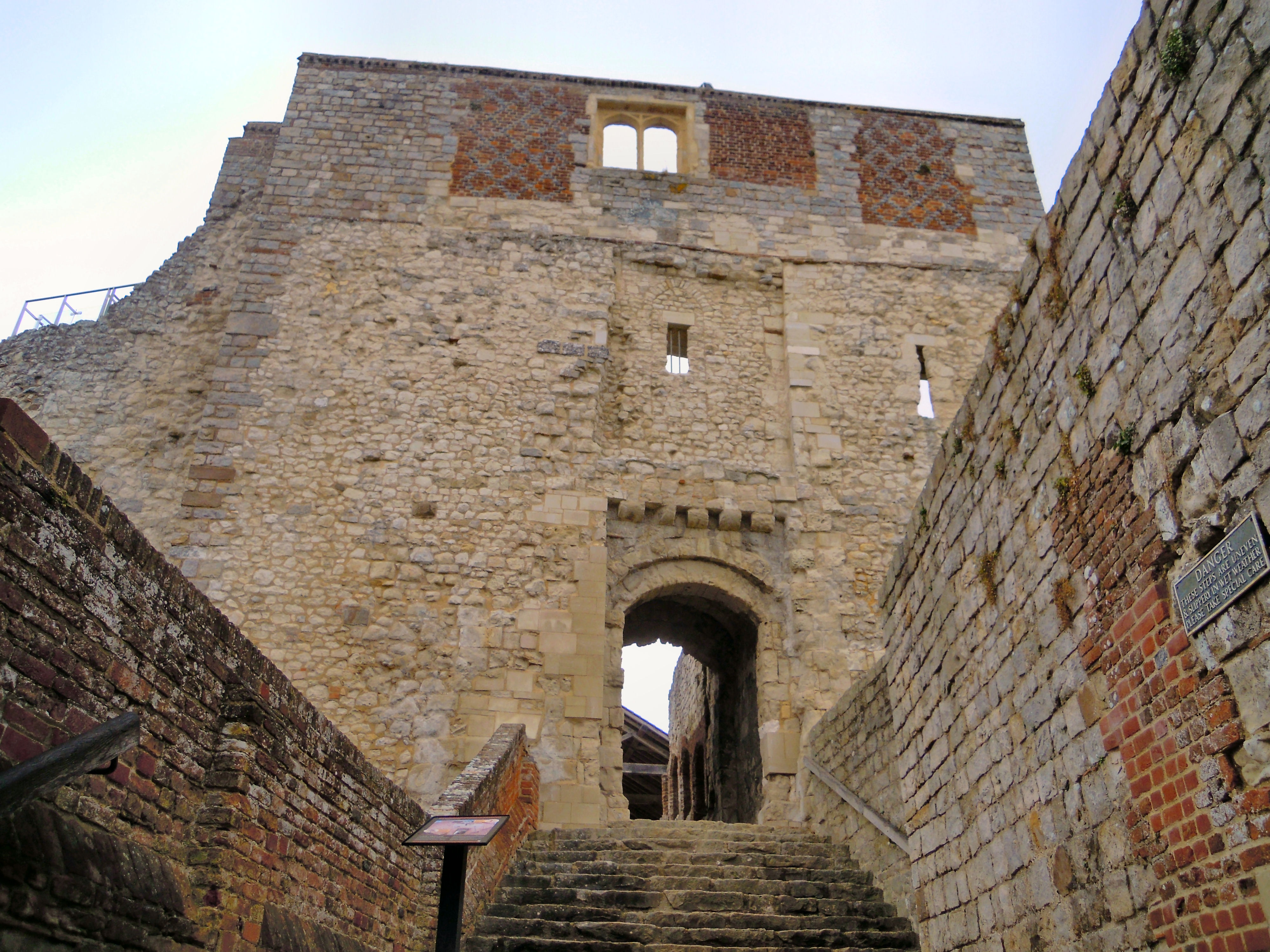
Site of the keep's drawbridge

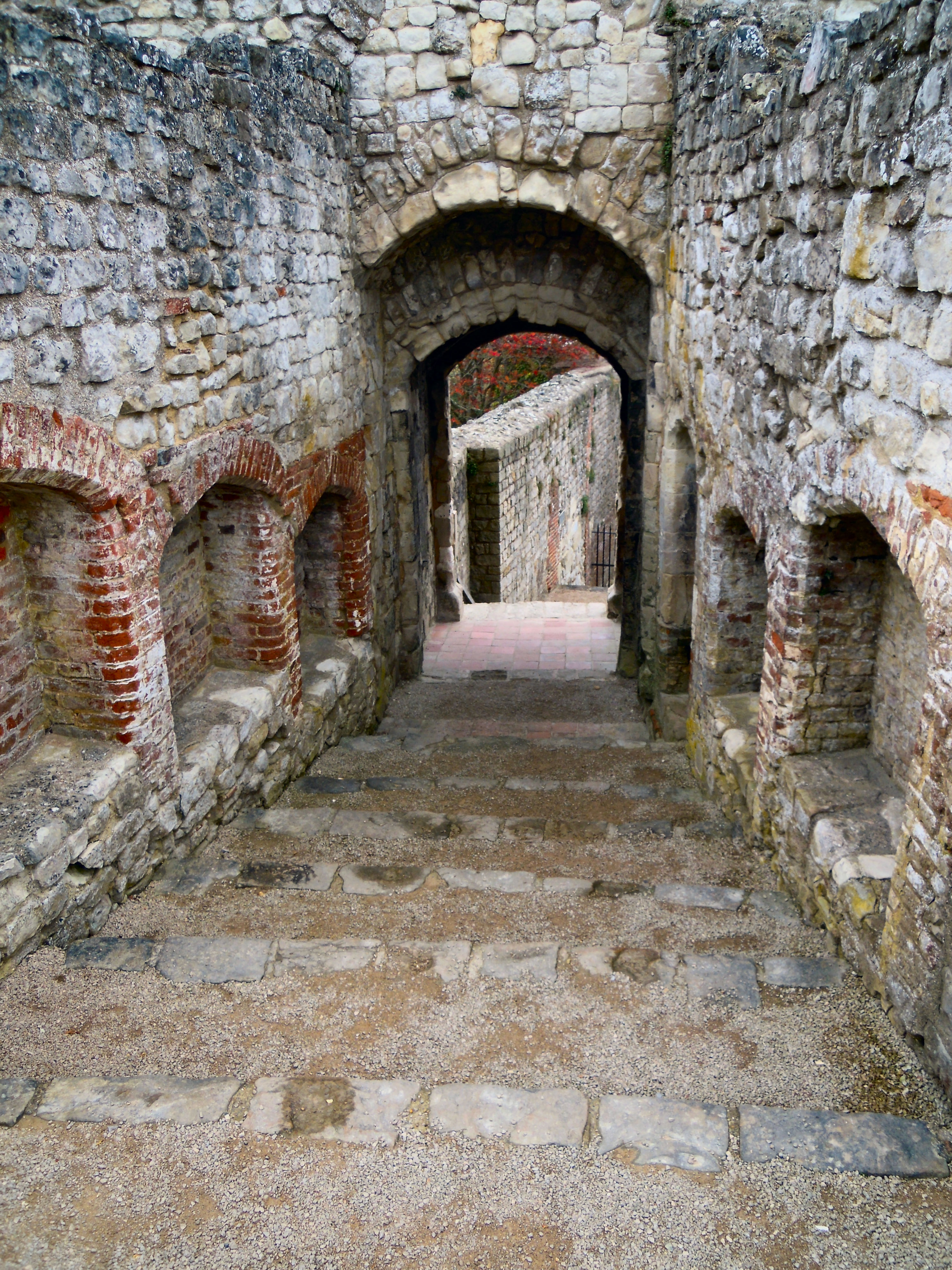
Looking down the entrance to the keep

Built in 1138 by Henri de Blois, Bishop of Winchester, grandson of William the Conqueror, Farnham castle became the home of the Bishops of Winchester for over 800 years. The original building was slighted (demolished) by Henry II in 1155 after 'the Anarchy' and then rebuilt in the late 12th and early 13th centuries. In the early 15th century, it was the residence of Cardinal Henry Beaufort who presided at the trial of Joan of Arc in Rouen in 1431. It is for this reason that St Joan of Arc's Church in Farnham is dedicated to her.

The castle's architecture reflects changing styles through the ages, making it one of the most important historical buildings in the south of England. It is an impressive stone motte and bailey fortress, and has been in almost continuous occupation since the 12th century. The large motte was formed around the massive foundations of a Norman tower and then totally enclosed by a shell keep, with buttress turrets and a shallow gatehouse. Attached to the motte is a triangular inner bailey, with a fine range of domestic buildings and a fifteenth-century brick entrance tower. The formidable outer bailey curtain wall has square flanking towers, a 13th-century gatehouse and a large ditch.

Mary I of England stayed at Farnham Castle in the days before her wedding to Philip of Spain in July 1554. The stables burnt down during a visit by King James, Anne of Denmark, and Henry, Prince of Wales in July 1609. The castle was slighted again after the Civil War in 1648. Since then more buildings have been constructed in the castle's grounds, the most impressive being those built by Bishop George Morley in the 17th century.

The castle is set in five acres (20,000 m^{2}) of gardens overlooking the town of Farnham. A letter in 1594 mentions that white clay was dug in Farnham Park to make drinking vessels used by lawyers at the Inner Temple in London.

By the 20th century a garden had been established within the shell keep. In 1933 the Office of Works was given custodianship of the castle.

=== Camouflage Development & Training Centre ===
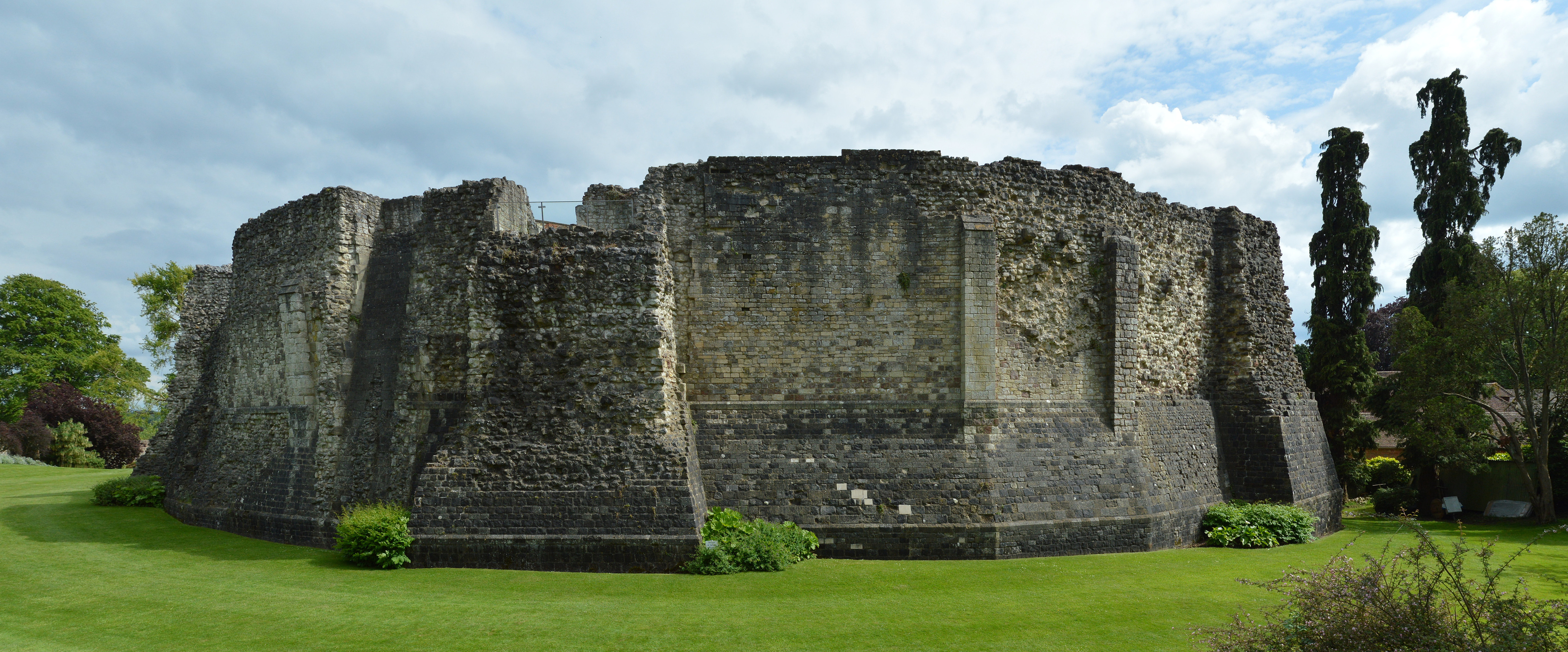
The shell keep of Farnham Castle

During the Second World War, the castle was the home of the Camouflage Development and Training Centre (CDTC) of the Camouflage Branch of the Royal Engineers. Here, artists such as Roland Penrose and Julian Trevelyan as well as the magician Jasper Maskelyne were trained in the arts of military camouflage.

Since 1962, the castle has been used as an intercultural training and conference centre.

== Public tours ==
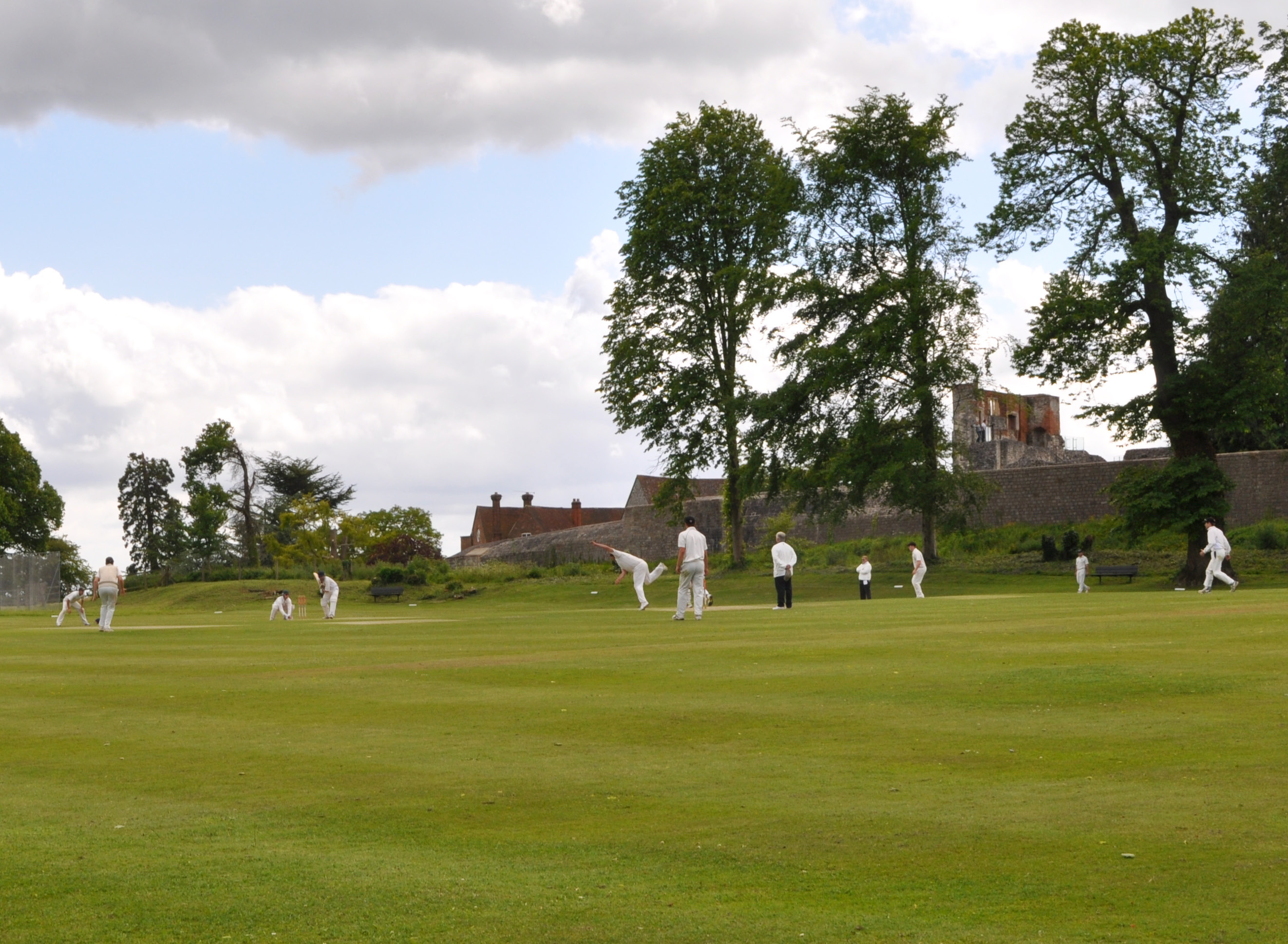
The castle seen from the north in June 2015

With the help of the Heritage Lottery Fund, the keep and Bishop's Palace have undergone a complete renovation, and are now managed by Farnham Castle. The keep re-opened in July 2010 displaying the extended research that has been undertaken into the history surrounding the castle; there is also an exhibition on site open to the public covering the 900 Years of Living History of Farnham Castle.

English Heritage has guardianship of the keep, but Farnham Castle now manages the visitors to the keep. Entry is free. Local guides provide tours of the Bishop's Palace (certain days only, charge applies).

== Architecture ==
The extent of Farnham Castle is marked by a stone curtain wall. In the area enclosed by the wall is a collectio of building; there is a shell keep on a mound at the north end of the cluster of buildings, with ranges to the south.

== See also ==
- Caesar's Camp
- Castles in Great Britain and Ireland
- List of castles in England
