= Thiruvananthapuram =

Metropolis and capital of Kerala, India

Thiruvananthapuram Tiruvanantapuraṃ (Malayalam) Trivandrum
- Metropolis
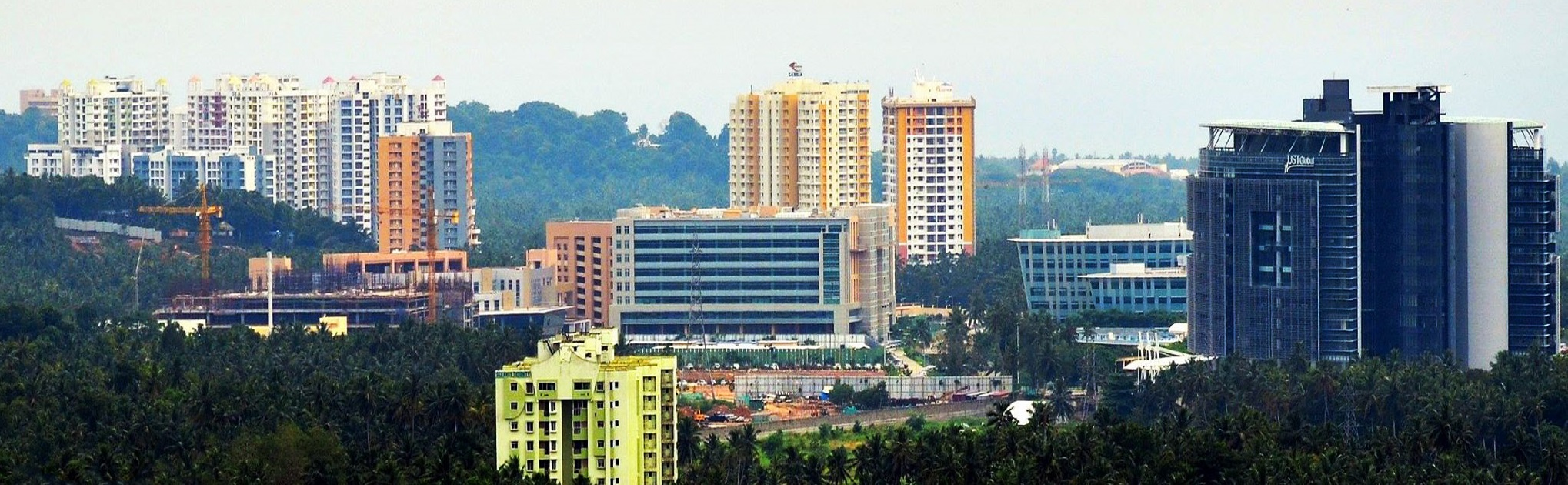
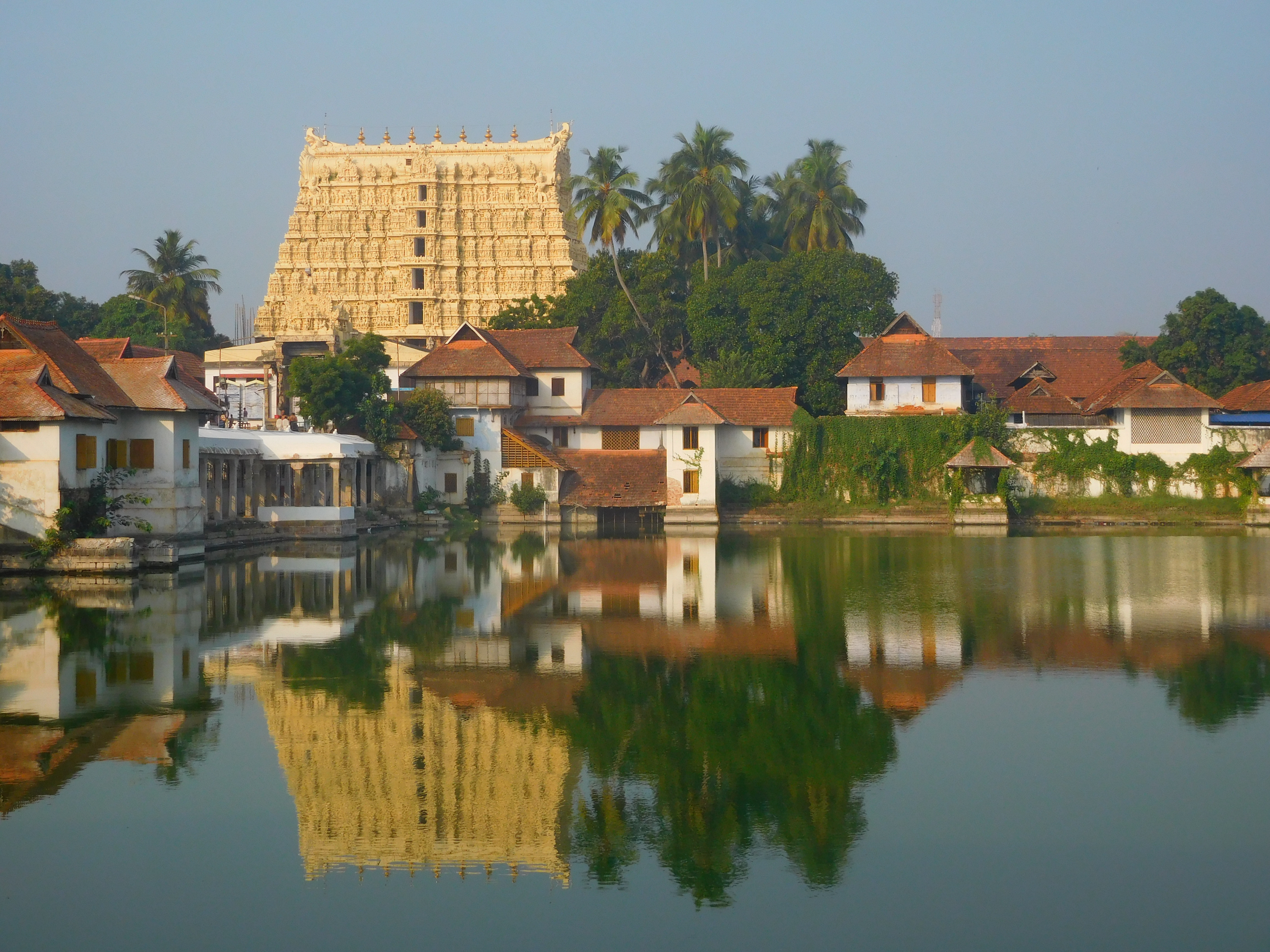
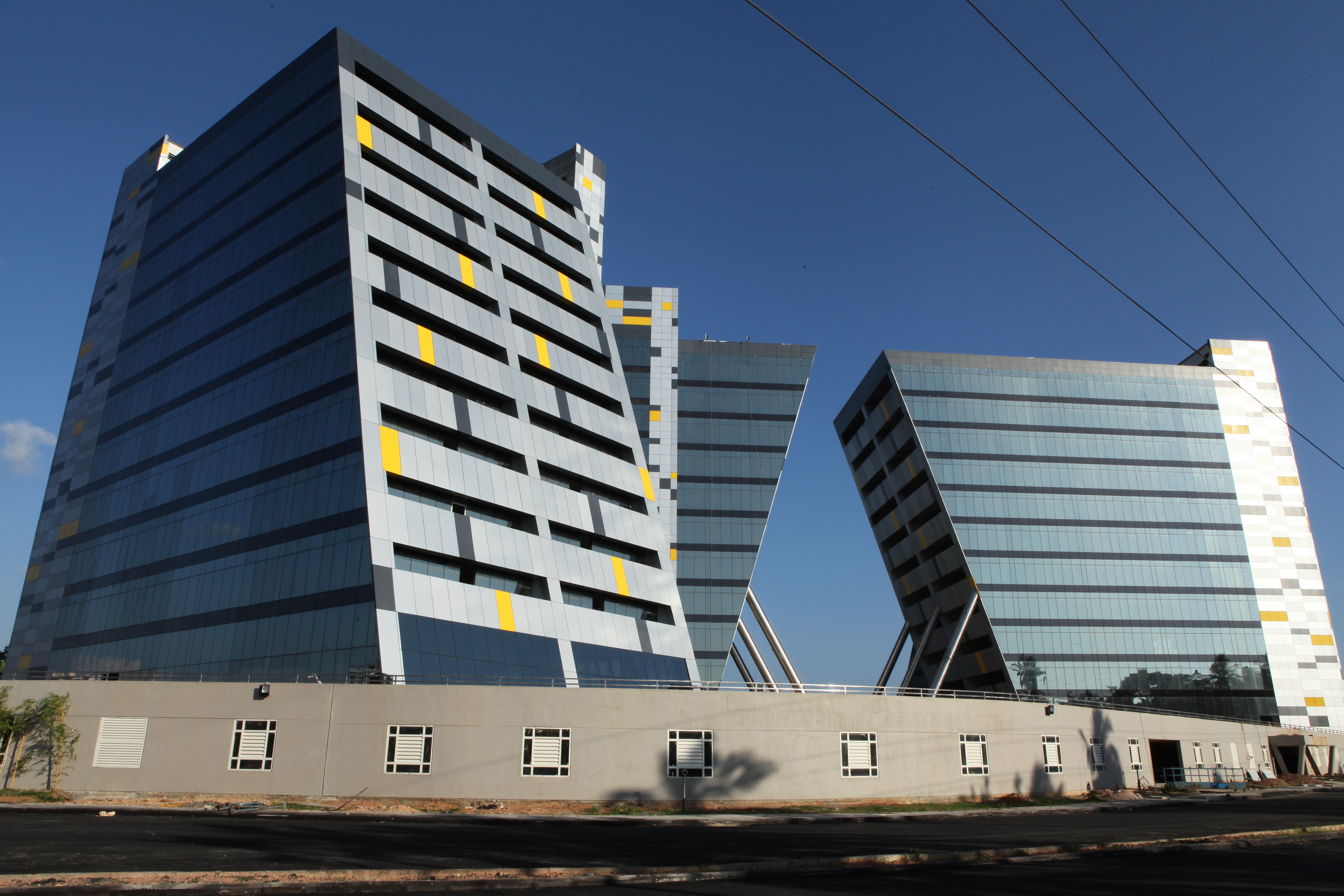
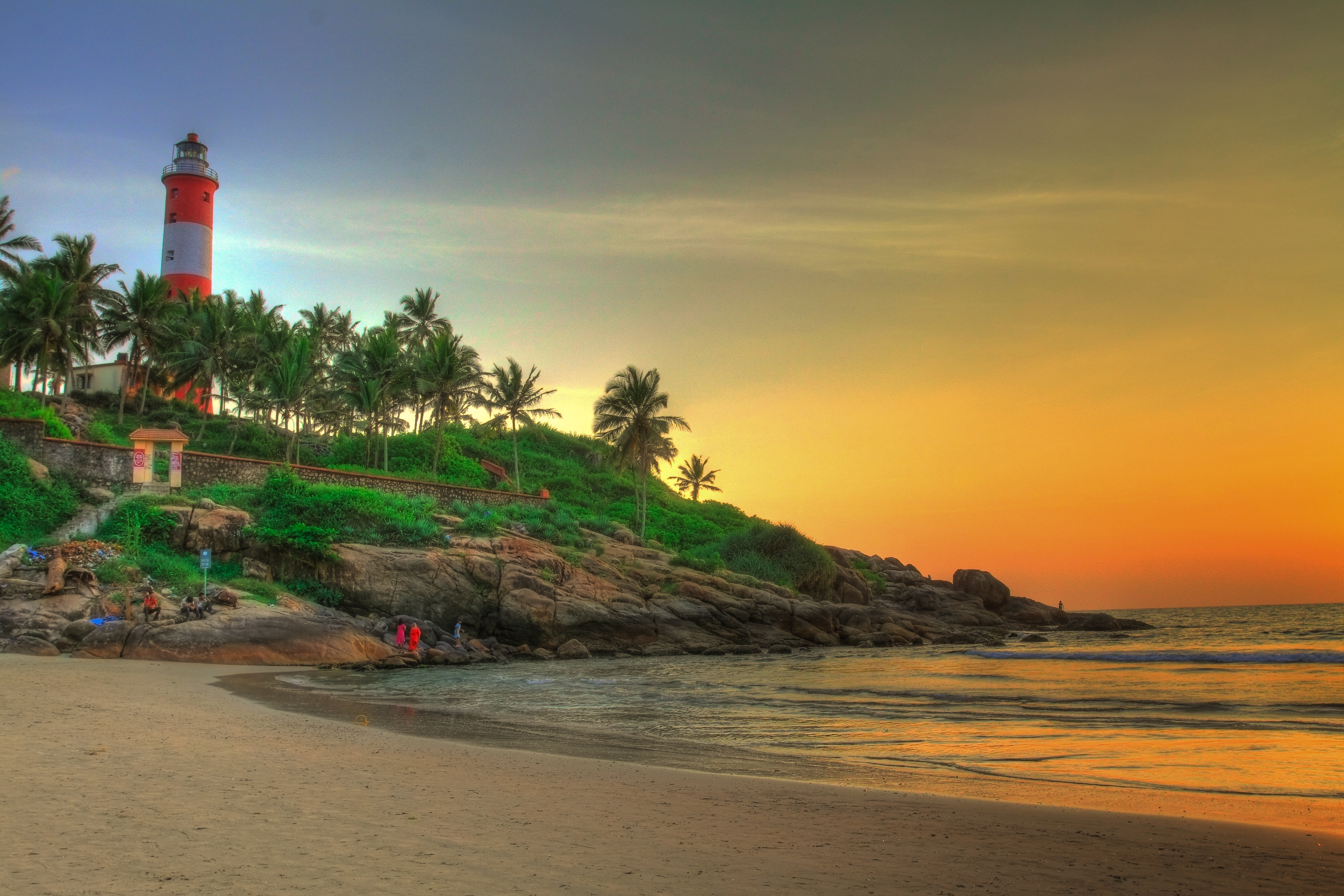
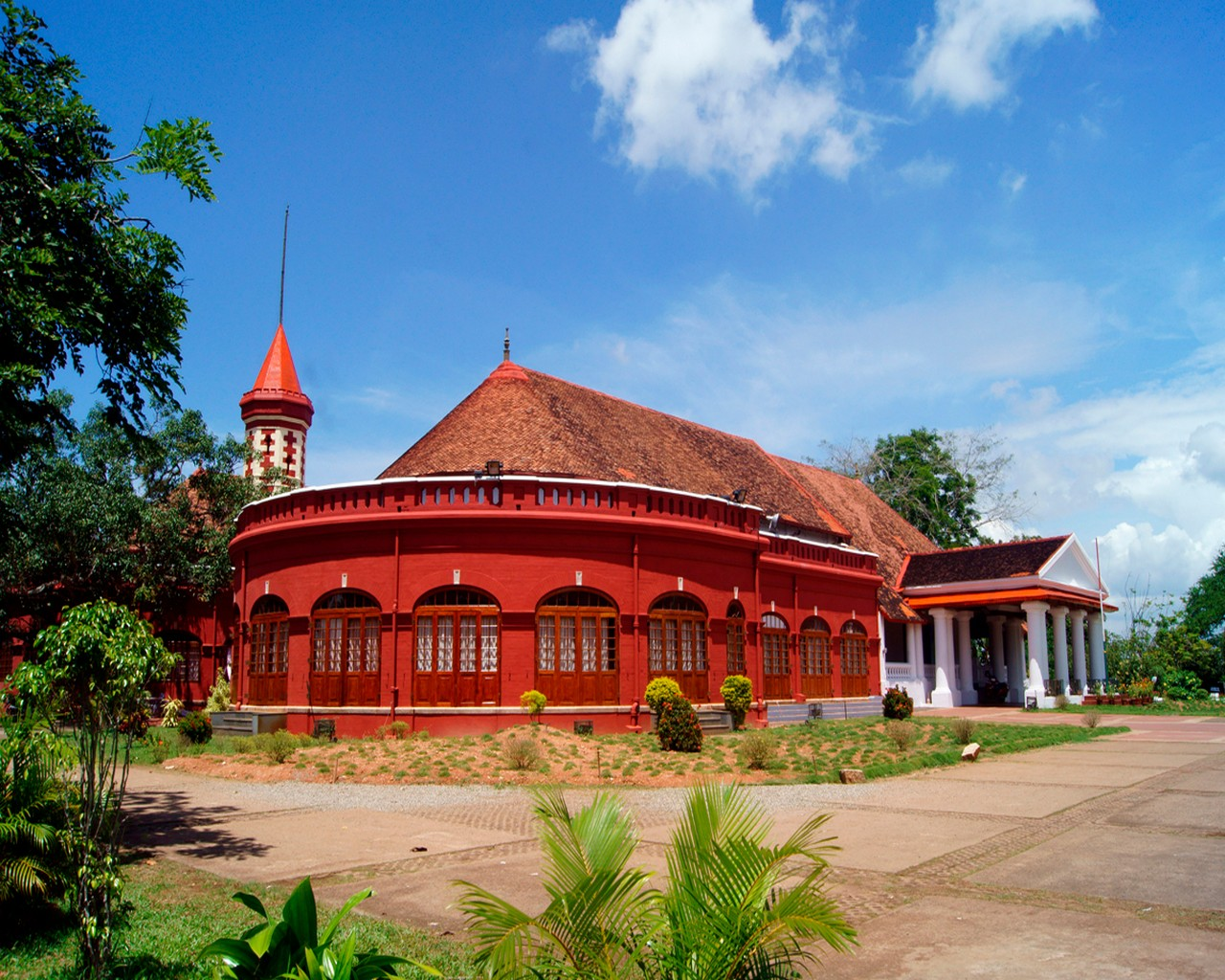
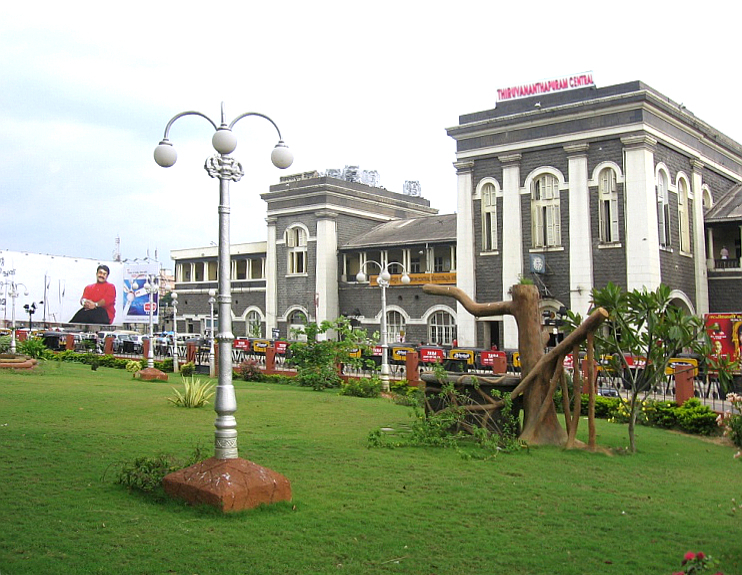
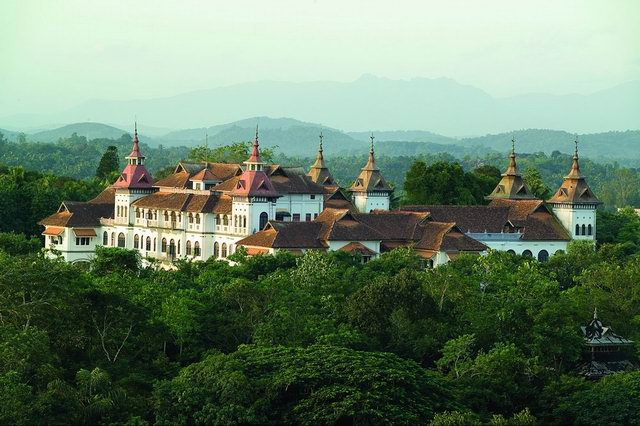
- Northern Thiruvananthapuram with the Technopark Phase 2 in the centre Padmanabhaswamy Temple Technopark Phase 3 Kovalam Beach Kanakakkunnu Palace Thiruvananthapuram Central Kowdiar Palace

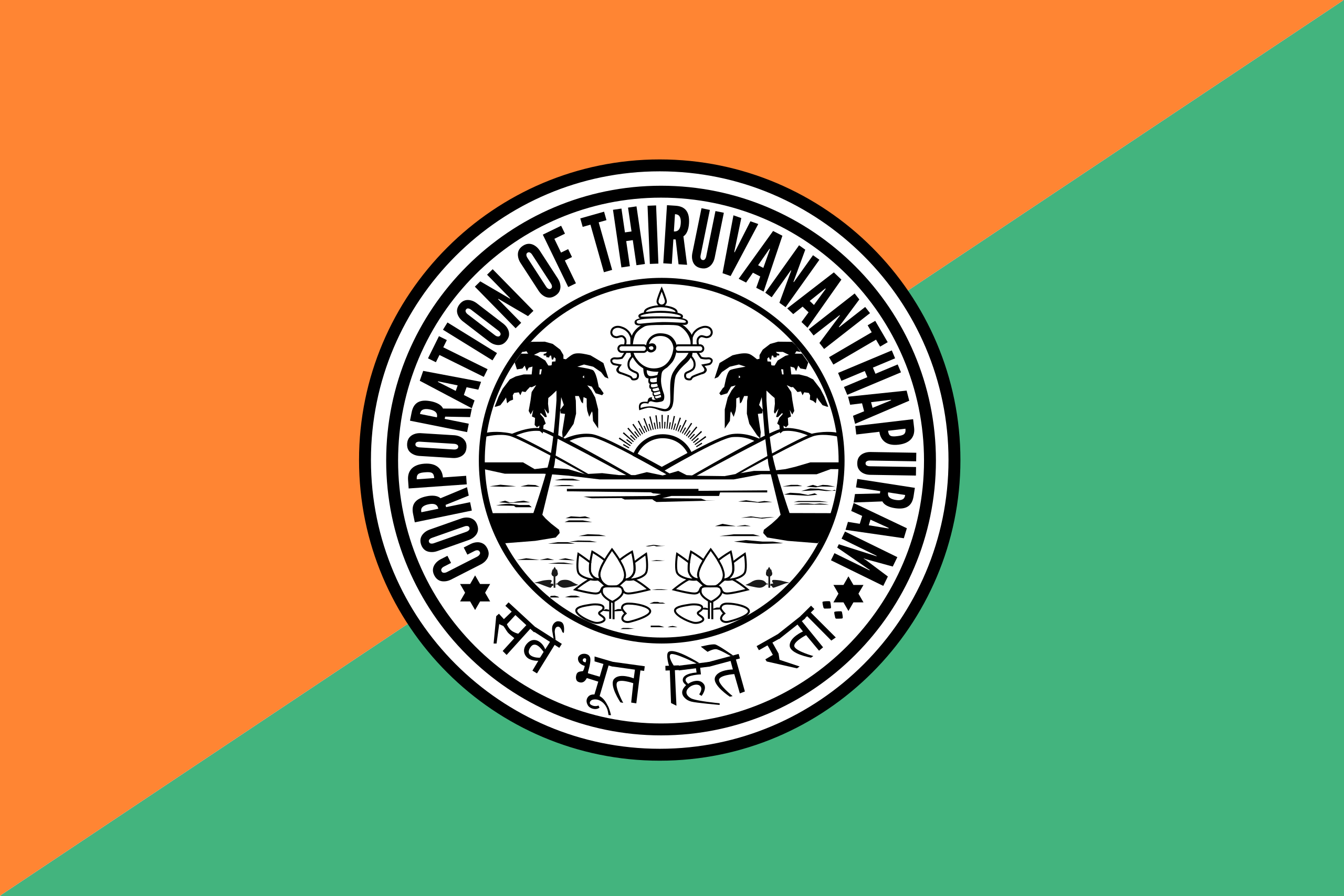
- Flag Seal
- Nicknames: Evergreen City of India; God's Own Capital
- Coordinates: 08°31′26.8″N 76°56′11.8″E
- Country: India
- State: Kerala
- District: Thiruvananthapuram
- Founder: Marthanda Varma

Government
  - Type: Municipal Corporation
  - Body: Thiruvananthapuram Municipal Corporation
  - Mayor: Adv V.V. Rajesh (BJP)
  - Deputy Mayor: G. S. Asha Nath (BJP)
  - Member of Parliament: Dr Shashi Tharoor (INC)

Area
  - Metropolis: 214 km^{2} (83 sq mi)
  - Metro: 311 km^{2} (120 sq mi)
  - Rank: 1st
- Elevation: 38.93 m (127.7 ft)

Population
  - Metropolis: 957,730
  - Density: 4,480/km^{2} (11,600/sq mi)
  - Metro: 1,890,406
- Demonym(s): Trivandrumite, Trivian
- Time zone: UTC+5:30 (IST)
- PIN: 695XXX
- Area code: +91 471-XXXXXXX
- Vehicle registration: KL-01 Thiruvananthapuram (Tvm South); KL-22 Kazhakootam (Tvm North); KL-15 KSRTC; KL-16 Attingal; KL-19 Parassala; KL-20 Neyyattinkara; KL-21 Nedumangad; KL-74 Kattakkada; KL-81 Varkala
- Common language: Malayalam, English
- Gross domestic product(2020): US$15.777 (equivalent to $19.63 in 2025)Billion
- International airport: Thiruvananthapuram International Airport
- International Seaport: Vizhinjam International Seaport Thiruvananthapuram
- Spaceport: Thumba Equatorial Rocket Launching Station
- Climate: Am/Aw (Köppen)
- Website: trivandrum.nic.in

Thiruvananthapuram (Malayalam pronunciation: [t̪iɾuʋənən̪d̪ɐˈbuɾəm] tirr-ROO-və-nun-Tə-poor-əm), also known as Trivandrum, is the capital city of the Indian state of Kerala. As of 2011, the Thiruvananthapuram Municipal Corporation had a population of 957,730 over an area of 214.86 km^{2}, making it the most populous city in Kerala. The larger Thiruvananthapuram metropolitan area has over 1.7 million inhabitants within an area of 543 km^{2}, making it the second-most populous metropolitan area in Kerala after Kochi.. Thiruvananthapuram is one of the few cities in India that serves as a state capital and is also centre for heritage, maritime activities, information technology, research and development, space research, defence, automotive technology, and biosciences. It is also among the few cities in the world where both an international airport and an international seaport are located within the city in close proximity to the city centre.

Located on the west coast of India near the extreme south of the mainland, Thiruvananthapuram is a port city located 10 nautical miles (19 km; 12 mi) from a heavily trafficked east–west shipping channel. The city is home to India's first deep-water trans-shipment port, owned by the Vizhinjam International Seaport Ltd. Thiruvananthapuram under the Government of Kerala. The city is characterised by its undulating terrain of low coastal hills. Thiruvananthapuram is also known for its cultural heritage, being associated with the musical contributions of Swathi Thirunal Rama Varma and the artistic legacy of painter Raja Ravi Varma. Thiruvananthapuram has contributed to the development of Malayalam literature through individuals like Ulloor S. Parameswara Iyer, Kumaran Asan, C. V. Raman Pillai and Narayana Guru. The city is also known for Sree Padmanabhaswamy Temple, known as the richest temple in the world. The other temples includes the Sreevaraham temple, the Shreekanteswaram temple and the Attukal Bhagavathy temple.

The present regions that constitute Thiruvananthapuram were ruled by the Ays who were related to feudatories of the Chera dynasty. In the 12th century, it was conquered by the Kingdom of Venad. In the 18th century, the king Marthanda Varma expanded the territory, founded the princely state of Travancore and made Thiruvananthapuram its capital. Travancore became the most dominant state in Kerala by defeating the powerful Zamorin of Calicut in the battle of Purakkad in 1755. Following India's independence in 1947, Thiruvananthapuram became the capital of Travancore–Cochin state and remained so until the new Indian state of Kerala was formed in 1956.

Thiruvananthapuram is a notable academic and research hub and home to the University of Kerala, APJ Abdul Kalam Technological University, the regional headquarters of Indira Gandhi National Open University, and many other schools and colleges. Thiruvananthapuram is also home to research centres such as the National Institute for Interdisciplinary Science and Technology, the Indian Space Research Organisation's Vikram Sarabhai Space Centre, the Indian Institute of Space Science and Technology, the National Centre for Earth Science Studies and a campus of the Indian Institutes of Science Education and Research. Thiruvananthapuram is where India's space programme began, with the headquarters of Liquid Propulsion Systems Centre located there. The city is home to media institutions like Toonz Animation India and Tata Elxsi Ltd, and also to Chitranjali Film Studio, one of the first film studios in Malayalam Cinema, and Kinfra Film and Video Park at Kazhakoottam, which is India's first infotainment industrial park.

In 2012, Thiruvananthapuram was named the best Kerala city to live in, by a field survey conducted by The Times of India. In 2013, the city was ranked the fifteenth best city to live in in India, in a survey conducted by India Today. Thiruvananthapuram was ranked the best Indian city for two consecutive years, 2015 and 2016, according to the Annual Survey of India's City-Systems (ASICS) conducted by the Janaagraha Centre for Citizenship and Democracy. The city was also selected as the best governed city in India in a survey conducted by Janaagraha Centre for citizenship and democracy in 2017.

== Etymology ==
The city takes its name from the Malayalam word thiru-anantha-puram (തിരുവനന്തപുരം [t̪iɾuʋɐnɐn̪d̪ɐpuɾɐm]), meaning "The City of Lord Anantha (means infinite, endless, or eternal)", referring to the deity of the Sri Padmanabhaswamy Temple located in the city. Thiruvananthapuram is also known in literature, and popular reference as Ananthapuri, derived from the Sanskrit word Syanandurapuram, meaning "The City of Bliss" in Carnatic kirtanas composed by Swathi Thirunal, erstwhile Maharaja of Travancore. The city was officially referred to as Trivandrum until 1991 (Trivandrum being the anglicised name of the town), when the government decided to reinstate the city's original name Thiruvananthapuram. Many Malayalees still refer to the city as Trivandrum, however. The city was also called as Anandapatnam or Anandapatam in Tamil and Telugu, meaning "The City of Ananda" which has the same meaning as the original name.

== History ==
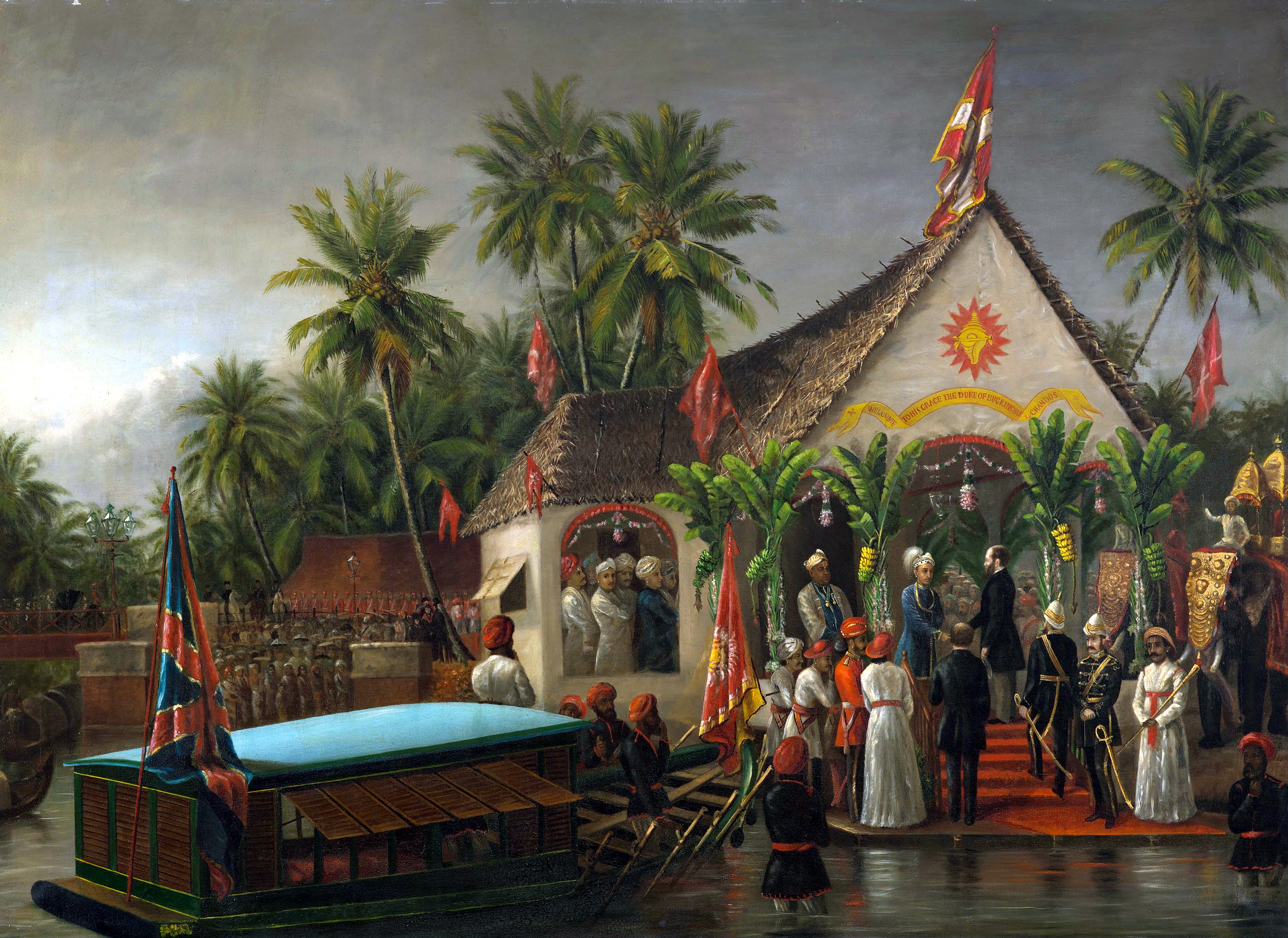
Painting by Raja Ravi Varma depicting Richard Temple-Grenville, 3rd Duke of Buckingham and Chandos being greeted by Visakham Thirunal, with Ayilyam Thirunal of Travancore looking on, during Buckingham's visit to Thiruvananthapuram in early 1880

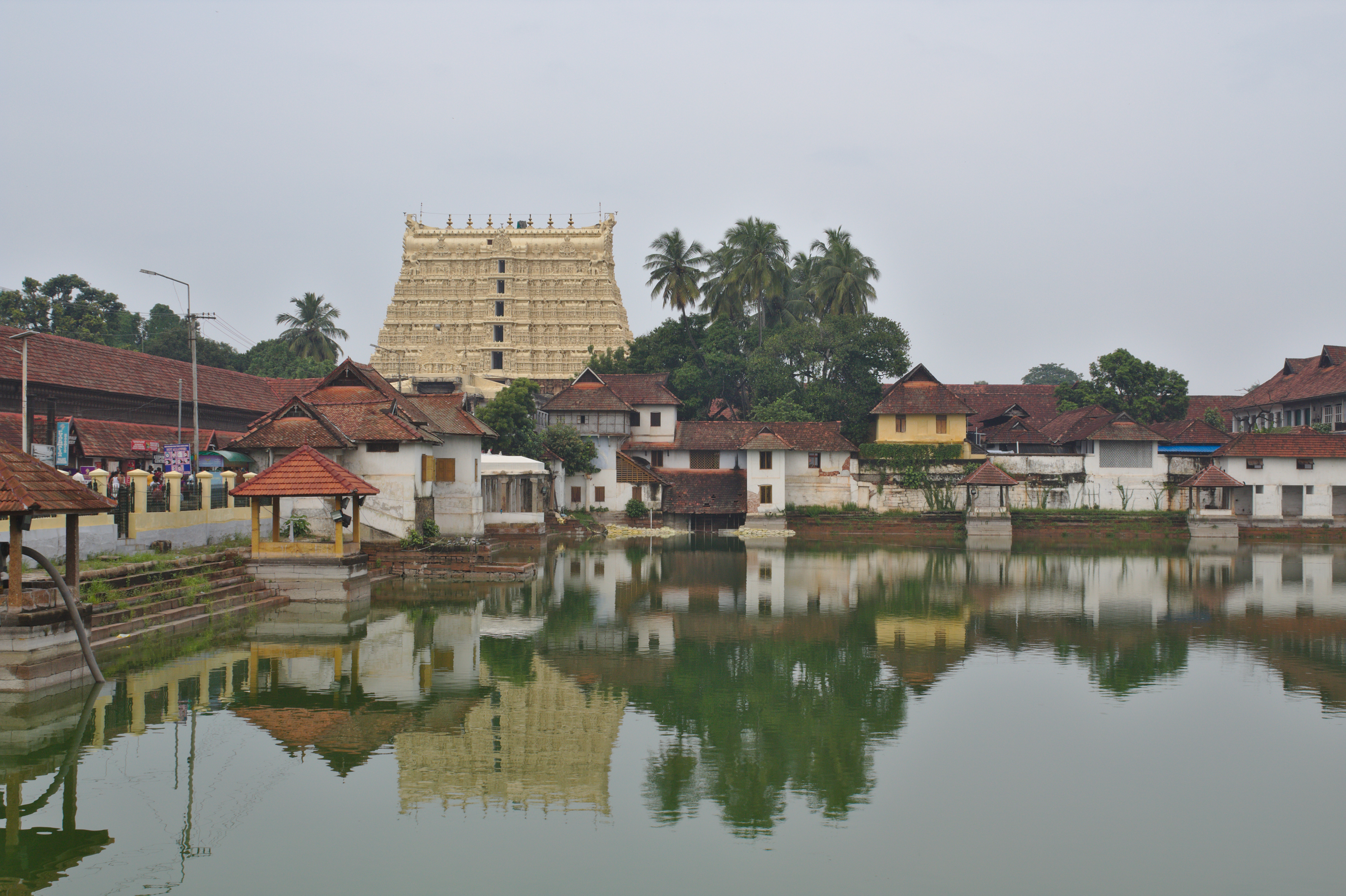
Padmanabhaswamy Temple is the richest temple in the world.

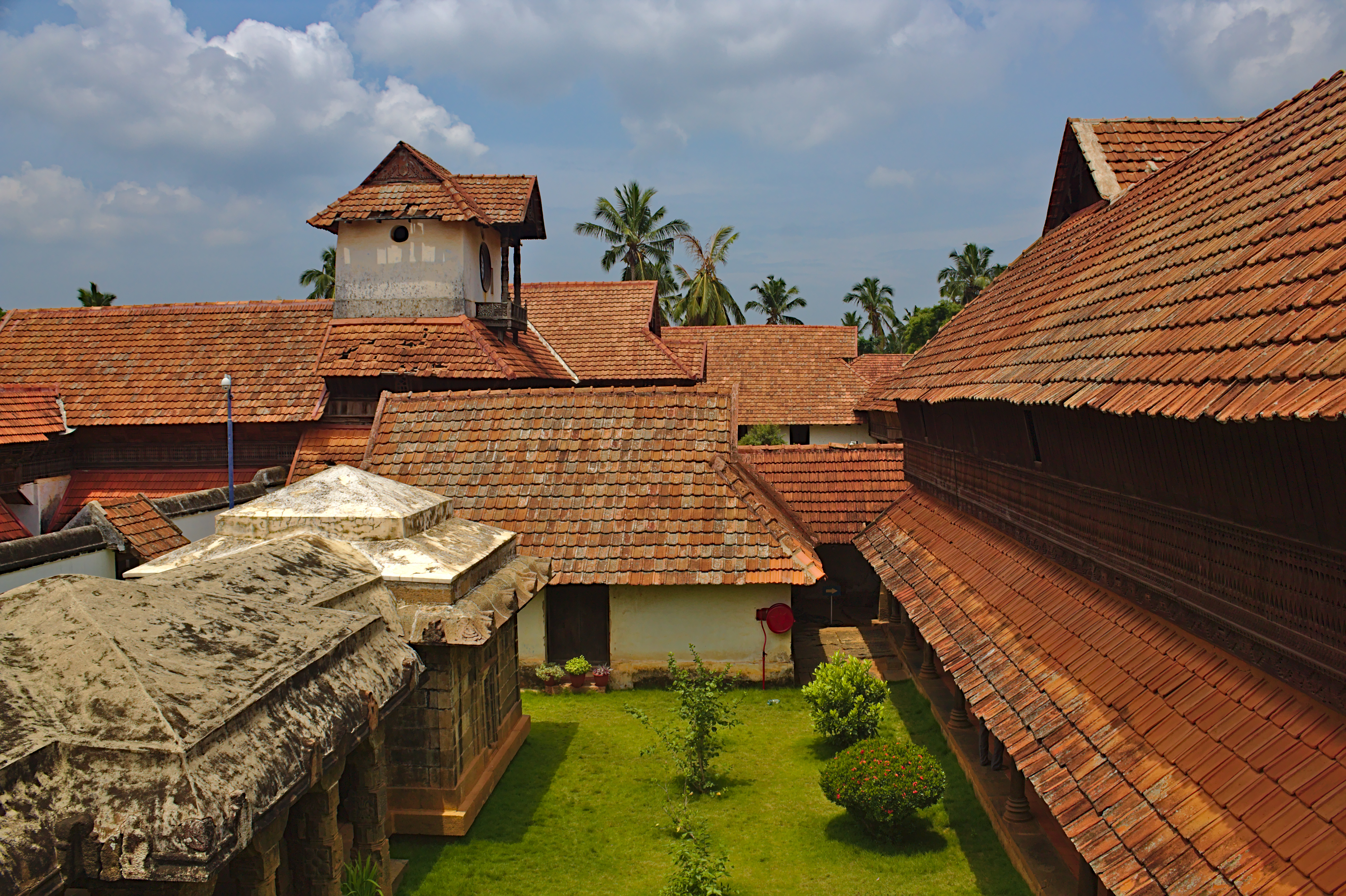
Padmanabhapuram Palace

=== Pre-historic period ===
Thiruvananthapuram is a relatively modern region with trading traditions dating back to 1000 BCE. It is believed that the ships of King Solomon landed in a port then called Ophir (now Poovar) in Thiruvananthapuram in 1036 BCE. The city was the trading post for spices, sandalwood and ivory. However, the ancient political and cultural history of the city was almost entirely independent from that of the rest of Kerala.

=== Ancient period ===
The southern region of present-day Kerala state (The coastal belt between Thiruvananthapuram and Alappuzha) was under the Ay dynasty, which was more related to the Pandya dynasty of Madurai. The early rulers of the city were the Ays. Vizhinjam, which is now a region in present-day Thiruvananthapuram, was the capital of the Ay dynasty. Vizhinjam was an important port city from as early as the second century BC. During the Ay dynasty's rule, Thiruvananthapuram witnessed many battles in which the Chola and Pandyan dynasties attempted to capture the port town.

=== Middle Ages ===
After the death of king Vikramaditya Varaguna in 925 AD, the glory of the Ays departed and almost all their territories became part of the Chera dynasty. During the tenth century, the Cholas attacked and sacked Vizhinjam and surrounding regions. The port in Vizhinjam and the historic education centre of Kanthalloor Sala were also destroyed by Cholas during this period. A branch of the Ay family, which had controlled the Padmanabhaswamy Temple, merged with the Kingdom of Venad in the 12th century.

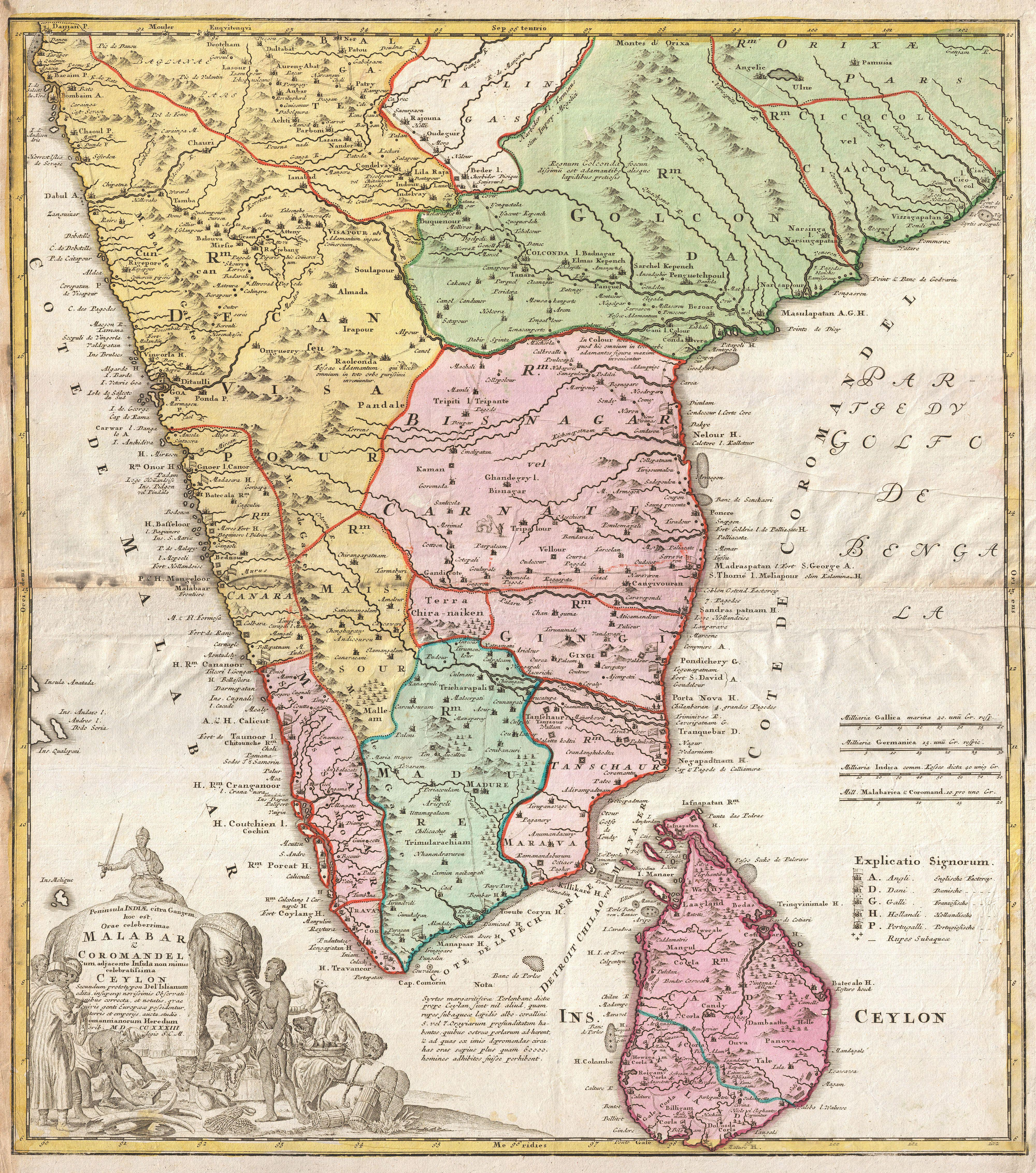
A map of Malabar Coast drawn by Homann Heirs in 1733. At that time, Travancore was only a small territory wedged between Kollam and Kanyakumari, as shown in the map (Present-day districts of Thiruvananthapuram and Kanyakumari only).

=== Early Modern period ===
It was in the later half of the 18th century, that Travancore inherited the kingdoms up to Cochin and became a powerful kingdom, and Thiruvananthapuram became a major city of Kerala. Present-day Thiruvananthapuram city, district, and Kanyakumari district, were parts of the Ay dynasty during ancient and mediaeval ages, in the southernmost part of the Indian subcontinent. The Ay kingdom had experienced attacks and conquests by Cholas and Pandyas in various periods. Later it became a part of Venad in late Middle Ages, which was eventually expanded as the powerful kingdom of Travancore in the 18th century CE. The Tamil-Dravidian kind of architecture is also found in Padmanabhaswamy temple, which makes it distinct and unique from the architectural style of temples in northern and central parts of Kerala.

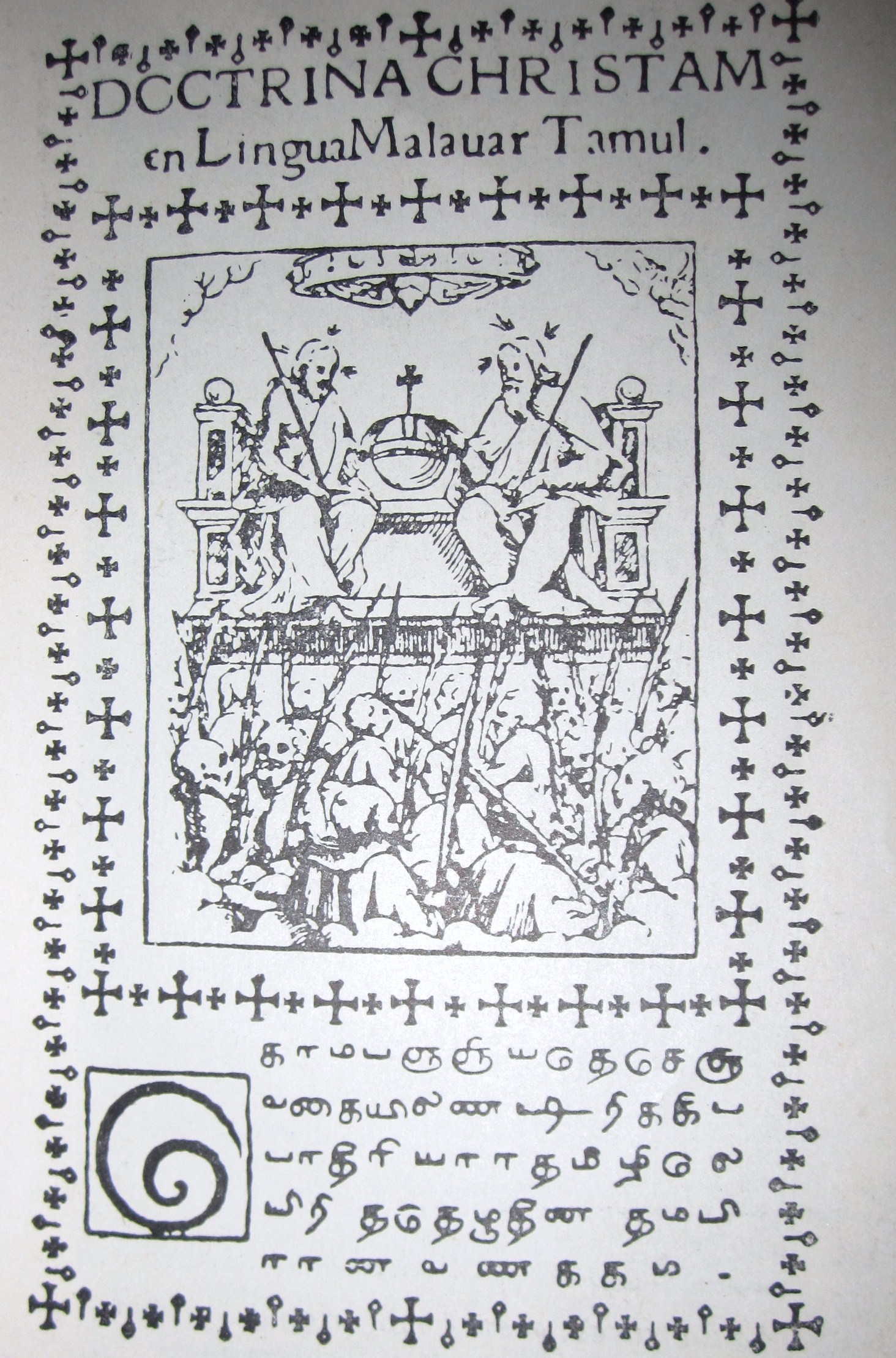
Thambiran Vanakkam was printed at Kollam, the capital of Venad in 1578, during the Portuguese Era. It holds the record of the first book printed in any Indian language. It was written in the language Lingua Malabar Tamul which was spoken in Kerala during the medieval period.

=== Late Modern period ===
In the early 18th century CE, the Travancore royal family adopted some members from the royal family of Kolathunadu based at Kannur. Then, Marthanda Varma who inherited the Kingdom of Venad expanded the kingdom by conquering the kingdoms of Kayamkulam, Kottarakkara, Kottayam, Changanassery, Meenachil, Poonjar and Ambalappuzha. In 1729, Marthanda Varma founded the princely state of Thiruvithamkoor and Thiruvananthapuram was made the capital in 1795 after shifting the capital from Padmanabhapuram in Kanyakumari district. Thiruvananthapuram became a prominent city in Kerala under Marthanda Varma.

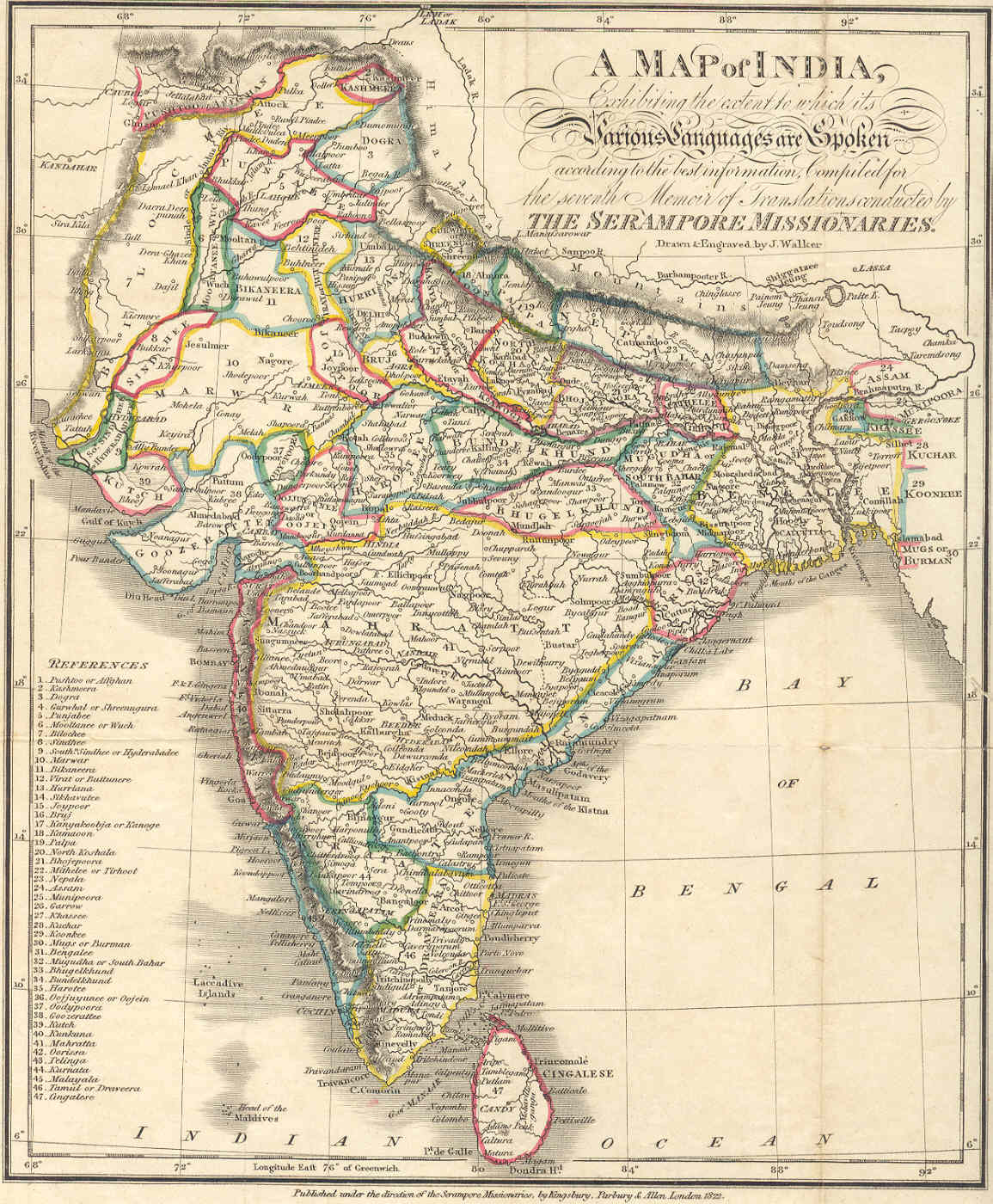
A language map of India prepared in 1822.

As a result of the annexation of neighbouring chiefdoms, the artists and scholars from these places migrated to Thiruvananthapuram, turning it into a cultural centre. Marthanda Varma gave patronage to different temple art forms including Koothu, Padhakam, Kathakali, Thullal, and Koodiyattam. Noted artists such as Ramapurathu Warrier and Kunchan Nambiar amongst others served as his court poets. Travancore became the most dominant state in Kerala by defeating the powerful Zamorin of Kozhikode in the battle of Purakkad in 1755.

The city developed into a significant intellectual and artistic centre during this period. The city's golden age was during the mid-19th century under the reign of Maharaja Swathi Thirunal and Maharaja Ayilyam Thirunal. This era saw the establishment of the first English school (1834), the Observatory (1837), the General Hospital (1839), the Oriental Research Institute & Manuscripts Library and the University College (1873). The first mental hospital in the state was started during the same period. Sanskrit College, Ayurveda College, Law College and a second-grade college for women were started by Moolam Thirunal (1885–1924).

=== Contemporary period ===
The early 20th century was an age of tremendous political and social changes in the city. The Sree Moolam Popular Assembly, established in 1904, was the first democratically elected legislative council in any Indian state. Despite not being under the direct control of the British Empire at any time, the city featured prominently in India's freedom struggle. The Indian National Congress had a very active presence in Thiruvananthapuram. A meeting of the Indian National Congress presided by Dr Pattabhi Sitaramaiah was held here in 1938.

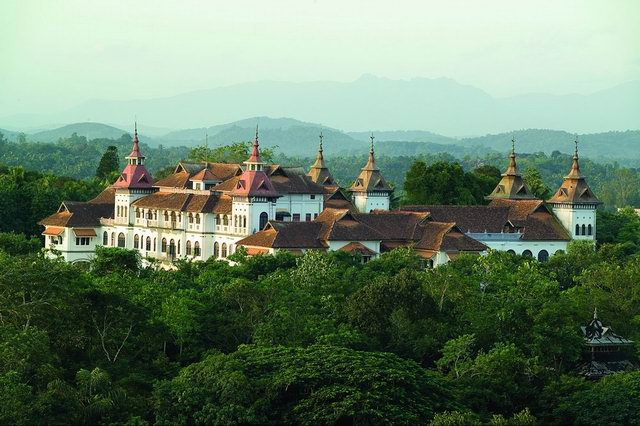
Kowdiar Palace built-in 1915 was the official residence of the Travancore Royal Family.

The Thiruvananthapuram Municipality came into existence in 1920 as the first municipality in the Travancore region. The municipality was converted into a corporation on 30 October 1940, during the period of Chitra Thirunal Bala Rama Varma, who had taken over in 1931. The city witnessed multi-faceted progress during his period. The promulgation of the "Temple Entry Proclamation" (1936) was an act that underlined social emancipation. This era also saw the establishment of the University of Travancore in 1937, which later became Kerala University.

=== Modern period ===
With the end of British rule in 1947, Travancore chose to join the Indian union. The first popularly elected ministry, headed by Pattom Thanu Pillai, was installed in office on 24 March 1948. In 1949, Thiruvananthapuram became the capital of Thiru-Kochi, the state formed by the integration of Travancore with its northern neighbour, the Kochi. The king of Travancore, Chitra Thirunal Bala Rama Varma, became the Rajpramukh of the Travancore-Cochin Union from 1 July 1949 until 31 October 1956. When the state of Kerala was formed on 1 November 1956, Thiruvananthapuram became its capital.

With the establishment of Thumba Equatorial Rocket Launching Station (TERLS) in 1962, Thiruvananthapuram became the cradle of India's ambitious space programme. The first Indian space rocket was developed and launched from the Vikram Sarabhai Space Centre (VSSC) on the outskirts of the city in 1963. Several establishments of the Indian Space Research Organisation (ISRO) were later established in Thiruvananthapuram.

A significant milestone in the city's recent history was the establishment of Technopark—India's first IT park—in 1995. Technopark has developed into the largest IT park in the geographical area, employing around 62,000 people in 450 companies.

== Geography ==
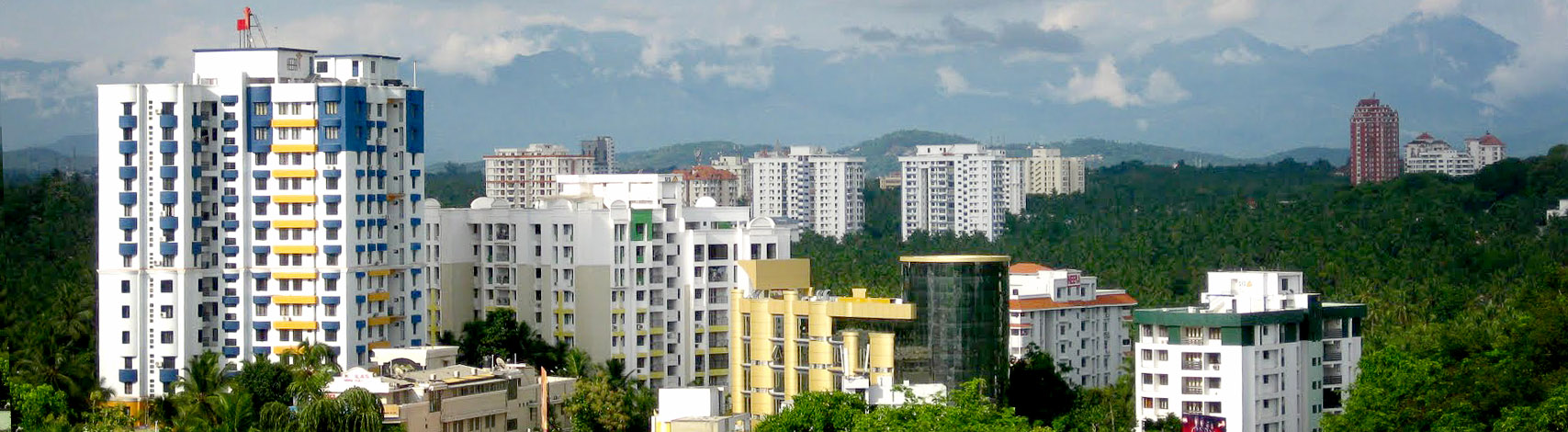
View of Pattom, the northeastern part of the city. The Western Ghats mountain range is seen in the background

Thiruvananthapuram is built on seven hills by the seashore and is at 8.5°N 76.9°E on the west coast, near the southern tip of mainland India. The city is on the west coast of India and is bounded by the Laccadive Sea to its west and the Western Ghats to its east. The average elevation of the city is 16 ft (4.9 m) above sea level. The Geological Survey of India has identified Thiruvananthapuram as a moderately earthquake-prone urban centre and categorised the metropolis in the Seismic III Zone. Thiruvananthapuram lies on the shores of the Karamana and Killi rivers. Vellayani, Thiruvalla and Aakulam backwaters lie in the city. The soil type in the middle part of the city is a dark brown loamy laterite soil high in phosphates. Laterisation is a result of the heavy rainfall and humid conditions. In western coastal regions of the city, sandy loam soil is found, and on hilly eastern parts of the district, rich dark brown loam of granite origin is found.

The Thiruvananthapuram Corporation is spread over 214.86 km^{2} (82.96 sq mi). The wider Thiruvananthapuram metropolitan area comprises Thiruvananthapuram corporation, three municipalities and 27 panchayats, as of 2011. Being the largest city in India's southern tip region, it is essential for both military logistics and civil aviation in the southern part of the country. Thiruvananthapuram is the headquarters of the Southern Air Command (SAC) of the Indian Air Force.

=== Climate ===
The city has a climate that lies on the border between a tropical savanna climate (Köppen Aw) and a tropical monsoon climate (Am). As a result, its only distinct seasons relate to rainfall rather than temperature. Temperatures in Thiruvananthapuram remain remarkably stable throughout the year, with an annual mean maximum of about 31–32 °C (88–90 °F) and a mean minimum around 23–24 °C (73–75 °F). Daytime highs generally stay between 30 and 34 °C (86–93 °F), while nights are warm and humid, averaging approximately 22–25 °C (72–77 °F). The temperature rarely falls below something like both 20 °C (68 °F) and above 35 °C (95 °F). The humidity is high and rises to about 90% during the monsoon season. Thiruvananthapuram is the first city along the path of the south-west monsoons and gets its first showers in early June. The city receives heavy rainfall of around 1,835 mm (72.2 in) per year. The city also gets rain from the receding north-east monsoons which hit the city by October. The dry season sets in by December. The lowest temperature recorded in the city core was 10.8 °C (51.4 °F) on 6 January 1974 and it also recorded 15.6 °C in Jan 18 in 2015. The highest temperature was 38.2 °C (100.8 °F) on 21 February 2019. At the airport, the lowest temperature recorded was 12.1 °C (53.8 °F) on 15 January 1975 and the highest temperature was 36.3 °C (97.3 °F) on 5 May 1998.

Climate data for Thiruvananthapuram City (1991–2020, extremes 1901–2020)
Month	Jan	Feb	Mar	Apr	May	Jun	Jul	Aug	Sep	Oct	Nov	Dec	Year
Record high °C (°F)	36.2 (97.2)	38.2 (100.8)	37.7 (99.9)	38.0 (100.4)	36.7 (98.1)	35.8 (96.4)	34.0 (93.2)	34.6 (94.3)	35.4 (95.7)	35.2 (95.4)	34.8 (94.6)	36.2 (97.2)	38.2 (100.8)
Mean maximum °C (°F)	34.4 (93.9)	34.8 (94.6)	35.4 (95.7)	35.1 (95.2)	34.6 (94.3)	32.8 (91.0)	32.1 (89.8)	32.3 (90.1)	33.0 (91.4)	32.8 (91.0)	33.1 (91.6)	34.1 (93.4)	35.9 (96.6)
Mean daily maximum °C (°F)	32.4 (90.3)	32.8 (91.0)	33.5 (92.3)	33.3 (91.9)	32.6 (90.7)	30.4 (86.7)	30.1 (86.2)	30.3 (86.5)	30.9 (87.6)	30.9 (87.6)	31.0 (87.8)	32.0 (89.6)	31.7 (89.1)
Daily mean °C (°F)	27.5 (81.5)	28.2 (82.8)	29.2 (84.6)	29.5 (85.1)	29.0 (84.2)	27.5 (81.5)	27.0 (80.6)	27.2 (81.0)	27.5 (81.5)	27.4 (81.3)	27.3 (81.1)	27.5 (81.5)	27.9 (82.2)
Mean daily minimum °C (°F)	22.3 (72.1)	22.9 (73.2)	24.3 (75.7)	25.1 (77.2)	25.1 (77.2)	23.8 (74.8)	23.3 (73.9)	23.4 (74.1)	23.5 (74.3)	23.5 (74.3)	23.2 (73.8)	22.6 (72.7)	23.6 (74.5)
Mean minimum °C (°F)	23.3 (73.9)	23.6 (74.5)	24.3 (75.7)	25.1 (77.2)	25.1 (77.2)	23.8 (74.8)	23.3 (73.9)	23.4 (74.1)	23.5 (74.3)	23.5 (74.3)	23.2 (73.8)	22.6 (72.7)	23.6 (74.5)
Record low °C (°F)	10.8 (51.4)	18.1 (64.6)	20.2 (68.4)	20.0 (68.0)	20.1 (68.2)	20.0 (68.0)	20.2 (68.4)	18.2 (64.8)	20.8 (69.4)	20.1 (68.2)	18.9 (66.0)	18.2 (64.8)	10.8 (51.4)
Average rainfall mm (inches)	17.9 (0.70)	21.7 (0.85)	30.6 (1.20)	122.3 (4.81)	213.8 (8.42)	307.8 (12.12)	185.2 (7.29)	161.0 (6.34)	196.7 (7.74)	297.2 (11.70)	212.8 (8.38)	68.4 (2.69)	1,835.3 (72.26)
Average rainy days	0.9	1.4	2.2	6.9	9.1	16.0	13.3	9.9	10.4	13.0	9.8	4.0	96.9
Average relative humidity (%) (at 17:30 IST)	64	63	66	73	75	80	79	77	77	80	78	69	73
Average dew point °C (°F)	21 (70)	22 (72)	23 (73)	24 (75)	24 (75)	24 (75)	24 (75)	24 (75)	24 (75)	24 (75)	24 (75)	23 (73)	23 (74)
Mean monthly sunshine hours	260.4	248.6	254.2	201.0	192.2	129.0	136.4	164.3	180.0	173.6	165.0	217.0	2,321.7
Mean daily sunshine hours	8.4	8.8	8.2	6.7	6.2	4.3	4.4	5.3	6.0	5.6	5.5	7.0	6.4
Average ultraviolet index	11	12	12	12	12	12	12	12	12	12	11	10	12
Source 1: India Meteorological Department (sun 1971–2000) Time and Date (dewpoints, 2005-2015)
Source 2: Tokyo Climate Center (mean temperatures 1991–2020) Weather Atlas

Climate data for Thiruvananthapuram Airport (1991–2020)
Month	Jan	Feb	Mar	Apr	May	Jun	Jul	Aug	Sep	Oct	Nov	Dec	Year
Record high °C (°F)	35.5 (95.9)	35.6 (96.1)	36.2 (97.2)	36.1 (97.0)	36.3 (97.3)	35.2 (95.4)	33.9 (93.0)	33.7 (92.7)	33.7 (92.7)	35.7 (96.3)	34.4 (93.9)	34.4 (93.9)	36.3 (97.3)
Mean daily maximum °C (°F)	31.4 (88.5)	32.0 (89.6)	32.8 (91.0)	33.2 (91.8)	32.5 (90.5)	30.7 (87.3)	30.1 (86.2)	30.1 (86.2)	30.5 (86.9)	30.7 (87.3)	30.9 (87.6)	31.3 (88.3)	31.3 (88.3)
Mean daily minimum °C (°F)	22.6 (72.7)	23.4 (74.1)	24.7 (76.5)	25.7 (78.3)	25.5 (77.9)	24.4 (75.9)	23.8 (74.8)	24.0 (75.2)	24.0 (75.2)	24.0 (75.2)	23.8 (74.8)	23.1 (73.6)	24.1 (75.4)
Record low °C (°F)	10.8 (51.4)	16.0 (60.8)	19.0 (66.2)	20.7 (69.3)	20.7 (69.3)	19.5 (67.1)	20.8 (69.4)	20.5 (68.9)	20.1 (68.2)	19.4 (66.9)	18.8 (65.8)	17.9 (64.2)	10.8 (51.4)
Average rainfall mm (inches)	18.1 (0.71)	25.2 (0.99)	28.5 (1.12)	97.4 (3.83)	225.0 (8.86)	300.3 (11.82)	180.8 (7.12)	163.4 (6.43)	195.3 (7.69)	277.0 (10.91)	227.3 (8.95)	67.9 (2.67)	1,806.3 (71.11)
Average rainy days	0.9	1.5	1.7	6.1	9.1	15.8	12.7	9.5	9.7	12.3	10.1	3.7	93.0
Average relative humidity (%) (at 17:30 IST)	64	64	67	71	74	80	80	80	79	79	76	69	74
Source: India Meteorological Department

== Demographics ==
Others include Sikhism, Buddhism & Other religions (0.06%)

Religion in Thiruvananthapuram City (2011)
Religion	Percent
Hinduism	68.51%
Christianity	16.79%
Islam	13.77%
Not stated	0.85%
Others	0.09%

According to provisional results of the 2011 national census, the Corporation of Thiruvananthapuram, which occupies an area of 214 km^{2} (83 sq mi), had a population of 957,730. The city's population density was 4,454/km^{2} (11,540/sq mi). The Urban Agglomeration had a population of 1,687,406 in 2011. The sex ratio is 1,040 females for every 1,000 males, which is higher than the national average. Thiruvananthapuram's literacy rate of 93.72% exceeds the all-India average of 74%.

It is a historical city where Malayali form the vast majority of Thiruvananthapuram's population. There are also minorities like the Tamils and North Indians residing here. According to the 2011 census, 68.5% of the population is Hindu, 16.7% Christians and 13.7% Muslims. The remainder of the community includes Jains, Jews, Sikhs, Buddhists and other religions which account for 0.06% of the population; 0.85% did not state a belief in the census.

Malayalam, the official state language, is the dominant language in Thiruvananthapuram City: English is also used, mainly by the white-collar workforce. Tamil has the most speakers after Malayalam. The city also has a few Tulu, Kannada, Konkani, Dhivehi, Telugu and Hindi speakers. As per the 2001 census, the population below the poverty line in the city was 11,667.

Thiruvananthapuram has witnessed massive immigration of workers from northern India, mainly Punjab, Haryana, and Madhya Pradesh, and Eastern India, mainly West Bengal and Bihar, and from neighbouring countries like Sri Lanka, the Maldives, Nepal and Bangladesh.

== Administration ==
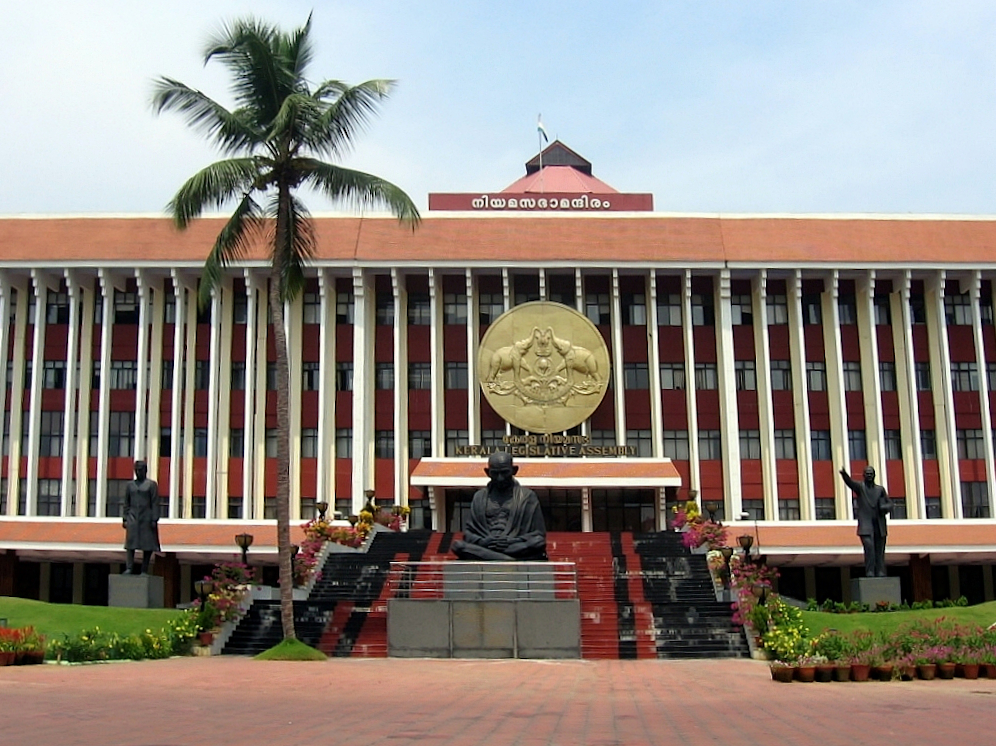
Kerala Legislative Assembly Building

The Corporation of Thiruvananthapuram or TMC oversees and manages the civic infrastructure of the city's 100 wards. Each ward elects a councillor to the Corporation of Thiruvananthapuram. TMC has the power to act as the local government of the city. TMC is headed by the Mayor, who is elected from among the councillors. The Mayor is responsible for the overall supervision and control of the administrative functions of the TMC. The corporation discharges its services through standing committees. The corporation secretary is an officer appointed by the government, who serves as the administrative head of the TMC and implements the council's decisions based on the resolutions adopted by the council. The functions of the Municipal Corporation are managed by seven departments—engineering, health, general administration, council, accounts and revenue. For the decentralised role of TMC, eleven Zonal Offices are created. The zonal offices are in Fort, Kadakampally, Nemom, Ulloor, Attipra, Thiruvallom, Kazhakkuttom, Sreekaryam, Kudappanakunnu, Vattiyoorkavu and Vizhinjam. The functions of the TMC include water supply, drainage and sewerage, sanitation, solid-waste management, and building regulation. The Thiruvananthapuram Development Authority is responsible for the statutory planning and development of the greater Thiruvananthapuram region.

As the seat of the Government of Kerala, Thiruvananthapuram is home to not only the offices of the local governing agencies but also the Kerala Legislative Assembly and the state secretariat, which is housed in the Kerala Government Secretariat complex. Thiruvananthapuram has two parliamentary constituencies—Attingal and Thiruvananthapuram—and elects five Members of the Legislative Assembly (MLAs) to the state legislature.

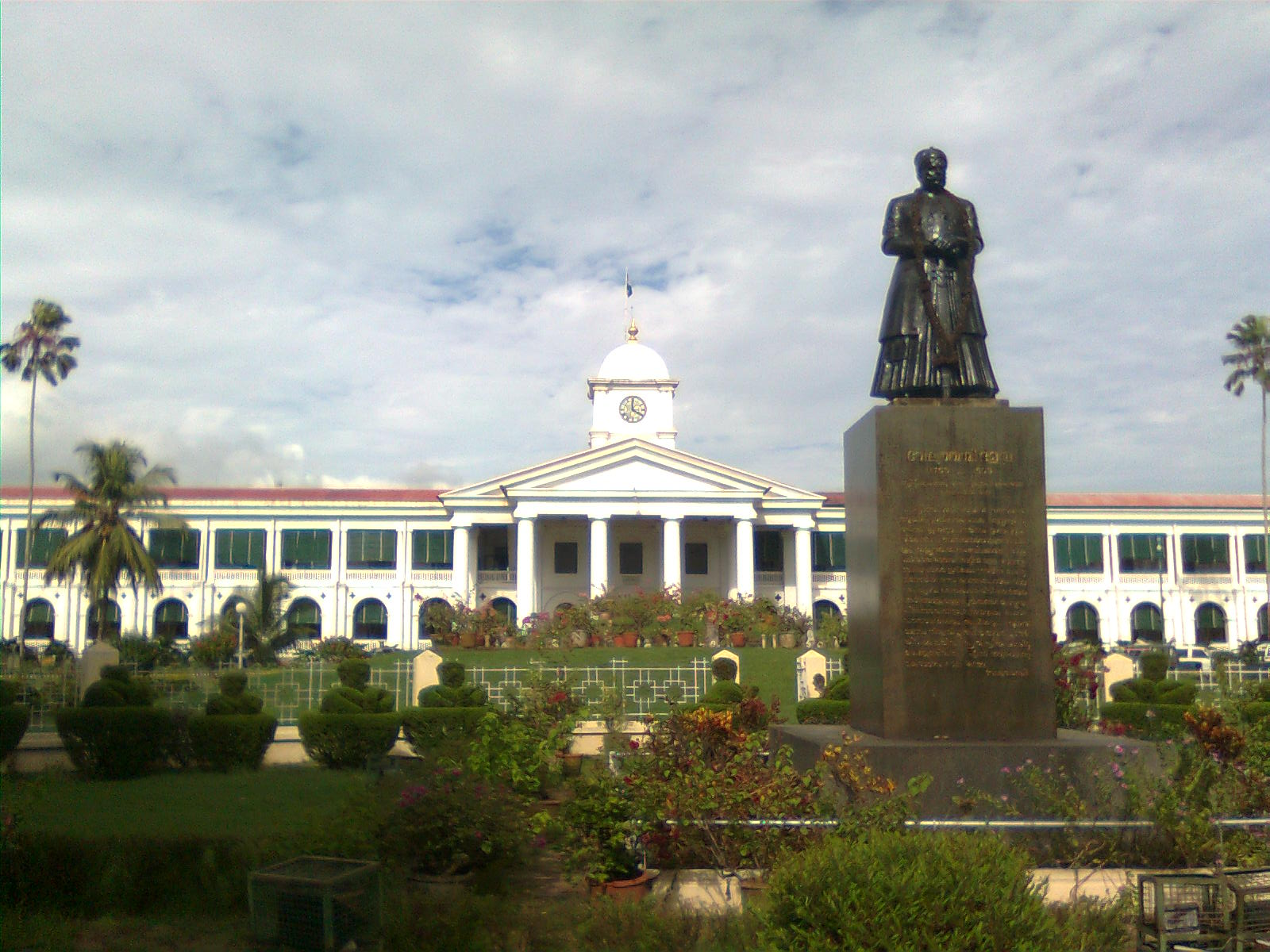
The Kerala Government Secretariat is the seat of administration of the Government of Kerala

=== Municipal finance ===
According to financial data published on the CityFinance Portal of the Ministry of Housing and Urban Affairs, the Thiruvananthapuram Municipal Corporation reported total revenue receipts of ₹713 crore (US$86 million) and total expenditure of ₹586 crore (US$71 million) in 2022–23. Tax revenue accounted for about 23.6% of the total revenue, while the corporation received ₹476 crore in grants during the financial year.

=== Law and order ===
The Thiruvananthapuram City Police is the main law-enforcement agency in the city. It is headed by a commissioner of police. The Thiruvananthapuram city police is a division of the Kerala Police, and the administrative control lies with the Kerala Home Ministry. The Thiruvananthapuram city police is the largest police division in Kerala, and it consists of four subdivisional offices and 24 police stations and a sanctioned strength of 3,500 police personnel. The Central Prison is the oldest prison in Kerala and the headquarters of Kerala Prisons and Correctional Services.

=== Military and diplomatic establishments ===
The Southern Air Command of the Indian Air Force is headquartered in the city. There are two state armed police battalions and a unit of the Central Reserve Police Force (CRPF) based in Thiruvananthapuram. The CRPF has a Group Headquarters (GHQ) located at Pallipuram. In addition to this, three units of the Central Industrial Security Force (CISF) and Sector Headquarters (SHQ) of the Border Security Force (BSF) are also present. Thiruvananthapuram also houses a large army cantonment in Pangode which houses some regiments of the Indian Army.

In the city there are a Consulate of the United Arab Emirates, a Consulate of the Maldives, and Honorary Consulates of Sri Lanka, Russia and Germany.

=== Utility services ===
The Kerala Water Authority supplies the city with water that is sourced from the Karamana River; most of it is drawn from the Aruvikkara and Peppara reservoirs, and it is treated and purified at the Aruvikkara pumping stations. The Wellington Water Works, commissioned in 1933, is one of the oldest city water supply schemes in India. The sewage water is treated at Muttathara sewage-treatment plant, which handles 32 million litres per day. The city area is divided into seven blocks for the execution of the sewage system. Electricity is supplied by the Kerala State Electricity Board. Fire services are handled by the Kerala Fire And Rescue Services.

== Economy ==
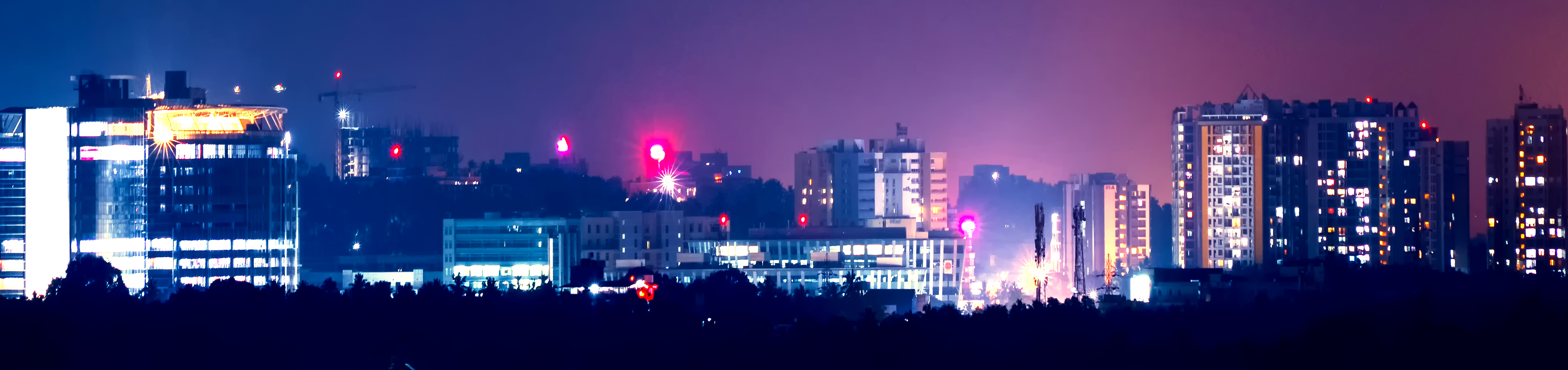
View of Technovalley, in the northwestern part of the city at night.

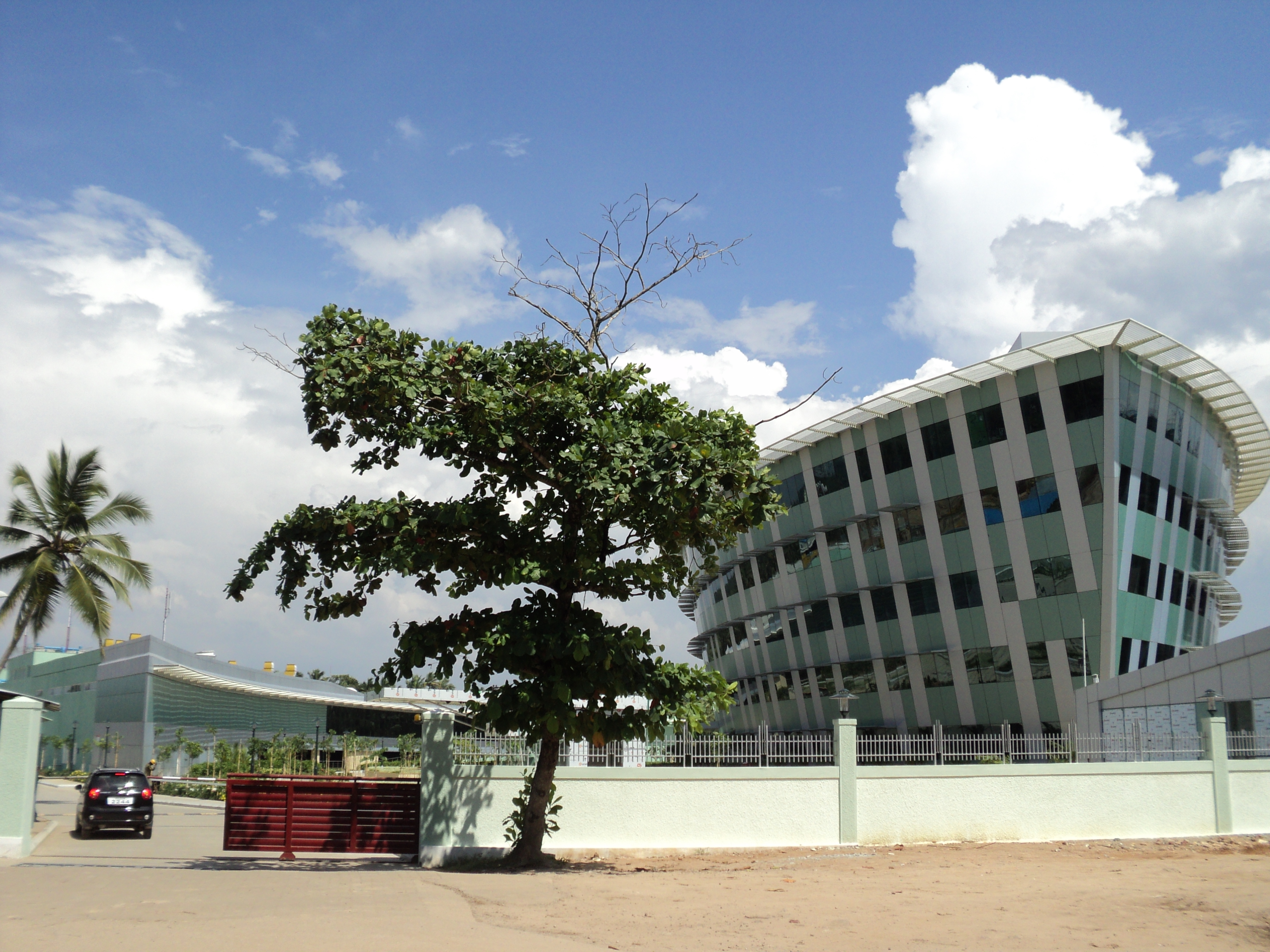
A part of Infosys campus. Thiruvananthapuram is a major IT hub in India.

Thiruvananthapuram is strategically located just 10 nautical miles (19 km; 12 mi) away from the crucial Suez to Singapore Far East international shipping route, placing it in close proximity to key global maritime traffic. This advantageous location, combined with the availability of reliable electricity, fresh water, and a long coastline, has accelerated industrial growth in the city. Thiruvananthapuram's economy comprises Information Technology, education, plantations, aerospace, commerce and tourism. Thiruvananthapuram district contributes 10.31%, of the state's GDP. With an economic growth rate of 13.83%, Thiruvananthapuram is the fastest-growing district in Kerala. Thiruvananthapuram was listed as one of the top-ten cities in India on Vibrancy and Consumption Index by a study conducted by global financial services firm Morgan Stanley. State- and central-government employees make up a large percentage of the city's workforce.

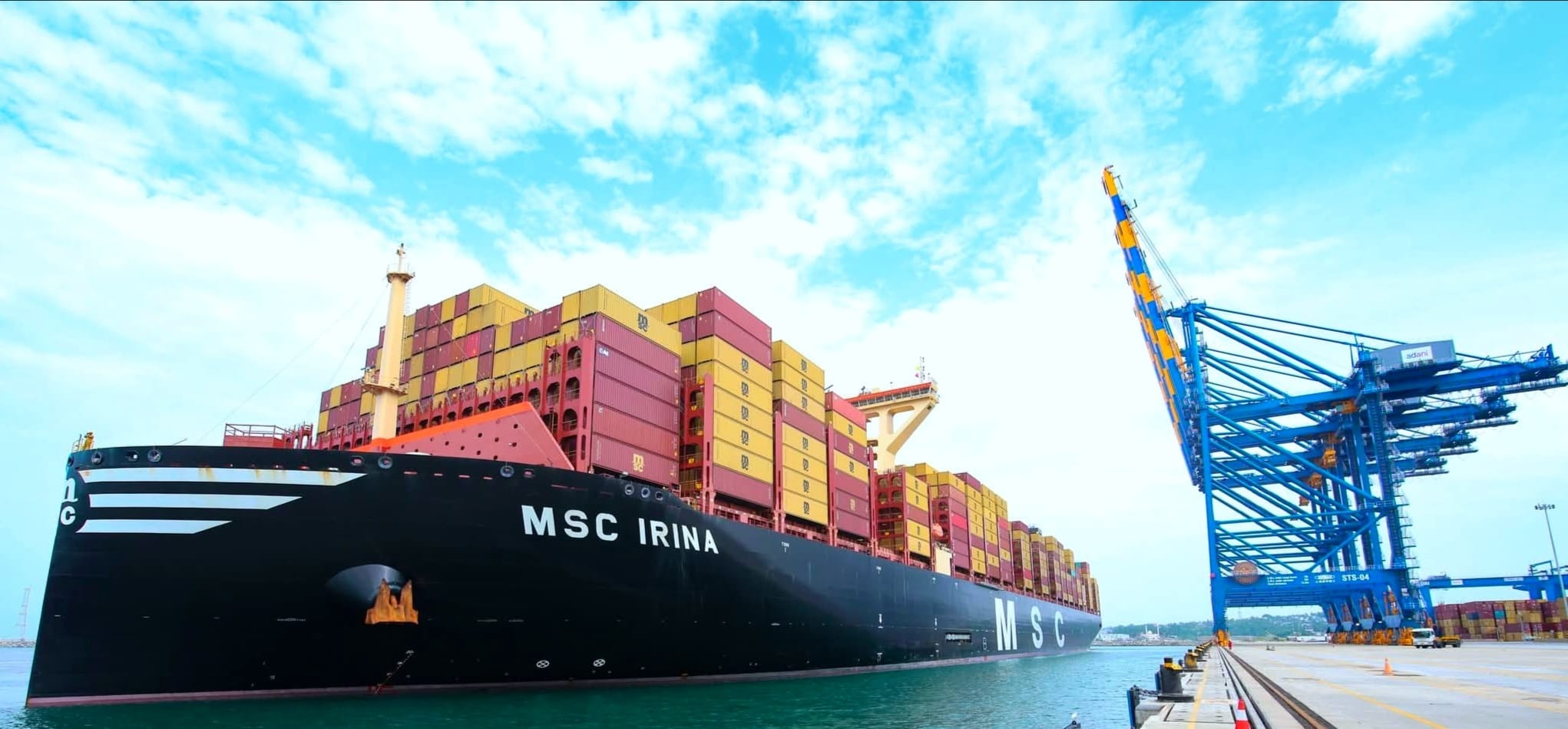
Arrival of MSC Irina, the world's largest container ship, arriving at Trivandrum in June 2025, marking its first arrival at a South Asian port

Thiruvananthapuram is a major aerospace research centre in India. The Vikram Sarabhai Space Centre, the most significant and leading centre of ISRO, and several space-related, state-owned ISRO centres such as Thumba Equatorial Rocket Launching Station, the Liquid Propulsion Systems Centre, and the ISRO Inertial Systems Unit are based in Thiruvananthapuram. The BrahMos Aerospace Trivandrum Limited is one of the leading missile integration and defence production units in India. Other enterprises include Travancore Titanium Products, Kerala Automobiles Limited, MILMA, English Indian Clays, Keltron, Trivandrum Rubber Works and HLL Lifecare Limited.

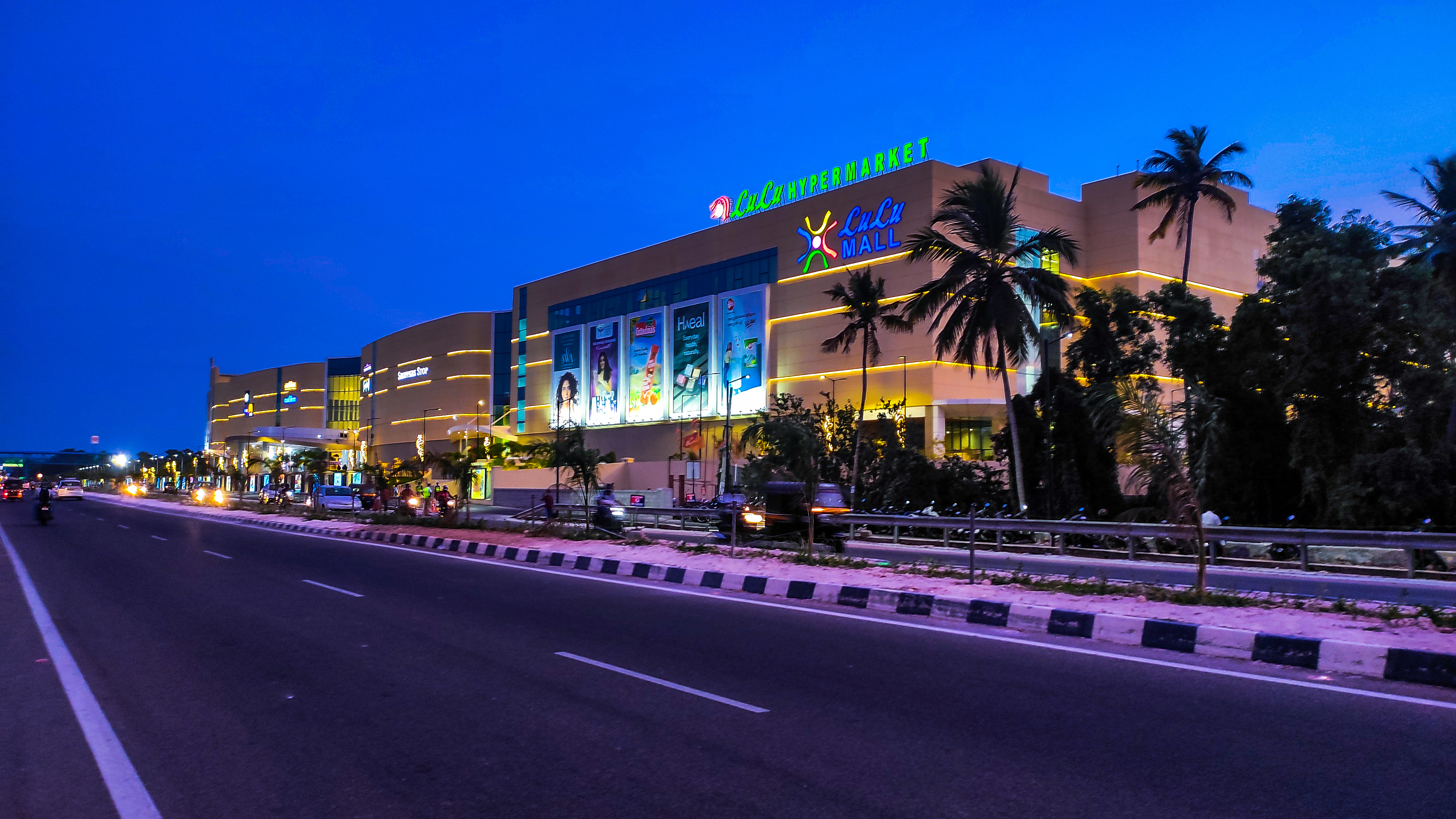
A highway at Thiruvananthapuram

Thiruvananthapuram is a major IT and ITES hub in India. The city contributes about 40-45% of Kerala's total software exports. Thiruvananthapuram houses major multinational Technology companies like Oracle Corporation, Nissan, HCL Tech, Accenture, Allianz Technology, Envestnet, Tata Consultancy Services, Infosys, UST Global, Ernst & Young, Flytxt, Guidehouse, Tata Elxsi, McKinsey & Company, RR Donnelley and Quest Global. Technopark is the largest information-technology park in India in terms of built-up area. It is the largest employment base campus in Kerala with 52,000 IT/ITES professionals and about 400 companies. Other IT, media and industrial campuses include Kinfra Film and Video Park, Kinfra Apparel Park, B-HUB and Chithranjali Film Complex. Other major IT, biotechnology and industrial campuses include Technocity, Bio 360 Life sciences park and Digital Science Park.

Tourism is a significant economic sector. The presence of natural attractions like beaches, backwaters, hills, and plantations and attractions like heritage, history, Ayurveda, medical tourism and knowledge centres attract many tourists. The city experienced a surge of investment in the real estate, infrastructure and retail sectors in 2016–17.

=== Port-based development ===
Thiruvananthapuram is a commercial port city with port-related infrastructure due to the presence of the Deepwater Container Transhipment port operated by the Vizhinjam International Seaport Ltd. Thiruvananthapuram.

The port is located close to international shipping routes, approximately 10 to 12 nautical miles (19 to 22 km) from the busy Persian Gulf–Malacca shipping lane. It has a natural depth of 18 to 20 metres (59 to 66 ft), enabling it to accommodate large container vessels. The berths are designed to handle vessels of up to 24,000 twenty-foot equivalent units (TEU). Port-related development has been associated with increased activity in logistics, warehousing, shipping services and supporting infrastructure, trade and transport connectivity.

=== Trivandrum Outer Ring Road ===
The proposed Trivandrum Outer Ring Road (ORR) (ORR), also known as the Outer Area Growth Corridor (OAGC), is a major infrastructure initiative aimed at supporting the long-term economic development of the city and its surrounding region. The corridor, extending approximately 78–80 km between Vizhinjam International Seaport Thiruvananthapuram and Navaikulam, is planned as a six-lane access-controlled highway with designated economic zones along its alignment. The TOAGC master plan envisages the development of multiple sector-specific clusters, including logistics, industrial development, information technology, healthcare, health tourism, general tourism, education, and commercial services, forming an integrated investment region around the capital area. Key nodes such as Vizhinjam, Kovalam, Vembayam, Mangalapuram, and Nedumangad have been identified for focused development, including a logistics hub at Vizhinjam and a health and tourism hub in the coastal belt. The project is also expected to strengthen connectivity between Vizhinjam International Seaport, the IT corridors, and the national highway network, thereby facilitating port-led industrial growth and regional economic expansion.

== Tourism ==
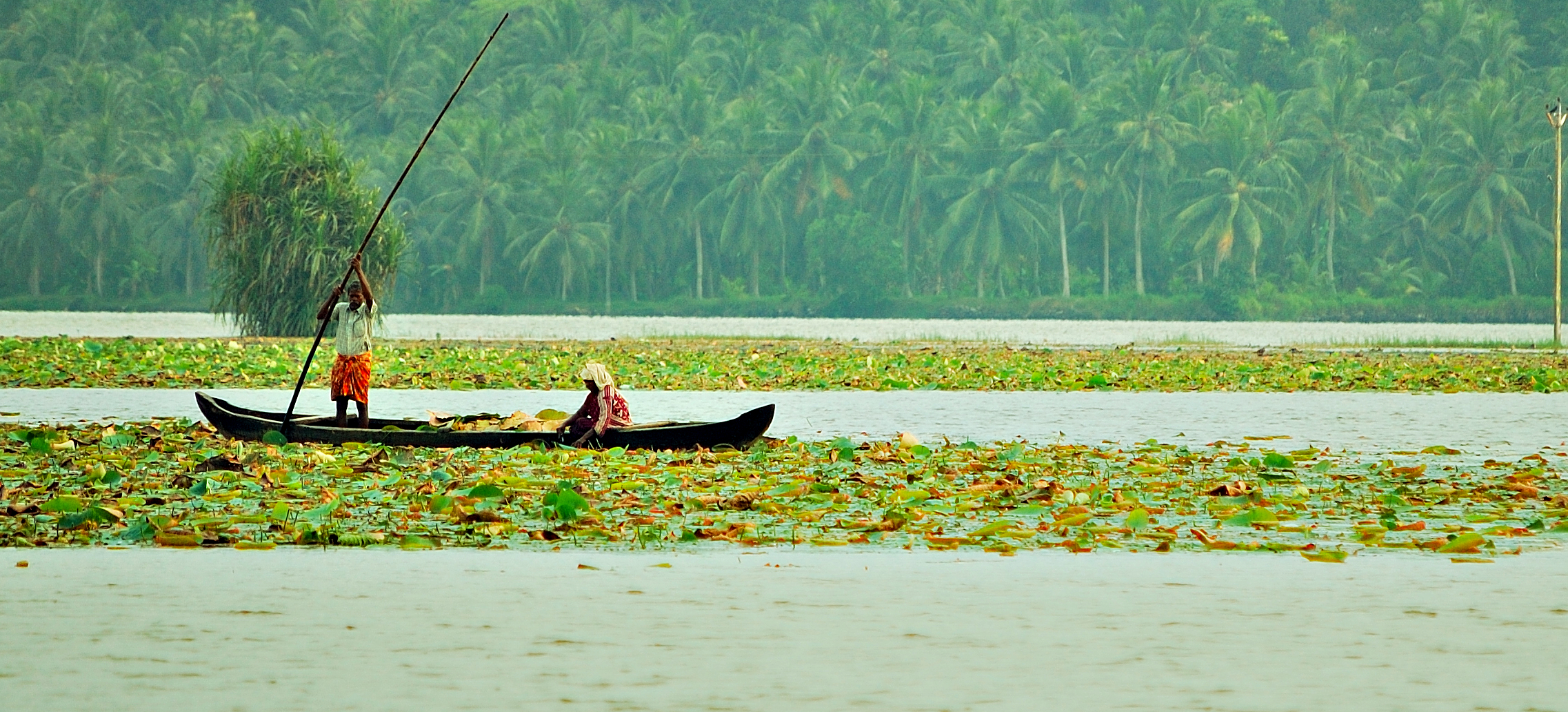
Harvesting lotus leaves from Vellayani Lake.

Thiruvananthapuram is a major tourist hub in India. Kovalam and Varkala are popular beach towns near the city. Other important beaches include Poovar, Shankumugham Beach, Azhimala Beach, Vizhinjam Beach and Veli Beach. Other places of interest include the Agasthyamala rain forests, Neyyar Wildlife Sanctuary, Kallar, Braemore, Ponmudi hills, Poovar, the Anchuthengu backwaters, Varkala Cliffs and Kappil-Edava lakes.

The city is also known for its unique style of architecture involving Kerala Architecture with British and Dravidian influences. Napier museum, Thiruvanathapuram Zoo, Padmanabha Swamy temple, Kuthira Malika palace, Kilimanoor palace and The Thiruvananthapuram Golf Club heritage building are examples of this.

The main museums include the Kerala Science and Technology Museum (with its attached Priyadarsini Planetarium), the Napier Museum, the Kerala Soil Museum and the Koyikkal Palace Museum. Agasthyamala Biosphere Reserve is listed in UNESCO's World Network of Biosphere Reserves.

== Culture ==
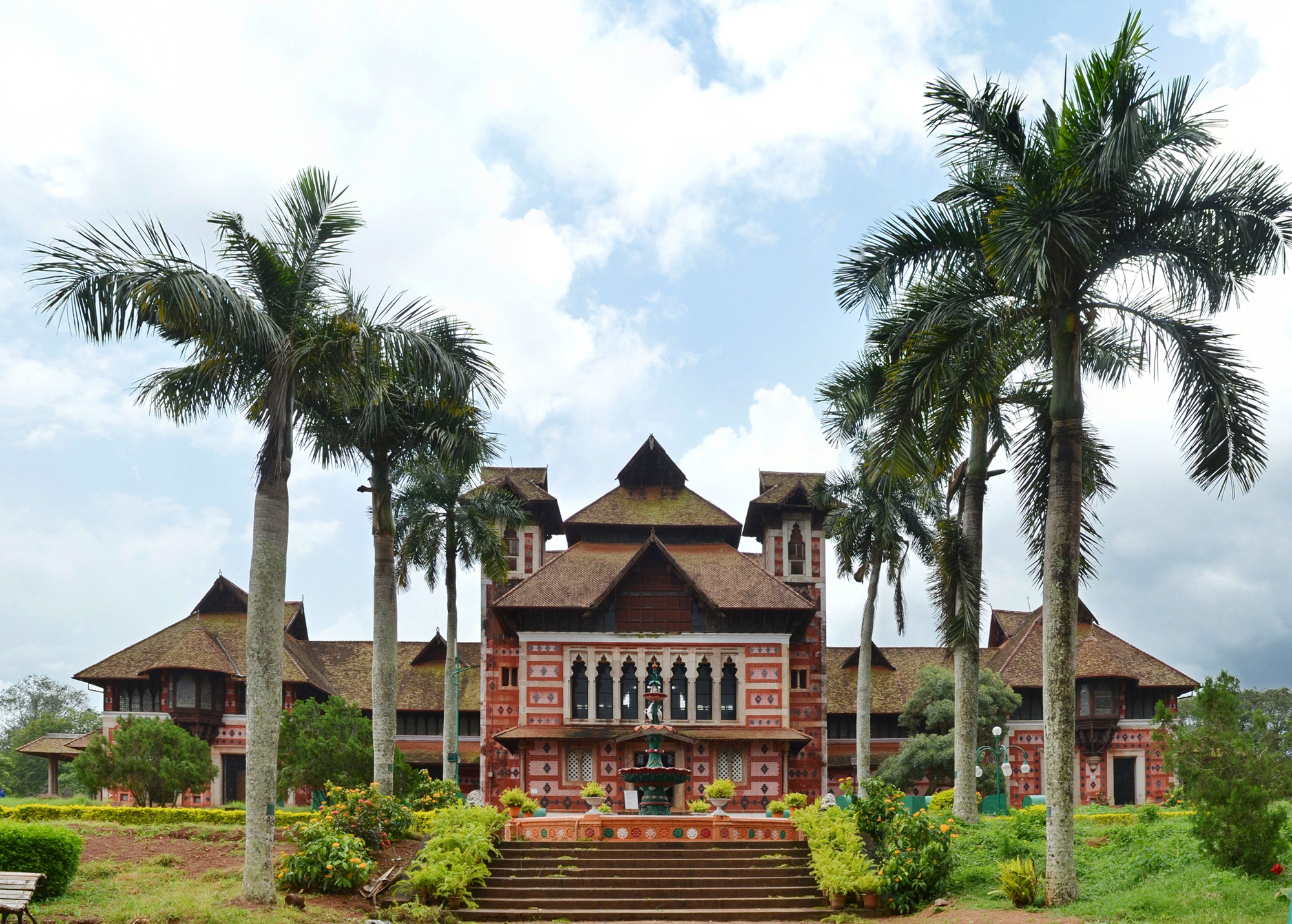
Established in 1855, the Napier Museum contains a vast collection of Ancient paintings and archaeological artefacts

Thiruvananthapuram is known as the "Evergreen City of India" because of its green landscapes and the presence of many public parks. Thiruvananthapuram has historically been a cultural hub in Southern India due to the development of arts, architecture and liberal customs by the rulers of erstwhile Thiruvananthapuram. As a testimony to this, renowned artists like Maharaja Swathi Thirunal and Raja Ravi Varma hail from the city. Prominent social reformers such as Sri Narayana Guru, Chattampi Swamikal, Ayyankali, Vakkom Moulavi and C. V. Raman Pillai also are from Thiruvananthapuram.

Two of the three Malayalam triumvirate poets, Ulloor S. Parameswara Iyer and Kumaran Asan are from Thiruvananthapuram. Annual literature festivals like the Kovalam Literary Festival, are held in the city. Literary development is further aided by state institutions such as the State Central Library, one of the oldest public libraries in India, which was established in 1829, and other major libraries including the Thiruvananthapuram Corporation Central library, and the Kerala University Library. Thiruvananthapuram has been a hub of classical music since the days of Maharaja of Travancore, Swathi Thirunal. Thiruvananthapuram is known for many music festivals like the Navarathri Music Festival, one of the oldest festivals of its kind in South India, Swathi Sangeethotsavam, Soorya Music fest, Neelakanta Sivan Music Fest and many other music festivals are organised by various cultural groups. The 111-day-long Soorya Festival is the biggest art and cultural event in Kerala. The Soorya Festival features film festivals, theatre festivals, dance, music, painting and photography exhibitions.

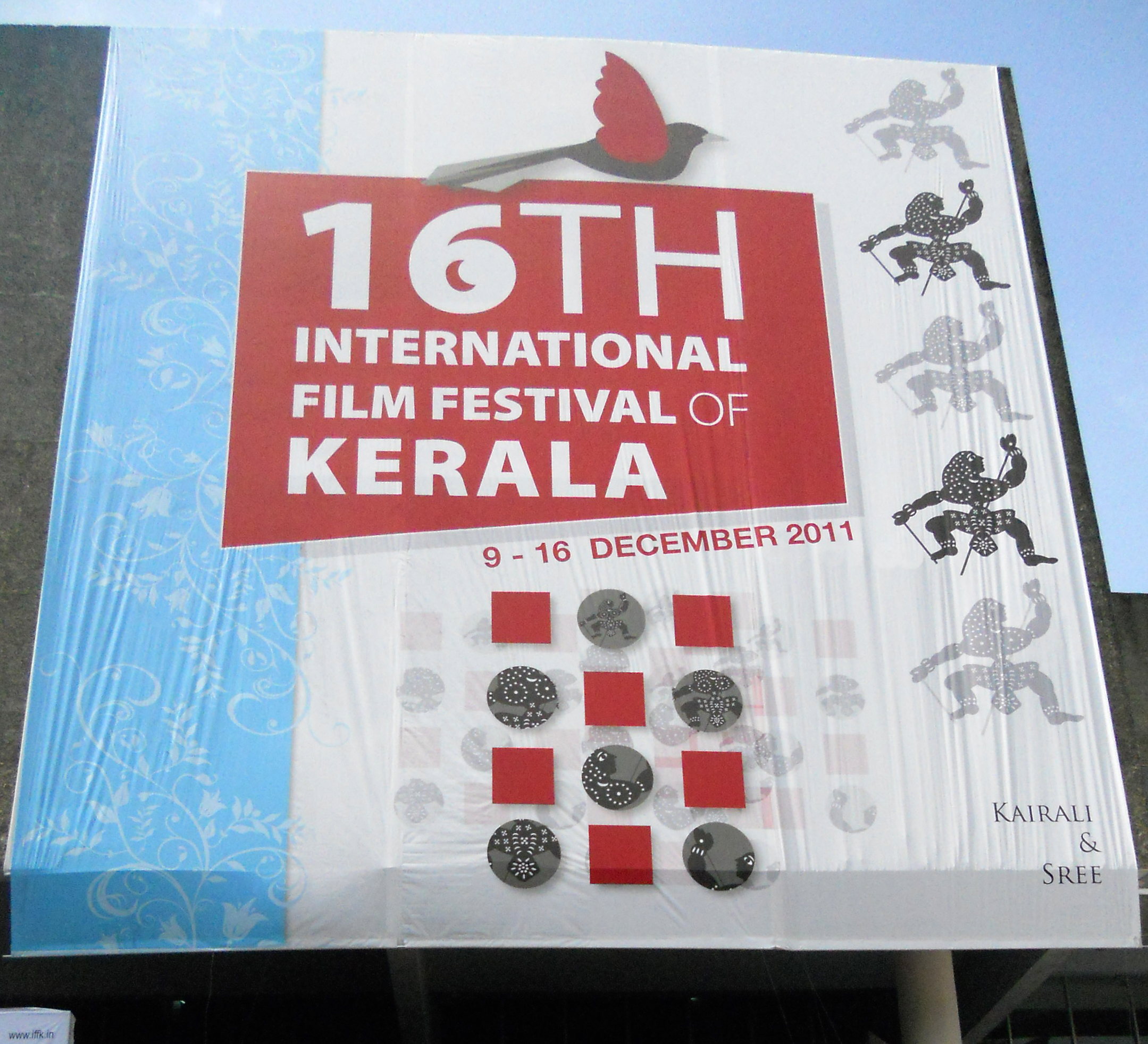
16th IFFK 2011 banner at Kairali Theater Complex

The Malayalam film Industry was started in Thiruvananthapuram. The first Malayalam feature film, Vigathakumaran, directed by J. C. Daniel, was released in Thiruvananthapuram. J. C. Daniel is considered the father of the Malayalam film industry. He also established the first film studio in Kerala, the Travancore National Pictures at Thiruvananthapuram in 1926. The International Film Festival of Kerala (IFFK), which is held every year in December, is one of Asia's largest film festivals in terms of viewer participation. In addition to various film festivals, the presence of the Central Board of Film Certification's regional office, many movie studios and production facilities like the Uma Studio, Chitranjali Studio, Merryland Studio, Kinfra Film and Video Park and Vismayas Max contribute to the growth of Thiruvananthapuram as a centre of cinema.

Apart from the famous Padmanabhaswamy Temple, the city's architecture is championed by the Napier Museum and Thiruvananthapuram Zoo, one of the oldest zoos in India. Other architectural landmarks include Kuthira Malika Palace, Kowdiar Palace, Attukal Bhagavathy Temple, Beemapally Mosque, Connemara Market, and the Mateer Memorial Church. Thiruvananthapuram was the main centre of Laurie Baker's architecture.

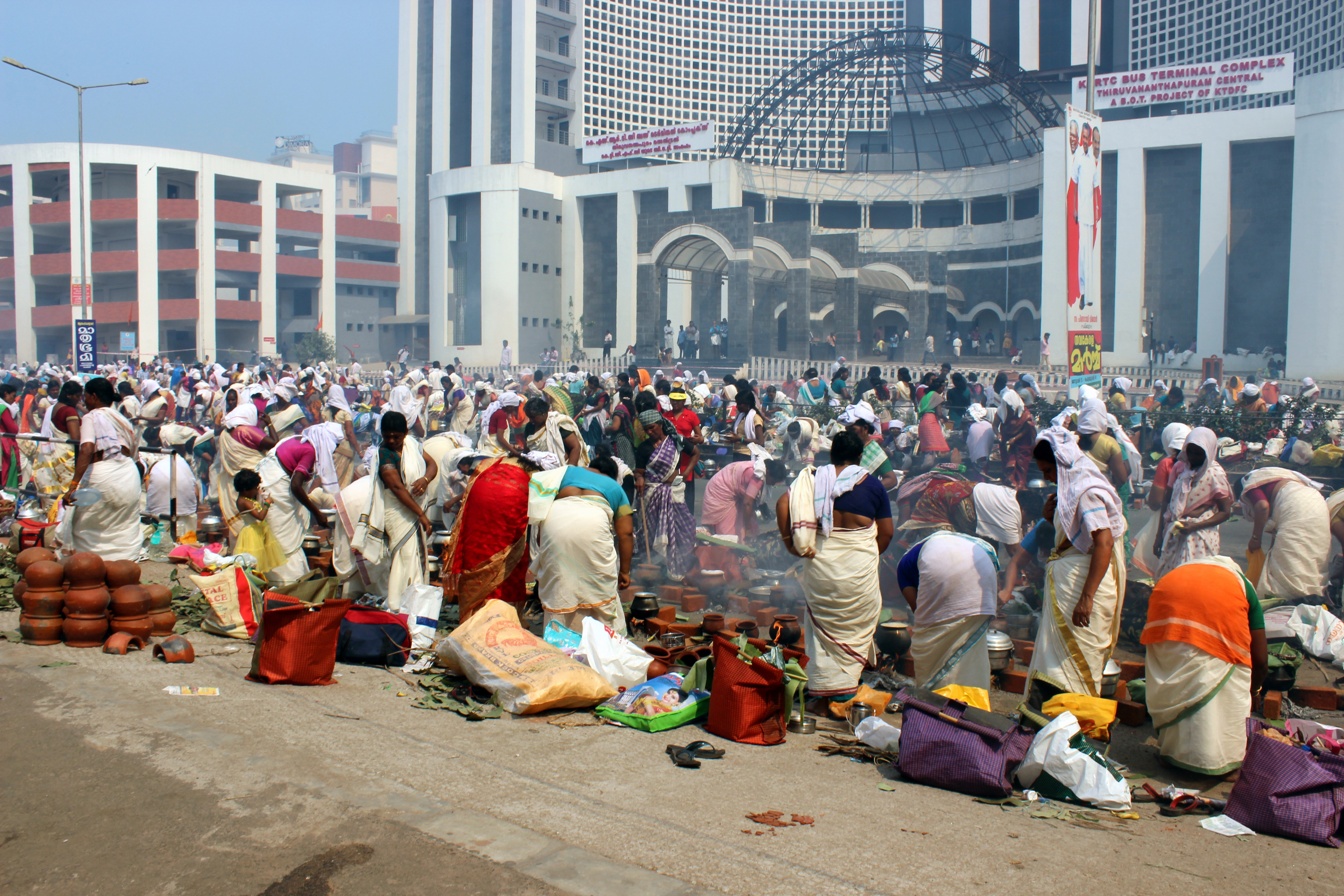
Attukal Pongala festival marks the world's largest gathering of women

Along with the major festivals of Onam, Vishu, Deepavali, and Navaratri, Christian and Islamic festivals like Christmas, Eid ul-Fitr, Bakrid and Milad-e-sheriff, the diverse ethnic populace of the city celebrates several local festivals like Attukal Pongala, Beemapally Uroos, Vettukaad Church Festival, Padmanabhaswamy Temple Aaraattu and Lakshadeepam festival. During the Onam festival, the state government conducts several cultural events for a week in the city. The Attukal Pongala festival attracts millions of women devotees from across India and abroad. It is the largest gathering of women in the world. Germany's Goethe Zentrum, France's Alliance Française and Russia's Gorky Bhavan centres host a wide range of events and programmes throughout the year.

=== Fashion ===
Thiruvananthapuram has a long-standing connection with textile traditions, especially through the Balaramapuram Handlooms industry. Known for its cotton fabrics with kasavu (gold zari borders), the region's weaving techniques have remained largely unchanged since the 18th century. The handwoven fabrics continue to feature in both traditional attire and contemporary fashion collections, including international showcases.

Modern fashion is also well-represented in the city, with shopping malls like Lulu Mall and Mall of Travancore hosting popular domestic and international clothing brands, reflecting current global trends in apparel and lifestyle.

=== Ayurveda ===
Thiruvananthapuram and the erstwhile kingdom of Travancore (Thiruvithamkoor) played an important role in the development and patronage of Ayurveda in Kerala. Travancore rulers extended support to Sanskrit scholarship, temple-centred healing traditions, Ayurveda colleges and hereditary physician families, contributing significantly to the preservation of classical Kerala Ayurveda.

Among the traditional Ayurvedic lineages associated with Kerala's Ashtavaidya heritage is the Pulamanthole Mooss family of present-day Malappuram district. The family belongs to the Ashtavaidya tradition, a hereditary group of physician families renowned for expertise in all eight branches of Ayurveda.

Historical traditions and regional accounts state that physicians from the Pulamanthole Mooss lineage maintained connections with members of the Travancore royal family and aristocracy through consultation and treatment practices during the princely state period. The broader royal patronage toward Ayurveda under Travancore rulers contributed to the prominence of several traditional physician families across Kerala.

The Pulamanthole Mooss tradition is associated with the study and clinical application of the Ashtanga Hridayam, one of the foundational texts of Ayurveda attributed to Vagbhata. Regional traditions also connect the Pulamanthole region with Kerala's long-standing Ayurvedic and Sanskrit scholarly heritage.

Institutions connected with the lineage include Pulamanthole Mooss Ayurveda Hospital and related treatment centres engaged in Panchakarma, neurological rehabilitation, musculoskeletal disorders and hereditary condition management.

The lineage has been represented by physicians including Ashtavaidyan Pulamanthole Sankaran Mooss, Ashtavaidyan Sree Raman Mooss, Ashtavaidyan Aryan Narayanan Mooss and Ashtavaidyan Jayasankaran Mooss.

The tradition also maintains cultural and spiritual associations with the Sree Rudhra Dhanwanthari Temple at Pulamanthole, a temple dedicated to Lord Dhanwanthari, regarded in Hindu tradition as the deity of Ayurveda and healing. Rituals including the Sarva Roga Shamana Pooja are associated with prayers for relief from illness and are attended by devotees from different regions.

The Pulamanthole Mooss tradition gained wider recognition in Kerala cultural history through associations with Carnatic musician Chembai Vaidyanatha Bhagavatar, who reportedly underwent Ayurvedic treatment under the tradition after suffering voice-related ailments.

In contemporary times, institutions associated with the Pulamanthole Mooss lineage have expanded their activities through charitable healthcare and social welfare initiatives including Ayurveda Thanal, aimed at improving access to Ayurvedic treatment and support for economically disadvantaged communities.

== Cuisine ==
Thiruvananthapuram's cuisine reflects local food traditions shaped by its historical and cultural background, including influences from the former Travancore royal kitchens, coastal trade, and religious diversity. The city's food culture includes a variety of vegetarian and non-vegetarian dishes, with rice, coconut, and spices forming the basis of most meals.

- Trivandrum Sadhya, a vegetarian meal served on a banana leaf, especially during festivals such as Onam and Vishu. It typically consists of multiple dishes including sambar, kalan, avial, olan, pachadi, varieties of payasam and Boli.
- Trivandrum Boli or Puran Poli, a traditional sweet dish made with lentils and flour, often served alongside desserts like payasam.
- Kethel Chicken Fry, from the year 1940, known for its preparation of deep-fried chicken served with small chapatis and onion salad.
- Vizhinjam Chicken Fry, a dish from the Vizhinjam area of Thiruvananthapuram City, characterized by its use of local spices and cooking methods.
- Travancore Biryani, a rice-based dish that combines regional ingredients with culinary influences from Mughal cuisine.
- Travancore Prawns Curry , is a dish with mild, balanced flavours from Thiruvananthapuram. It uses coconut milk, tamarind, and spices like black pepper and curry leaves, creating a less fiery taste compared to other regional seafood curries. The use of fresh, local ingredients gives it a distinct, subtle flavour profile.
- Trivandrum Tapioca Dishes, Tapioca was introduced to India in Thiruvananthapuram, the capital of the former princely state of Travancore, during the reign of Maharaja Ayilyam Thirunal Rama Varma (1860–1880). It was introduced by him as part of efforts to address food shortages and improve agricultural resilience. Common tapioca dishes from the region include Kappa Puzhukku, Kappa Vevichathu, Kappa Meen Curry, Kappa Erachi (Kappa Biriyani), Kappa Ularthiyathu, Chenda Kappa, Kappa with Ulli Chammanthi, and Tapioca Chips

Street food in Thiruvananthapuram includes items such as kappa (tapioca) with fish curry, parippu vada, banana chips, and unniyappam. Small eateries and roadside vendors are widespread throughout the city. The general cuisine of the people is Keralite cuisine, which is generally characterised by an abundance of coconut and spices. Other South Indian cuisines, as well as Chinese and North Indian cuisines, are popular. Thiruvananthapuram has many restaurants offering Arabic, Italian, Thai and Mexican cuisines.

== Health care ==
Thiruvananthapuram, the capital city of Kerala, has a robust healthcare system, with both government and private medical institutions offering comprehensive services. The Government Medical College, one of the oldest medical colleges in India, is a prominent centre for medical education and healthcare. The Sree Chitra Tirunal Institute for Medical Sciences and Technology (SCTIMST) is a well-known institution specializing in cardiology, neurology, and biomedical research. Other significant medical institutions include Rajiv Gandhi Centre for Biotechnology (RGCB), which focuses on advanced biotechnological research, and the Kerala Institute of Medical Sciences (KIMS), known for its multi-speciality services. Private hospitals like NIMS Hospital, Aster capital, and Lord's Hospital provide advanced care across various specialities, including cardiology, oncology, and orthopaedics. Additionally, Ayurvedic treatment centres are prevalent in the city, offering traditional healing methods. The city also provides palliative care services, with initiatives like the Arike Home Daycare Programme, which supports patients in need of end-of-life. care at home.

Medical Colleges in Thiruvananthapuram
Name	Type	Year of Establishment
Government Medical College, Thiruvananthapuram	Government	1951
Government Homeopathic Medical College, Iranimuttom	Government	1983
Government Ayurvedic Medical College, M.G.Road	Government	1889
Pankajakasturi Ayurvedic Medical College, Killi, Kattakkada	Private	2002
Dr. Somervell Memorial CSI Medical College Hospital, Karakkonam,Parassala	Private	2003
Trivandrum Dental College, Medical College Campus	Government	2004
Gokulam Medical College, Venjarammoodu	Private	2003
Santhigiri Siddha Medical College, Pothencode	Private	2002

Other major hospitals in Trivandrum include Kerala Institiute of Medical Science (KIMS), Ananthapuri Hospitals and Research Institutes (AHRI), SP Fort Hospital, Aster Capitol, Trivandrum International Medical Center, PRS Hospital, NIMS, Indian institute of Diabetes

== Transport ==
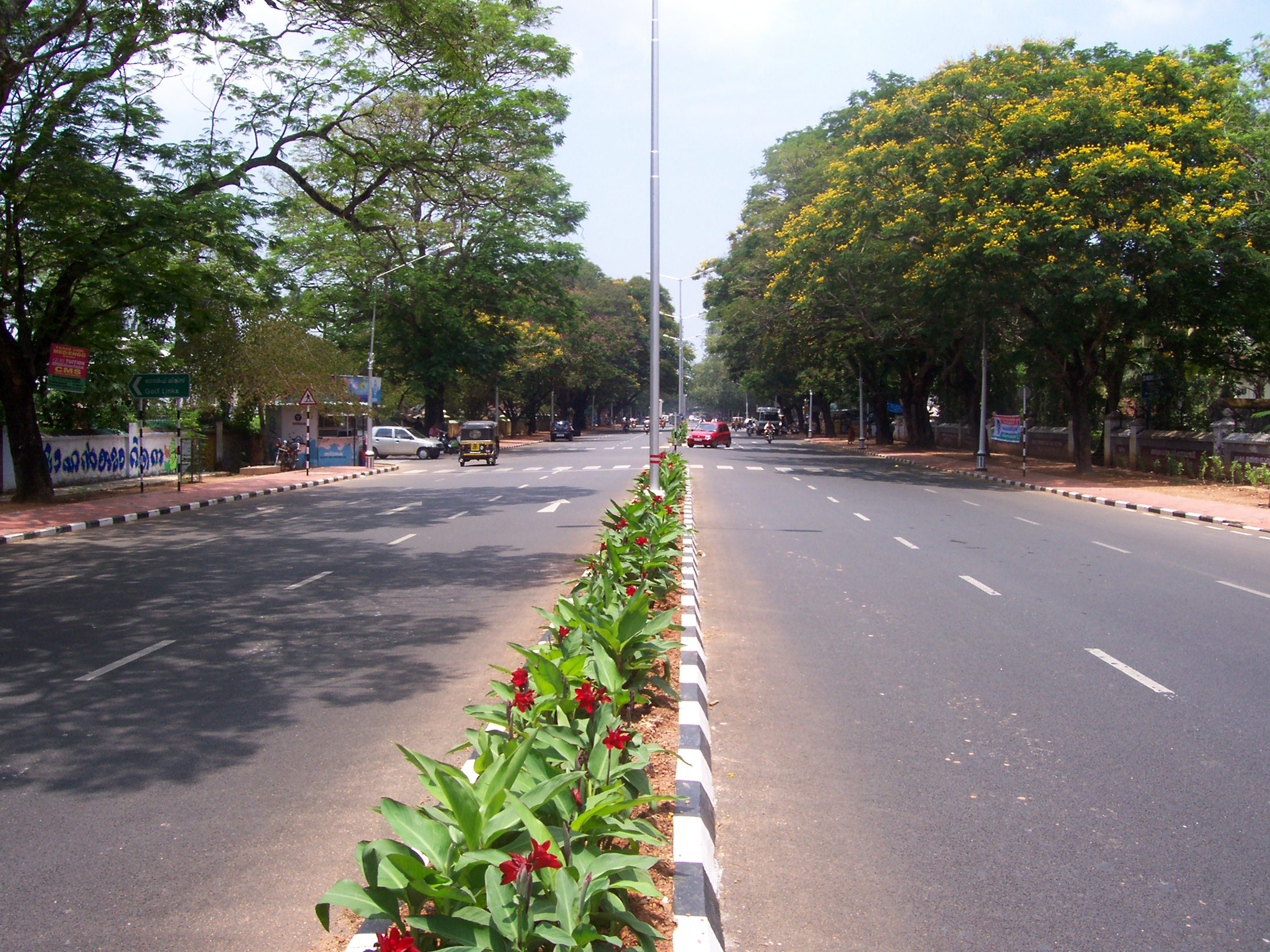
Kowdiar road; also known as the royal road or "Raja Veedhi", as it leads to the Kowdiar Palace

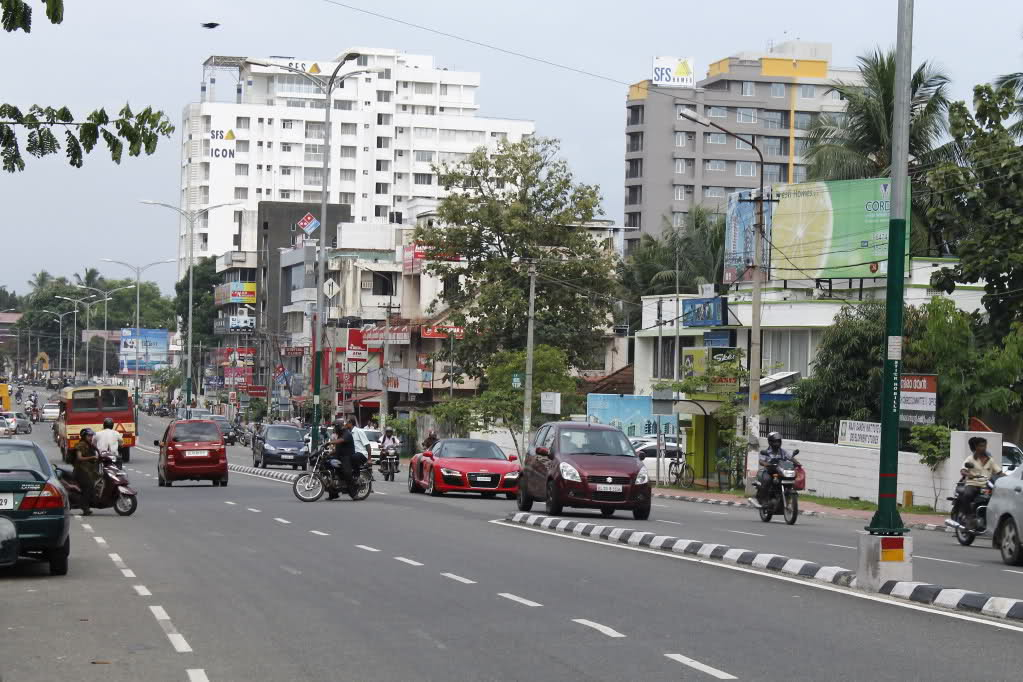
Another road in the city

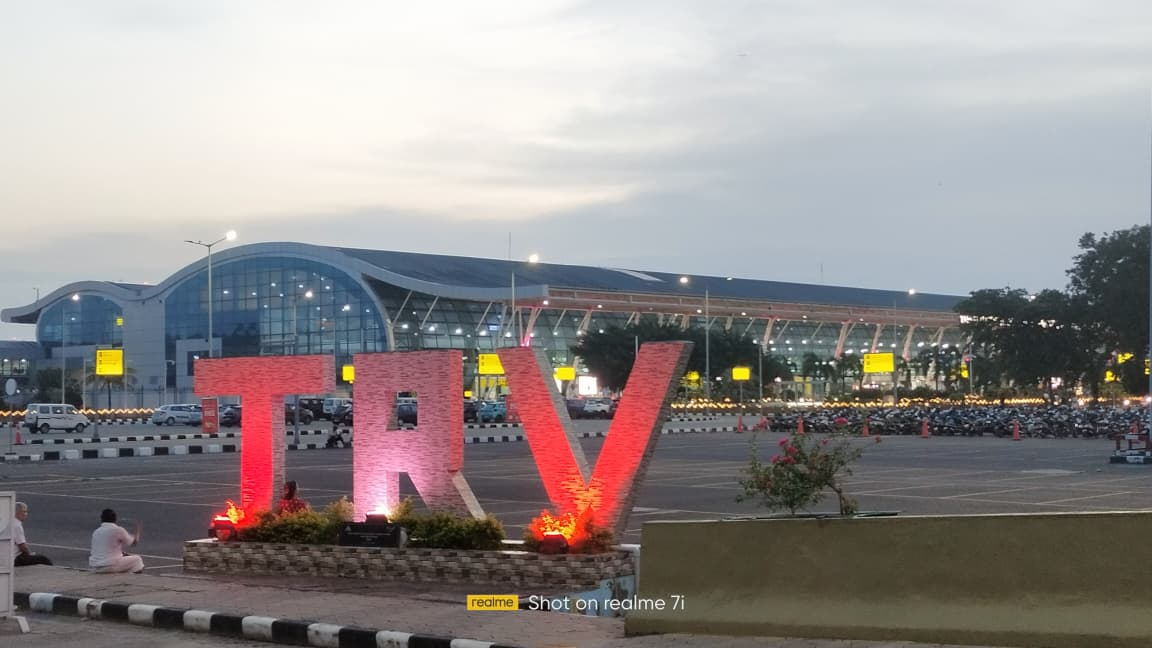
Thiruvananthapuram International Airport

=== Public transport ===
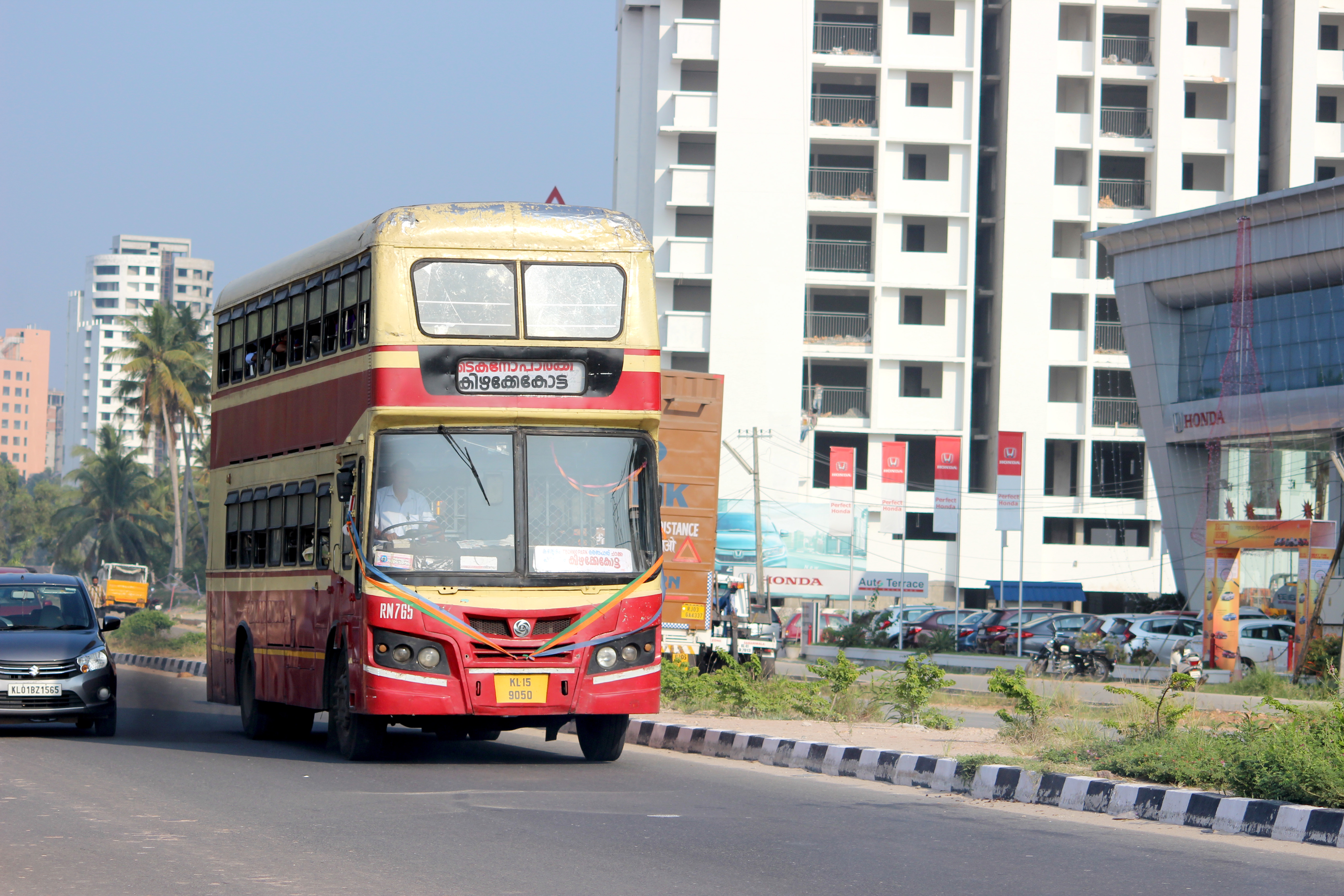
A KSRTC Double-decker bus in the city

The majority of bus services are conducted by government operators. There are also private operators. The city buses operated by Kerala State Road Transport Corporation (KSRTC) are an important and reliable means of public transport available in the city. The main bus stations in the city are the Central Bus Station in Thampanoor, where most of the long-distance buses ply from, and the city bus station in East Fort, where most city buses ply from. Three-wheeled, yellow and black auto-rickshaws and taxis, are other popular forms of public transport. Thiruvananthapuram Metro is a fully elevated metro rail – rapid transit system planned to ease the congestion in the city.

==== Metro ====
The Thiruvananthapuram Metro is a proposed 42.1 km Conventional Metro rail system with 37 stations. With 2 primary lines connecting key hubs like Kazhakuttom and Karamana. The idea of the Thiruvananthapuram Metro was first proposed in the early 2000s to cater to the growing population. In 2025, a high-level committee led by the Chief Secretary was formed to examine and finalize the metro's alignment. Three main routes under consideration are:

- Kazhakkoottam to Pappanamcode
- Kazhakkoottam to Killipalam
- Palayam to Civil Station

The alignment plan includes both underground and elevated sections.

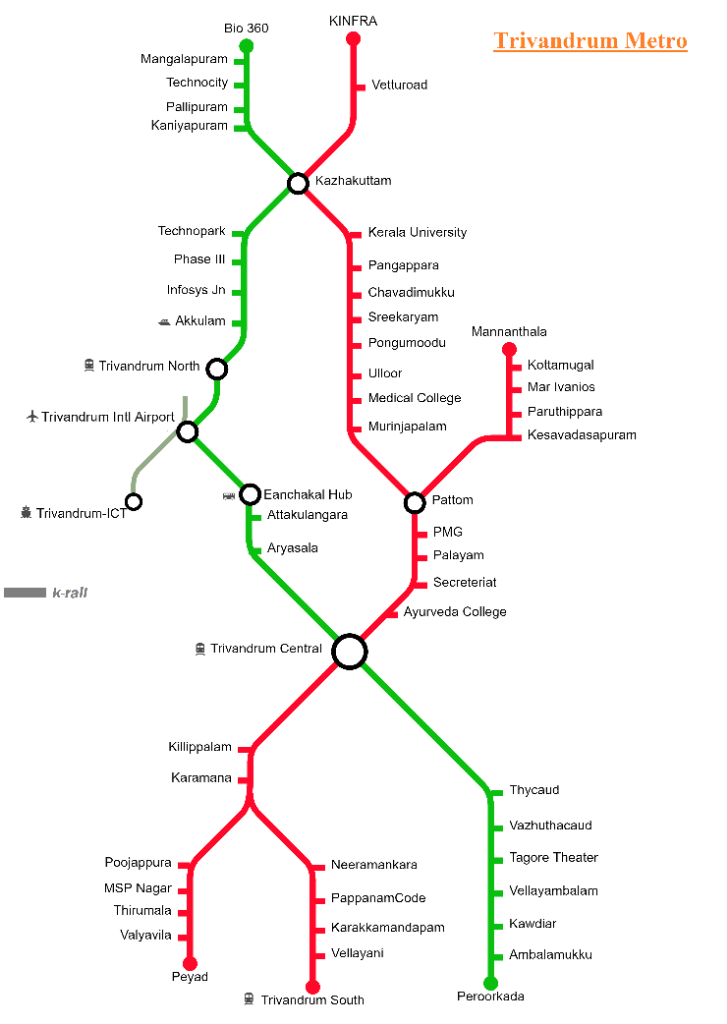
Proposed Trivandrum Metro route map

=== Road ===
Thiruvananthapuram has a well-developed road transport infrastructure. The roads in the city are maintained by the Thiruvananthapuram Roads Development Company Limited (TRDCL) and Kerala PWD. TRDCL manages the 42 km city roads which come under the Thiruvananthapuram City Roads Improvement Project (TRCIP), which is the first urban road project in India. TRCIP is a public-private partnership project to improve and maintain the existing road network in the city to cater to the needs of rapid urbanisation. TRCIP has won the International Road Federation's Global Road Achievement Awards in 2015. TCRIP has also been selected by United Nations as a replicable public-private partnership model. It was one of the 12 public-private partnership project case studies from across the world which fulfil the Sustainable Development Goals of the UN Agenda 2030. In 2024, Thiruvananthapuram became the first Indian city to win the UN global sustainability award.

Thiruvananthapuram is served by National Highway 66 of India's National Highways system. The city is connected to the North-South Corridor of the National Highway system at Aralvaimozhi, which is 80 km south of the city. The State Highway 1, which commonly known as the Main Central Road is an arterial highway in the city. Other major highways in the city are State Highway 2 and State Highway 45. The Mahatma Gandhi Road is the main arterial road in the city. Another important road is the Kowdiar Road, which is also known as the Royal Road, as it leads to the Kowdiar Palace.

=== Rail ===
Thiruvananthapuram is a divisional headquarters in the Southern Railway zone of the Indian Railways. Long-distance trains originate from Thiruvananthapuram Central and Thiruvananthapuram North railway terminals. Kochuveli railway terminal is developed to ease congestion on the central station and it acts as a satellite station to Thiruvananthapuram Central. Thiruvananthapuram Central is the busiest railway station in Kerala. Other railway stations in the city are Thiruvananthapuram North, Thiruvananthapuram Pettah, Thiruvananthapuram South railway station, Veli railway station and Kazhakoottam railway station. Being the southernmost municipal corporation in India, many long train services of Indian Railways originate from Thiruvananthapuram like the Thiruvananthapuram Rajdhani Express, the Thiruvananthapuram - Silchar Superfast Express and the Thiruvananthapuram North - Amritsar Weekly Express. There are plans to develop a railway terminal at Thiruvananthapuram South railway station to reduce congestion at Thiruvananthapuram Central.

Thiruvananthapuram Metropolitan Region
Station Name	Station Code	Railway Zone	Number of Platforms	No. of Tracks
Thiruvananthapuram Central Rlwy	TVC	SR	5	16
Thiruvananthapuram North Rlwy	TVCN	SR	6 (10*)	13
Thiruvananthapuram South Rlwy	TVCS	SR	2 (5*)	3 (12*)
Thiruvananthapuram Petta Rlwy	TVP	SR	2	2
Kazhakuttam Railway Station	KZK	SR	3	4
Veli Railway Station	VELI	SR	3	4
Chirayinkeezhu Railway Station	CRY	SR	2	2
Neyyattinkara Railway Station	NYY	SR	2	2
Balaramapuram Railway Station	BRAM	SR	1	
Kadakkavoor	KVU	SR	3	4
Kaniyapuram	KXP	SR	2	

(* Indicates that its currently under construction.)

=== Air ===
Thiruvananthapuram is served by the Thiruvananthapuram International Airport, located at Chakka, only 6.7 km (4.2 mi) from the city centre. The airport started operations in 1935 and is the first airport in Kerala. Being one of the gateways to the state, it has direct connectivity to all the major cities in India as well as the Middle East, Malaysia, Singapore, the Maldives and Sri Lanka. As the city is headquarters of the Southern Air Command (SAC) of the Indian Air Force, Thiruvananthapuram International Airport caters to the Indian Air Force (IAF) and the Coast Guard for their strategic operations. The IAF has an exclusive apron to handle all their operations. The airport also caters to the Rajiv Gandhi Academy for Aviation Technology which carries out pilot-training activities.

=== Sea ===
Thiruvananthapuram has two ports, Vizhinjam International Seaport Thiruvananthapuram and Vizhinjam Port. Ultra-large container vessels call at the Vizhinjam International Seaport Thiruvananthapuram. Small vessels and small cruise ships use Vizhinjam Port. A cruise village has been proposed at Vizhinjam International Seaport Thiruvananthapuram, as part of the port development plan. A cruise terminal for large cruise vessels is under construction at the port. The project is intended to support cruise tourism by providing passenger handling facilities and related services.

Trivandrum will also be connected through the 616 kilometres (383 mi) Kovalam-Bekkel waterway project.

== Education ==
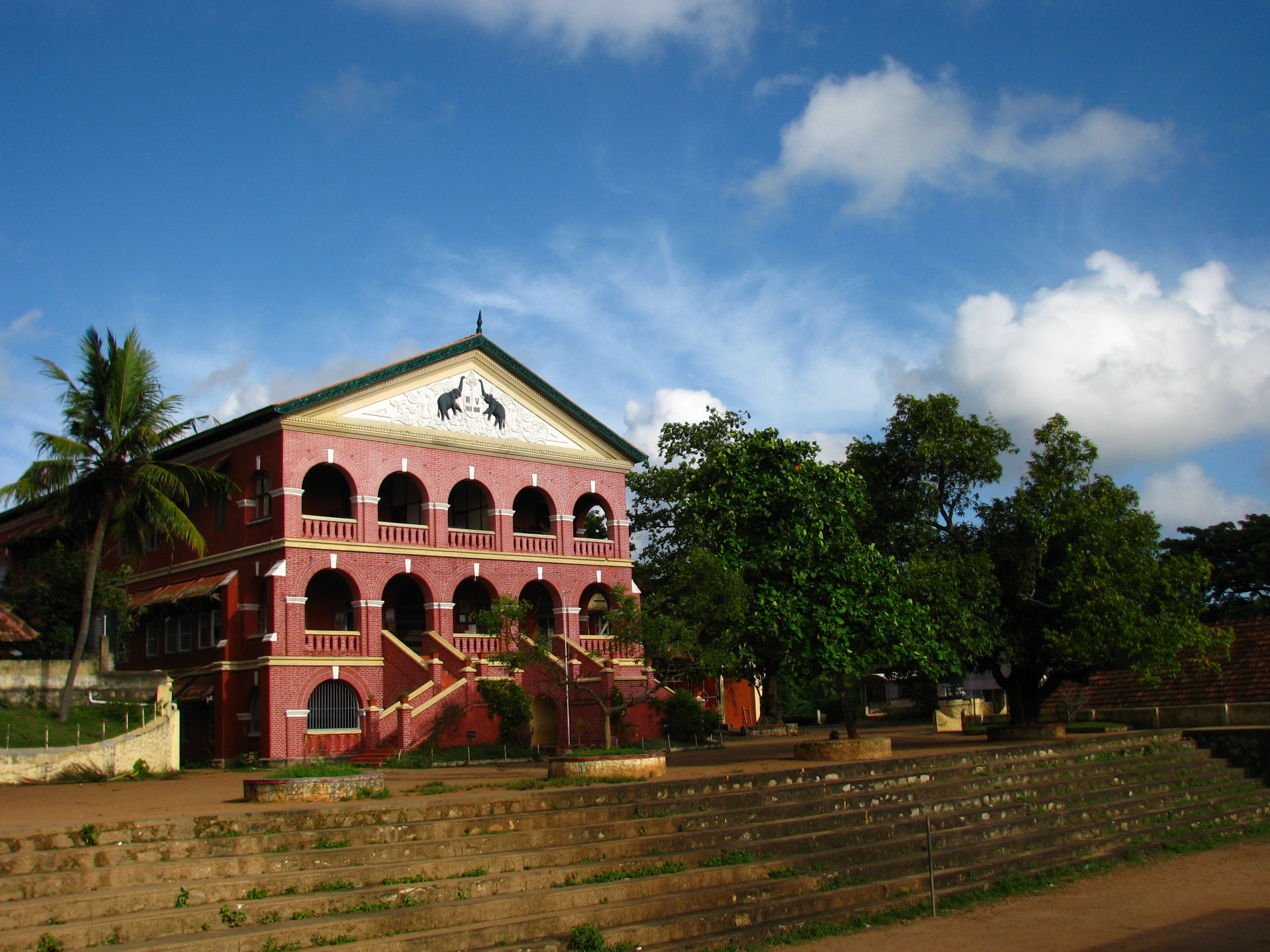
Model School Trivandrum, founded in 1885, is one of the oldest schools in Kerala.

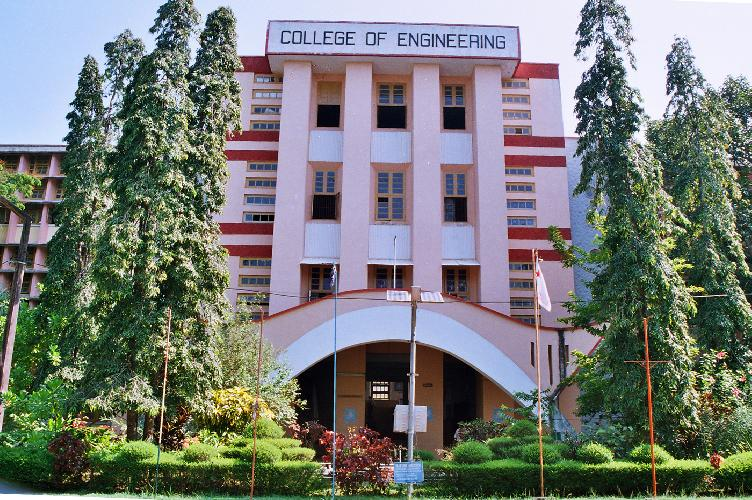
Main Block of College of Engineering Trivandrum.

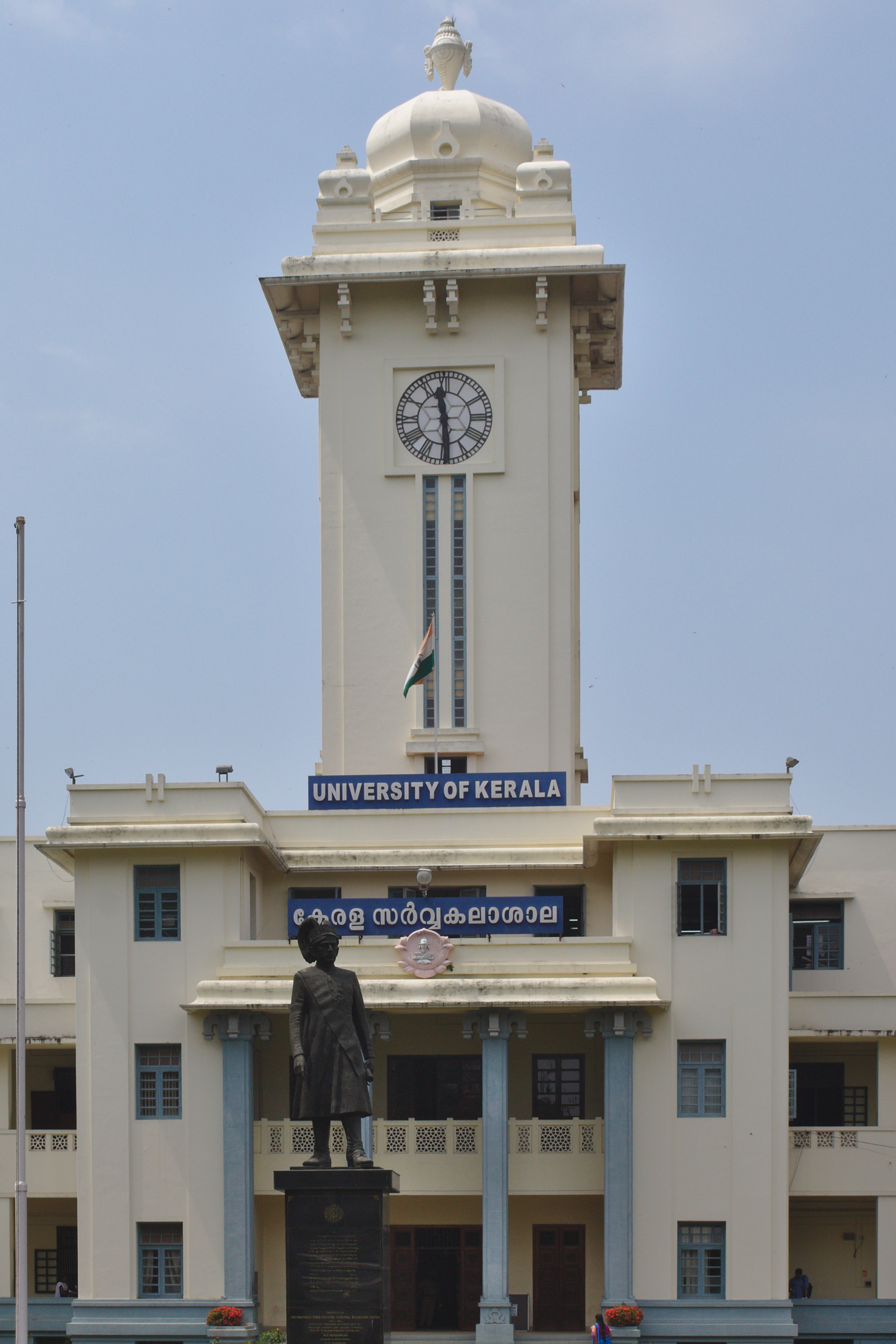
Clock Tower at the University of Kerala

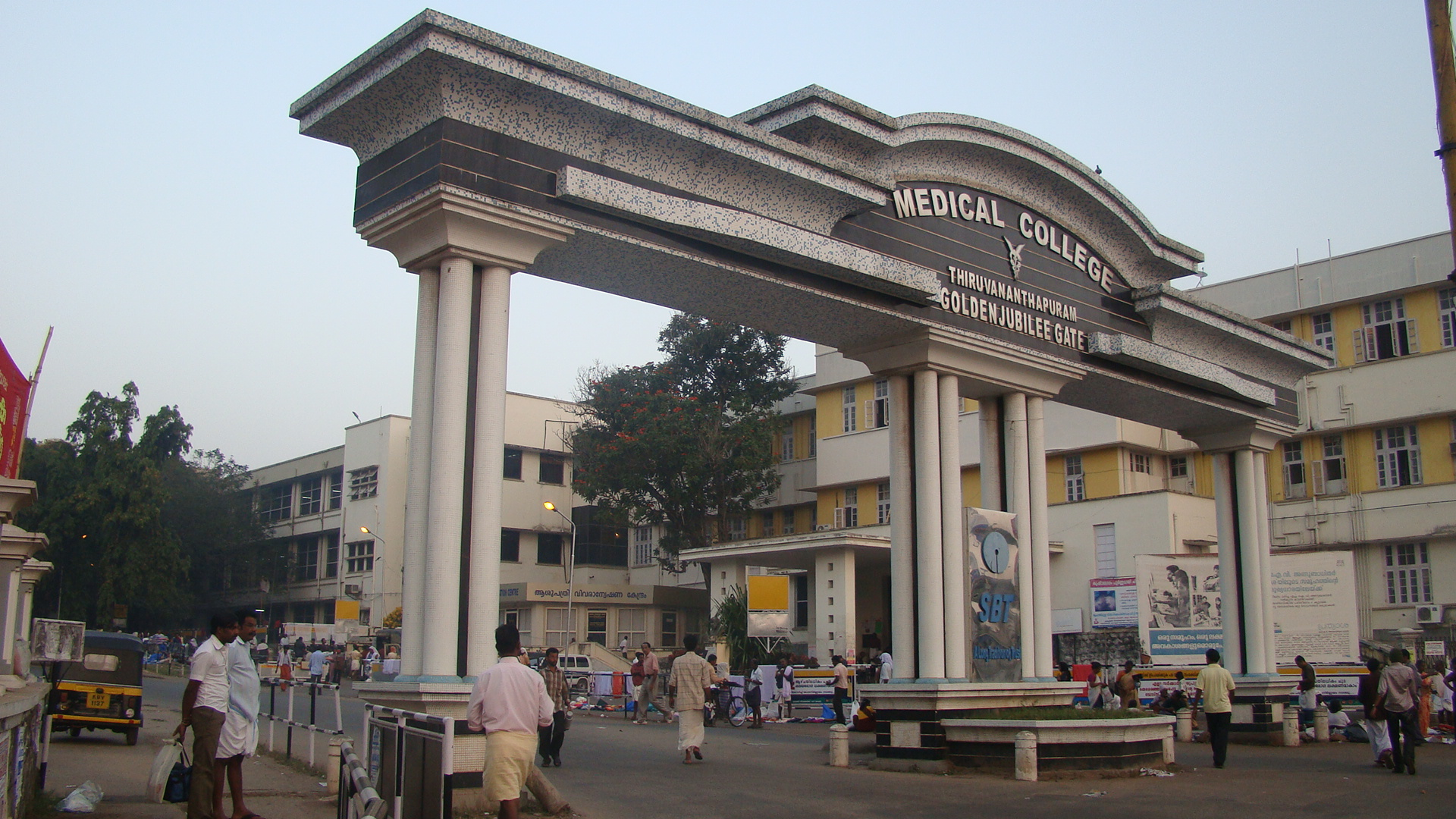
Main gate of Medical college

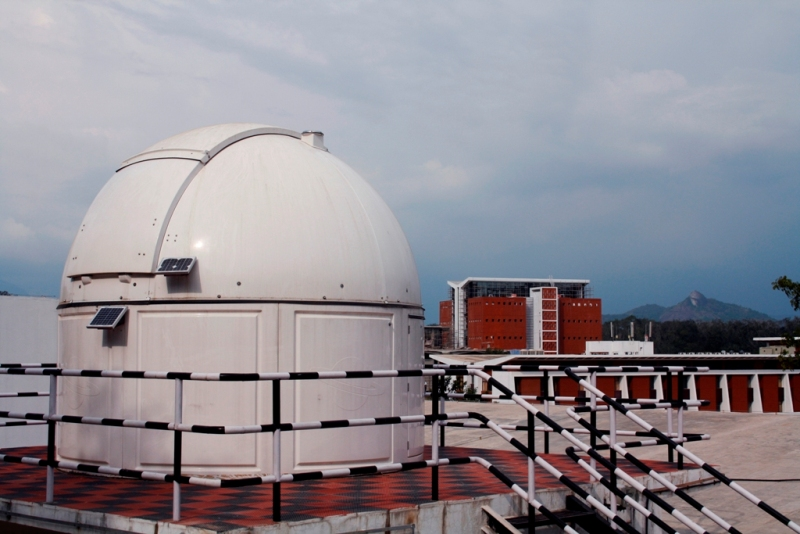
Observatory in Indian Institute of Space Science and Technology

=== Primary and secondary education ===
Schools in Thiruvananthapuram are classified as aided, unaided and Government schools. The government schools are run directly by the Kerala State Education Board and follow the syllabus prescribed by the state government. The aided schools also follow the state syllabus. Malayalam and English are the primary languages of instruction; Tamil and Hindi are also used. The schools are affiliated with The State Council of Educational Research and Training (SCERT), the Central Board of Secondary Education (CBSE), the Indian Certificate of Secondary Education (ICSE), the International General Certificate of Secondary Education (IGCSE) and the National Institute of Open Schooling (NIOS). In the National Achievement Survey conducted by the National Council of Educational Research and Training (NCERT), Thiruvananthapuram is ranked as the best city in Kerala.

SMV School

The notable schools in the city include St. Mary's Higher Secondary School, which is considered one of the largest schools in Asia, with the total number of students exceeding 12,000, the Government Model Boys Higher Secondary School, the Government Higher Secondary School for Girls, Holy Angel's Convent Trivandrum, SMV School, Trivandrum International School, Chinmaya Vidyalayas, Kendriya Vidyalaya, Loyola School, Christ Nagar School, Thiruvananthapuram, Sarvodaya Vidyalaya, Nirmala Bhavan Higher Secondary School, Arya Central School, Jyothi Nilayam School, St. Joseph's Higher Secondary School, St. Thomas Residential School, The Oxford School and VSSC Central School.

=== Higher education and research ===
Thiruvananthapuram is a major educational and research hub with various institutions in the fields of space science, information technology, physical science, biotechnology, engineering and medicine. There are three universities in Thiruvananthapuram: two state universities and one deemed university. The state universities are the University of Kerala and APJ Abdul Kalam Technological University. The Indian Institute of Space Science and Technology (IIST), is a government-aided institute and deemed university. IIST is the first of its kind in the country, to offer graduate courses and research in space sciences, space technology and space applications. The city also houses two Institutes of National Importance; the Sree Chitra Tirunal Institute for Medical Sciences and Technology (SCTIMST) and the Indian Institute of Science Education and Research (IISER). Thiruvananthapuram is one of the regional headquarters of Indira Gandhi National Open University (IGNOU).

Universities in Trivandrum
University Name	Established	Type
University of Kerala	1937	Public
Indian Institute of Space Science and Technology (IIST)	2007	Public
Kerala University of Digital Sciences, Innovation and Technology (KUDSIT)	2020	Public
APJ Abdul Kalam Technological University (KTU)	2014	Public
National Forensic Sciences University (NFSU)	Upcoming	Public

The Government Medical College, Thiruvananthapuram is the first and a premier medical school in Kerala, founded in 1951. Other notable medical schools apart from the SCTIMST (which provides super-speciality courses in cardiac and neuroscience) and the Regional Cancer Centre, Thiruvananthapuram (which provides PG courses in radiotherapy and pathology, and super-specialty courses) includes the SUT Academy of Medical Sciences, Sree Gokulam Medical College and the Government Ayurveda College.

The city houses several prominent legal education institutions. The Government Law College, formed in 1875, is one of the oldest legal education institutions in India. The Kerala Law Academy is another major legal education institution. The major Business schools include the Asian School of Business, CET School of Management and the Institute of Management in Kerala (IMK). There are over 23 engineering education institutions in Thiruvananthapuram. Apart from IIST and IISER, the other major engineering education institutions include the College of Engineering, Trivandrum (CET), which is the first engineering college in Kerala, The Government Engineering College BartonHill (GEC), Sree Chitra Thirunal College of Engineering (SCT), ER & DCI Institute of Technology, the University College of Engineering, Mohandas college of Engineering and Technology and Mar Baselios College of Engineering and Technology. The University College Thiruvananthapuram established in 1866 and H.H. The Maharaja's College for Women established in 1864 are two of the oldest institutions of higher education in India.

Research Institutions in Trivandrum
Institution Name	Established	Type
Oriental Research Institute & Manuscripts Library	1903	Research & Education
Central Tuber Crops Research Institute (ICAR)	1963	Research & Education
Vikram Sarabhai Space Centre(VSSC)	1963	Research & Development
Kerala Highway Research Institute	1972	Research & Education
National Institute for Interdisciplinary Science and Technology (CSIR-NIIST)	1975	Research & Education
Regional Ayurveda Research Institute	1975	Research & Education
National Transportation Planning and Research Centre (Natpac)	1976	Research & Education
Sree Chitra Tirunal Institute for Medical Sciences and Technology(SCTIMST)	1976	Research & Education
National Centre for Earth Science Studies(NCESS)	1978	Research & Education
jawaharlal Nehru Tropical Botanic Garden and Research Institute (JNTBGRI)	1979	Research & Education
Regional Cancer Centre, Thiruvananthapuram (RCC)	1981	Research & Education
Liquid Propulsion Systems Centre (LPSC)	1985	Research & Development
National Informatics Centre (NIC) Kerala State Centre	1987	Research & Education
Kerala Institute of Tourism and Travel Studies (KITTS)	1988	Research & Education
Kerala University of Digital Sciences, Innovation and Technology (IIITM-k)	1988	Research & Education
National Institute for Interdisciplinary Science and Technology (NIIST)	1988	Research Institute
Rajiv Gandhi Centre for Biotechnology (RGCB)	1990	Research Institute
National Institute of Speech and Hearing (NIISH)	1997	Research & Education
Indian Institute of Diabetes	2001	Research & Education
Kerala State Council for Science, Technology and Environment (KSCSTE)	2002	Government Organization
Institute of Parliamentary Affairs	2004	Research & Education
Indian Institute of Space Science and Technology (IIST)	2007	Research & Education
Indian Institute of Science Education and Research (IISER)	2008	Research & Education
Centre for Development of Advanced Computing, Thiruvananthapuram (C-DAC)	2010	Research & Education
Siddha Regional Research Institute	2010	Research & Education
Public Policy Research Institute	2013	Research & Education
Crocodile Rehabilitation and Research Centre	2015	Research & Education
Trivandrum Engineering Science and Technology Research Park (TrEST)	2015	Research & Education
Institute of Advanced Virology, Kerala	2019	Research & Education
Marine Testing and Oceanographic Research Centre		Research & Education

Other prominent undergraduate and postgraduate colleges include the Government Arts College, Mahatma Gandhi College, Mar Ivanios College, the Government Sanskrit College, Loyola College of Social Sciences, St. Xavier's College and All Saints College. Major fine arts colleges are Swathi Thirunal College of Music, which is the first music academy in Kerala and the College of Fine Arts Trivandrum. The Lakshmibai National College of Physical Education is one of the two physical education academic institutes of the Sports Authority of India (SAI).

The premier research institutes in Thiruvananthapuram include: the Indian Institute of Information Technology and Management, Kerala (IIITMK), the National Institute of Speech and Hearing (NISH), the Rajiv Gandhi Centre for Biotechnology, the Centre for Development of Imaging Technology (C-Dit), the Centre for Development Studies (CDS), the Jawaharlal Nehru Tropical Botanic Garden and Research Institute, the National Centre for Earth Science Studies (NCESS), the Centre for Development of Advanced Computing (C-DAC) and the Oriental Research Institute & Manuscripts Library.

Kerala University is ranked as the best university in Kerala according to the MHRD's National Institutional Ranking Framework (NIRF). Kerala University also ranked top in overall institution rankings in Kerala. In engineering, the Indian Institute of Space Science and Technology (IIST) is ranked as the best in Kerala and the College of Engineering, Trivandrum (CET) is ranked third in Kerala. The College of Engineering, Trivandrum is also ranked fourth in India and first in Kerala in architecture institution rankings. The University College is listed as the best college in Kerala.

== Space and aerospace ==
Thiruvananthapuram is the birthplace of India's space operations. The first rocket launch in India occurred in Thiruvananthapuram in 1963 at the Thumba Equatorial Rocket Launching Station (TERLS). Since then, the city has emerged as a major hub for space research, institutions, and companies.

Space and Aerospace Research Institutions, Organizations, and Companies in Thiruvananthapuram
Name	Type	Description
Vikram Sarabhai Space Centre (VSSC)	R&D Institution	ISRO's lead centre for launch vehicle development.
Liquid Propulsion Systems Centre (LPSC)	R&D Institution	Develops liquid propulsion systems for rockets.
ISRO Inertial Systems Unit (IISU)	R&D Institution	Develops launch vehicle inertial systems, spacecraft inertial systems, inertial sensors evaluation and simulation, inertial system production, inertial systems electronic production etc.
Thumba Equatorial Rocket Launching Station (TERLS)	Spaceport	Located very close to Earth's magnetic equator. It is currently used for launching sounding rockets
Indian Institute of Space Science and Technology (IIST)	Academic Institution	Aisa's first Space university. Offers courses in space science and engineering.
BrahMos Aerospace	Defence Company	Produces the BrahMos supersonic cruise missile.
Keltron	Electronics Company	Engages in space and defence electronics.
KEL Aerospace	Aerospace Company	Focuses on aerospace component manufacturing.
K-Space Trivandrum	R&D Institution	Kerala government's space research initiative.
Hex 20	Space-Tech Startup	Specializes in satellite technology.
Ananth Technologies	Aerospace & Defence	Specializes in spacecraft systems, avionics, and satellite launch support for ISRO and other clients.
Strava Technologies	Aerospace & Defence	Provides electronic warfare, radar, and cybersecurity solutions to defence and aerospace sectors.
Aeroprecision	Aerospace & Defence	Develop and Supplies high-precision aviation and military components, offering MRO and supply chain solutions.
Safran	Aerospace & Defence	A French multinational offering aircraft engines, avionics, and defence systems globally.
Kortas	Aerospace	Develops precision aerospace components, including propellant systems and tanks for launch vehicles.

== International relations ==
Thiruvananthapuram is the location of the Consulate of the United Arab Emirates and the Consulate of the Maldives. The city also has the Honorary Consulates of Sri Lanka, Russia, and Germany, facilitating diplomatic and cultural engagements.

Consulates in Thiruvananthapuram
Country	Consulate
Germany	Honorary Consulate of Germany
Maldives	Consulate of the Maldives
Russia	Honorary Consulate of Russia
Sri Lanka	Honorary Consulate of Sri Lanka
United Arab Emirates	Consulate of the United Arab Emirates

== Media ==
Thiruvananthapuram has numerous newspaper publications, television and radio stations. Most of the media houses in Kerala are based in Thiruvananthapuram. The first Malayalam channel, Doordarshan Malayalam began broadcasting from the city in 1981. Asianet, the first private channel in Malayalam, also started its telecasting from the city in 1993. The other Malayalam channels based in the city include Asianet News, Amrita TV, Kappa TV, Kairali TV, Kairali We, Mathrubhumi News, Kaumudy TV, JaiHind TV, News18 Kerala and People TV. All major Malayalam channels, including Asianet, Janam TV, Jeevan TV, MediaOne TV and Manorama News have production facilities or offices in the city. TV channels are accessible via cable subscription, direct-broadcast satellite services, or internet-based television. Prominent Direct-to-Home (DTH) entertainment services in Thiruvananthapuram include Sun Direct DTH, DD Direct+, Dish TV, Airtel digital TV and Tata Play.

Major Malayalam newspapers available are Mathrubhumi, Malayala Manorama, Kerala Kaumudi, Deshabhimani, Madhyamam, Janmabhumi, Chandrika, Thejas, Siraj Daily, Deepika and Rashtra Deepika. The English language newspapers with editions from Thiruvananthapuram are The New Indian Express, The Hindu, The Deccan Chronicle and The Times of India.

All India Radio, the national state-owned radio broadcaster, airs Medium wave and Shortwave radio stations in the city. The Vividh Bharati of All India Radio also airs an FM radio station known as Ananthapuri FM. Other FM radio channels broadcast from Thiruvananthapuram are Big FM 92.7 MHz, Club FM 94.3 MHz, Radio Mirchi 98.3 MHz, Red FM 93.5 MHz and Radio DC 90.4 MHz.

== Sports ==
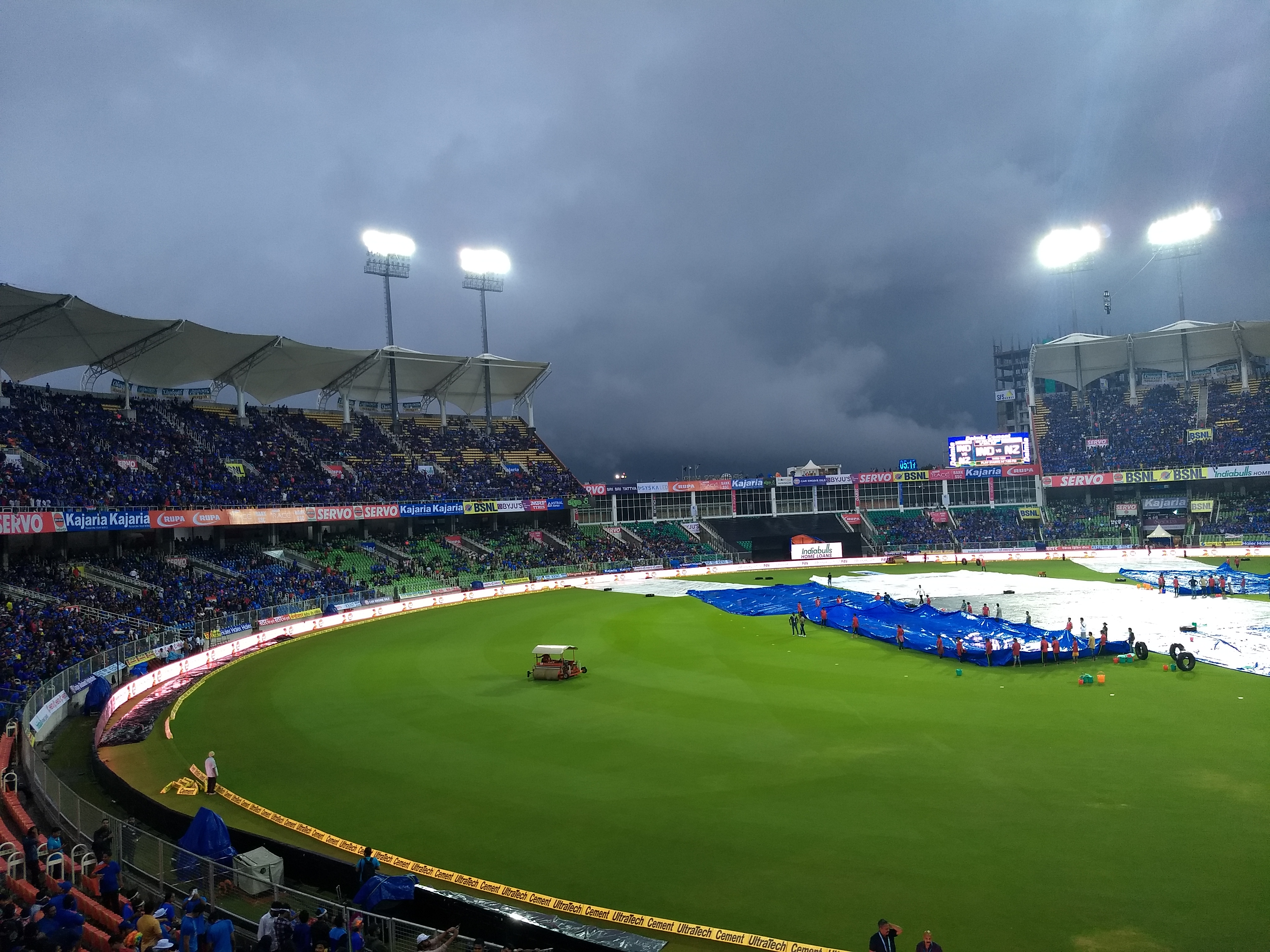
Sports Hub (Greenfield Stadium) during the India vs New Zealand T20

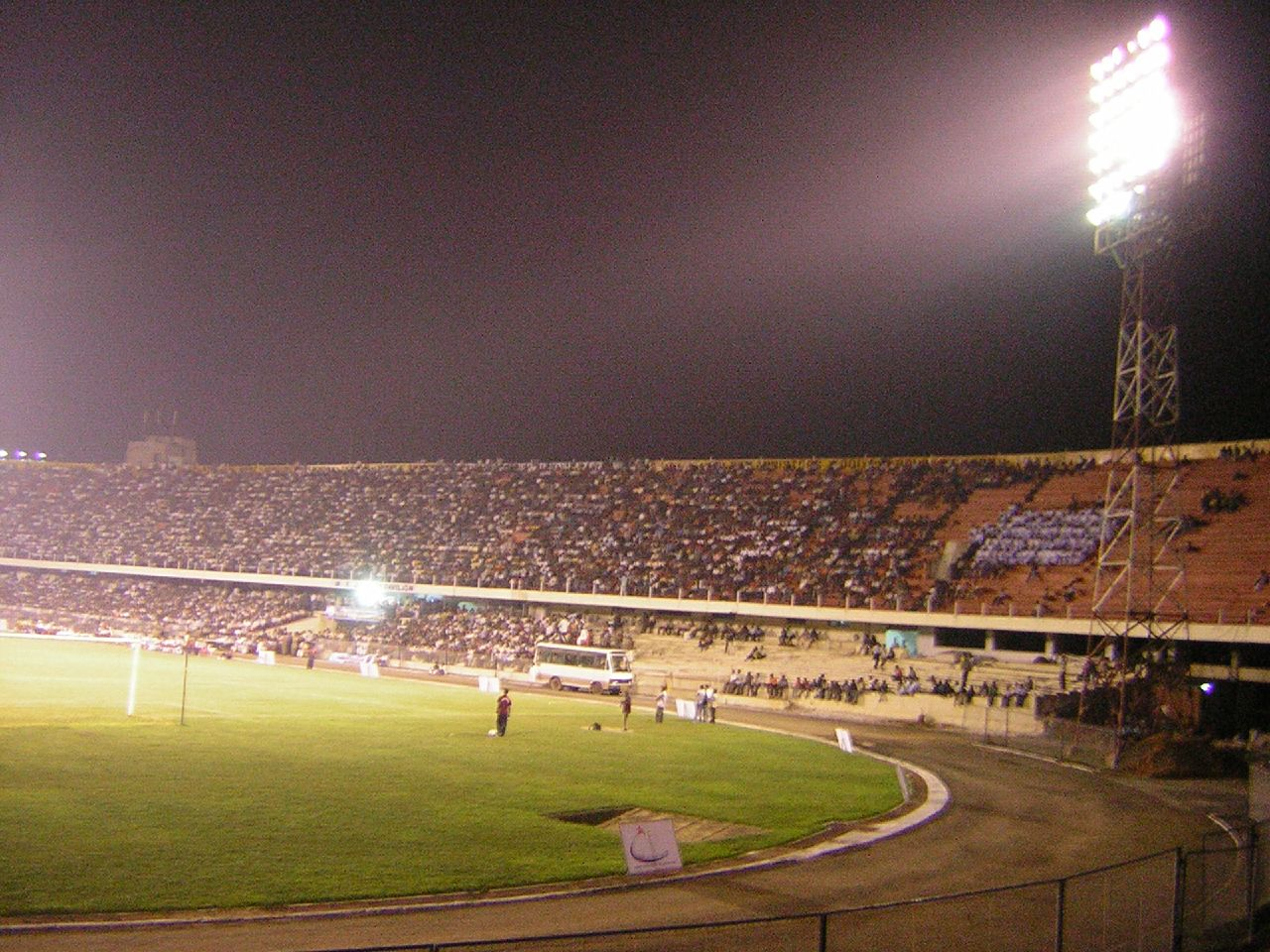
A football match in CSN Stadium

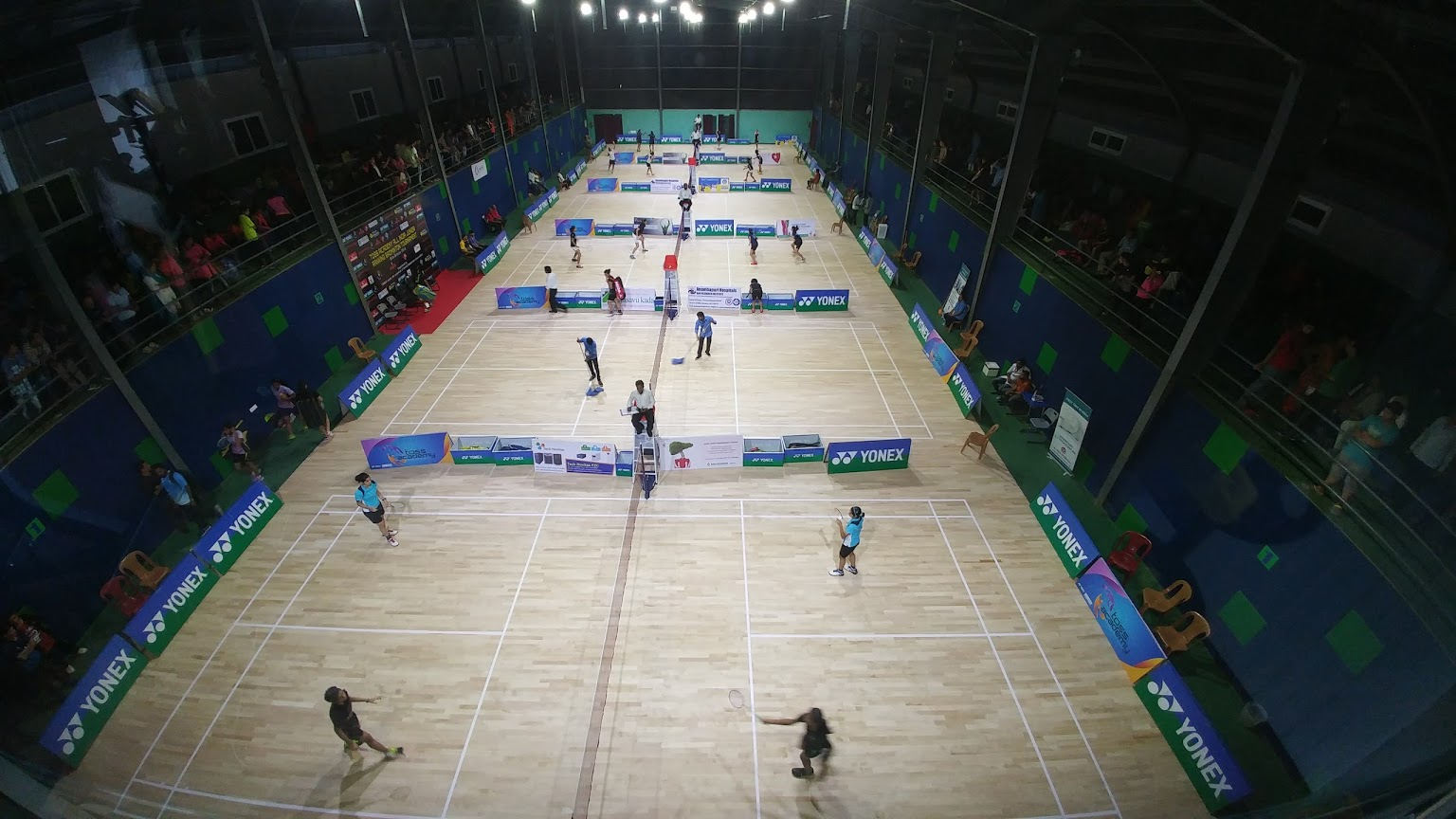
Badminton at TOSS Academy

The most popular sports in Thiruvananthapuram are cricket and football. The city hosted the first international cricket match in Kerala at the University Stadium in 1984. The city also hosted the first Twenty20 International cricket match in Kerala. The Kerala Cricket Association (KCA) is headquartered in Thiruvananthapuram. Prominent cricketers from Thiruvananthapuram include Sanju Samson, Raiphi Gomez, Ryan Ninan, Aneil Nambiar, K. N. Ananthapadmanabhan, Rohan Prem, Udiramala Subramaniam, P. M. K. Mohandas, Bhaskar Pillai, Asha Sobhana and Padmanabhan Prasanth. The Sports Hub, University Stadium, St Xavier's College Ground, KCA Cricket Stadium Mangalapuram, Medical College ground and Vellyani Agricultural College Ground are the main cricket grounds in the city. The Sports Hub, Trivandrum, commonly known as Greenfield Stadium, is one of the largest cricket and football stadiums in India. Thiruvananthapuram hosted the 2015 SAFF Championship at the Greenfield Stadium. SBI Kerala, Titanium FC, KSEB, Kovalam FC and Travancore Royals FC are the major football clubs based in Thiruvananthapuram. Football is usually played in the Greenfield International Stadium (The Sports Hub), Chandrasekharan Nair Stadium and University Stadium. Prominent football players from Thiruvananthapuram include Jobby Justin.

The city has facilities to host most types of sports. Thiruvananthapuram was one of the main venues for the 2015 National Games of India. Athletic competitions are usually held at the University Stadium, Chandrasekharan Nair Stadium and Central Stadium. There is a police-managed Albatros Swimming Pool underneath Chandrasekharan Nair Stadium. The Trivandrum Marathon is a marathon organized by the Trivandrum runners club every year. There will be two main races: a half marathon of 21 km and a full marathon of 42.19 km. A special 2 km fun run is also organized for public participation. Trivand Run is another marathon conducted every January in the city.

Jimmy George Indoor Stadium is a major indoor stadium in the state. It is used for conducting basketball, volleyball, table tennis, gymnastics, aquatics and martial arts. The stadium has the first altitude-simulated training facility in South India, known as Astra. The major sports training and coaching institutions include the Lakshmibai National College of Physical Education (LNCPE), TOSS Academy and the Tenvic Sports Coaching Academy at the Sports Hub.

Basketball tournaments are usually conducted by the schools in the city. Thiruvananthapuram hosted the 61st National Shooting Championship at the Vattiyoorkavu Shooting Range. Surfing is also a popular sport on the beaches. Many surfing and standup paddleboarding tournaments are held in the city. The surf competitions are usually held on Kovalam Beach and Varkala Beach. Paragliding is another adventure sport usually seen on Varkala Beach.

The SAI Trivandrum golf club, established in 1850, is one of the oldest golf courses in India. It is leased to the Sports Authority of India.

Professional sports clubs based in the city
Club	Sport	League	Ground	Established
Trivandrum Tuskers	Cricket	SE Premier League	Trivandrum International Stadium	2016
Trivandrum Royals	Cricket	Kerala Premier League	Trivandrum International Stadium	2015
Thiruvananthapuram Kombans FC	Football	Super Kerala League	Chandrasekharan Nair Stadium	2024
Kovalam FC	Football	Kerala Premier League	Kovalam Ground	2010

== Defence and security forces ==
Defence and Security Forces in Thiruvananthapuram
Force	Description
Maritime Theatre Command	The proposed Maritime Theatre Command is to be headquartered in Thiruvananthapuram, integrating Indian Navy,Indian Air Force, and Indian Army assets to enhance coordinated maritime operations and strengthen India's security in the Indian Ocean Region
Indian Army	The 40th Brigade of the Indian Army is headquartered in Thiruvananthapuram, handling defence operations and security in Kerala and Tamil Nadu.
Indian Air Force	The Southern Air Command (SAC) of the Indian Air Force (IAF) is headquartered in Thiruvananthapuram . It was established on 19 July 1984 to enhance India's air presence over the Indian Ocean.
Indian Navy	The Indian Navy is setting up a strategic center in Thiruvananthapuram , including a Naval Armament Depot and Naval Communication Centre to strengthen coastal security.
Border Security Force (BSF)	The Sector Headquarters (SHQ) BSF Thiruvananthapuram is located in Muttathara, near the international airport, overseeing BSF operations in the region.
Central Reserve Police Force (CRPF)	The CRPF Kerala Sector Headquarters and the 164th Battalion are stationed in Thiruvananthapuram, responsible for maintaining law and order.
Indian Coast Guard	The Indian Coast Guard station in Thiruvananthapuram is responsible for coastal security, surveillance, and maritime operations.
Central Industrial Security Force (CISF)	The CISF unit in Thiruvananthapuram secures key installations, including Thiruvananthapuram International Airport, VSSC, and LPSC.
Sashastra Seema Bal	A battalion headquarters of the Sashastra Seema Bal (SSB), a Central Armed Police Force under the Ministry of Home Affairs, is proposed to be established in Thiruvananthapuram as part of a major defence expansion to strengthen security infrastructure in southern India.
Kerala State Industrial Security Force (KSISF)	The KSISF is a state agency tasked with securing key industrial and infrastructure installations.
Kerala Police	The Thiruvananthapuram City Police Commissionerate serves as the headquarters, overseeing law enforcement across the city.

== See also ==
- List of people from Thiruvananthapuram
- List of Railway Stations in Trivandrum
- Largest Indian cities by GDP
