= Drury (surname) =

Drury is an English surname. Notable people with the surname include:

- Adam Drury (disambiguation), several people
- Alfred Drury (1859–1944), English architectural sculptor
- Allen Drury (1918–1998), American novelist
- Andy Drury (born 1983), English footballer
- Arnold Drury (1912–1995), Australian politician
- Ben Drury (born 1972), British freelance designer
- Brandon Drury (born 1992), American baseball player
- Byron Drury (1815–1888), British naval officer
- Charles Carter Drury (1846–1914), Canadian Royal Navy admiral
- Charles Drury (1912–1991), Canadian soldier, businessman and politician
- Charlotte Drury (born 1996), American trampoline gymnast
- Chris Drury (artist) (born 1948), British environmental artist
- Chris Drury (born 1976), American ice hockey player
- David Drury (disambiguation), several people
- Douglas Drury (1914–1967), Canadian bridge player
- Dru Drury (1725–1804), British entomologist
- Sir Drury Curzon Drury-Lowe (1830–1908), British Army lieutenant-general
- Ernest Charles Drury (1878–1968), Premier of Ontario from 1919 to 1923
- Heber Drury (1819–1905), British botanist and Army officer
- Henry Drury (disambiguation), several people
- Herb Drury (1895–1965), Canadian ice hockey player
- Herbert Drury (gymnast) (1883–1936), British gymnast
- Horace Bookwalter Drury (1888–1968), American economist
- Jack Drury (born 2000), American ice hockey player
- James Drury (1934–2020), American actor
- John Drury (disambiguation), several people
- Joseph Drury (1750–1834), headmaster of Harrow school 1785–1805
- Keith Drury (theologian) (born 1945), American professor of religion
- Maurice O'Connor Drury (1907–1976), English psychiatrist and student of Ludwig Wittgenstein
- Martin Drury (born 1938), British director of the National Trust 1996–2001
- Morley Drury (1903–1989), Canadian American footballer
- Nevill Drury (1947–2013), English editor and publisher
- Newton B. Drury (1889–1978), fourth director of the U.S. National Park Service
- Nigel Drury (1911–1984), Australian politician
- Patrick Drury, Irish actor
- Peter Drury, British television sports commentator
- Robert Drury (disambiguation), several people
- Shadia Drury (born 1950), Canadian academic
- Shane Drury (1979–2006), professional American rodeo bull rider
- Stephen Drury (disambiguation), several people
- Susanna Drury (1698–1770), Irish painter
- Ted Drury (born 1971), American ice hockey player
- Thomas Drury (disambiguation), several people
- Timothy Drury (born 1961), British rock musician
- Tom Drury (born 1956), American writer
- William Drury (1527–1579), English statesman
- William O'Bryen Drury (died 1811), senior officer of the Royal Navy
- William Price Drury (1861–1949), Royal Marine Light Infantry officer, novelist and playwright

== See also ==
- Drewry (surname)
- Dury (disambiguation)
