= Drury =

Drury may refer to:

== Places ==
- Drury, New Zealand, a town
- Drury, a village near Buckley, Flintshire, Wales
- Drury, Kansas, United States, an unincorporated community
- Drury, a village in Florida, Massachusetts, United States
- Drury, Missouri, United States, an unincorporated community
- Drury Inlet, British Columbia, Canada
- Drury Rock, Antarctica

== People ==
- Drury (surname)
- Drury A. Hinton (1839–1909), American lawyer, politician and Virginia Supreme Court of Appeals judge
- Drury Lacy Jr., third president of Davidson College (1855–1860)

== Other uses ==
- Drury University, formerly Drury College, Springfield, Missouri
- Drury High School, North Adams, Massachusetts
- Drury Hotels operator of Drury Inns
- Drury Lane, a famous street in the Westend of London
- Drury Run, a river in Pennsylvania
- Drury convention, used in bridge
- HMS Drury (K316), a Captain-class frigate
- Newton B. Drury Scenic Parkway located in Redwood National and State Parks
- Drury Walker, alter ego of the DC Comics character Killer Moth
