= John Drury =

John Drury may refer to:

- John Drury (Canon of Windsor) (died 1446), Medieval English priest
- John Drury (Mayor of Sandwich) (died 1457)
- John Drury (television anchor) (1927–2007), American television anchorman and activist for ALS research
- John Drury (dean of Christ Church) (born 1936), Anglican priest
- John W. Drury (born 1952), investment banker from Australia
- John Drury (social psychologist) (fl. 1992–present), lecturer on social psychology at the University of Sussex
- John Drury (cricketer) (1874–1919), English cricketer
