= Herbert Drury =

Herbert Drury may refer to:

- Herbert Drury (gymnast) (1883–1936), British Olympic gymnast
- Herb Drury (Herbert Joseph Drury, 1895–1965), Canadian-born American ice hockey player

== See also ==
- Drury (disambiguation)
