= David Drury =

David Drury may refer to:

- David Drury (cricketer) (born 1961), former English cricketer
- David Drury (fencer) (1888–1946), British fencer
- David Drury (musician) (born 1961), musician in Sydney, Australia
- David Drury (director), British director of films and television series
