= Kottayam coin hoard =

Imperial Roman gold coin treasure trove in Kerala, India

Kottayam hoard
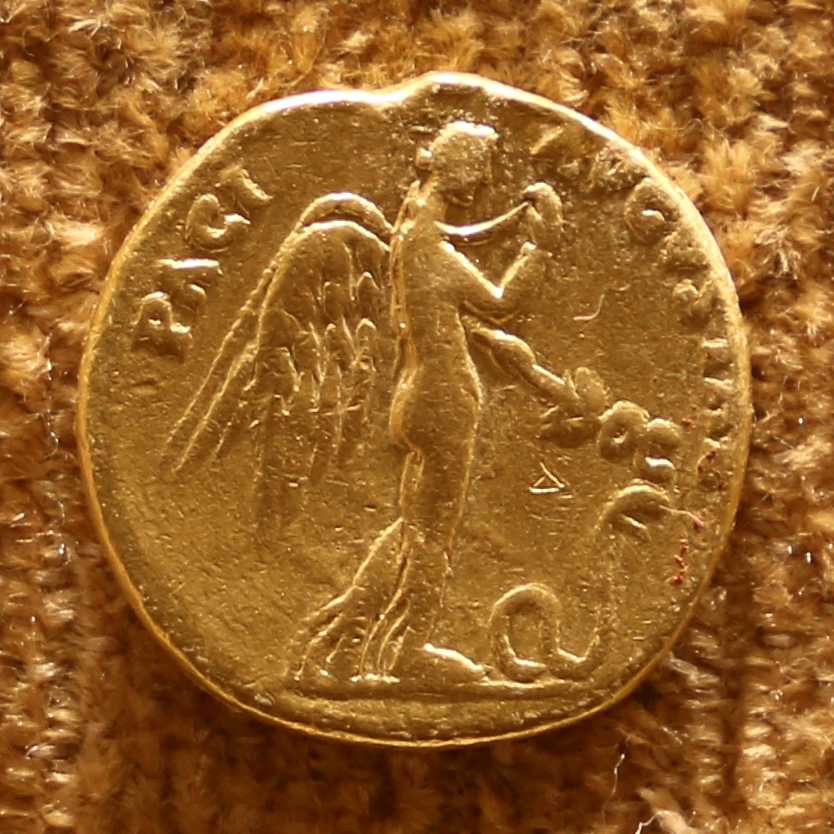
- Aureus of Claudius, reverse depicting the goddess Nemesis, Government Museum, Chennai
- Material: Gold
- Size: 74 surviving coins, possibly hundreds with maximum 8000 coins
- Created: 211-217 AD
- Discovered: Kottayam (present-day Kerala, India)
- Present location: Government Museum, Chennai, Tamil Nadu, India
- Identification: 18598
- Culture: Roman Empire
- https://chre.ashmus.ox.ac.uk/hoard/18598

The Kottayam coin hoard is a Roman coin hoard consisting of a cache of aurei discovered in the vicinity of Kottayam, Kannur (Cannanore), in present-day northern Kerala, southern India.

Discovered by locals around 1846/47, many of the coins were processed and melted by local jewelers, although surviving specimens were acquired by the maharaja (the ruler) of the neighbouring state of Travancore. The surviving specimens, numbering 80–90, with 74 documented aurei were split between the Government Museum, Madras, The Asiatic Society or the Indian Museum, Kolkata, and possibly some private collections. The most recent coin, an aureus minted by Caracalla, suggests that the hoard was deposited sometime between 211 and 217 AD.

== Discovery ==
The coins from the Kottayam hoard were first studied by numismatist Robert Caldwell (1851).

In the early 1850s, in a report called Remarks on Some Lately Discovered Roman Gold Coins, penned by Captain Heber Drury, a cache of Roman aurei, many of which were in uncirculated condition, was found in Kannur (Malabar District, Madras Presidency) bearing the image of Augustus, circulating amongst the locals and laborers around the town in 1847. They were traded for anywhere between 1–14 rupees or bartered away for a day's worth of rice. Jewelers and wealthier locals who noted the high purity of the coins melted some of them for jewelry.

Though the exact provenance of the coin deposit was heavily kept secret, further inquiry of the finds traced the discoverers to a Saint Thomas Christian community in Kottayam who were gold panning along the Valapattanam River. While soil was getting cleared away on a small hill by the Arabian Sea along the river, a brass/bronze vessel containing mostly gold coins, along with spilled coins, was discovered. The amount was described as "no less than five cooly-loads" (which theoretically equates to approximately 8000 aurei).

== Coins ==
Specimens from the Kottayam find appear to have remained available in local markets for many years, both before and after the hoard attracted scholarly attention.

Some of the surviving coins that were found ultimately went into the collections of Marthanda Varma II, the ruler of the neighbouring princely state of Travancore, and Travancore Resident Major General William Cullen, of which 80–90 specimens were catalogued. With entry into the Coin Hoards of the Roman Empire database by the University of Oxford, 74 individual specimens are attributed, out of the estimated "hundreds" recovered from the brass vessel and its spillage. The Kottayam coins, which ended up in the Indian Museum, Calcutta, after being originally donated to the Asiatic Society of Bengal by Resident Cullen, were eventually lost.

It is unclear whether any of the coins were slashed (deliberately marked with a chisel), but there is little evidence to indicate that they were.

Catalogue of the Aurei from the Kottayam Hoard
Portrait	Mint	Quantity	Roman Imperial Coinage Variants
Augustus	Lugdunum	5	RIC II 172, 198, 200, 206ff, 225
Augustus	unmarked	4	
Gaius Marius	Rome	3	RIC II 13, 17, 25
Tiberius	unmarked	25	
Tiberius	Lugdunum	3	RIC II 3, 23, 25, 27, 29
Claudius	Rome	12	RIC II 1, 11, 15, 25, 27, 31, 33, 40, 51, 54, 63, 80
Drusus the Elder	Rome	3	RIC II 71, 76, 78
Antonia Minor	Rome	2	RIC II, 65, 67
Nero	Rome	9	RIC II 1, 6, 14(?), 19, 21(?), 23, 25(?), 27(?), 35
Nero	unmarked	6	
Divus Claudius (Nero)	Rome	1	RIC II 4
Caracalla	unmarked	1	
Total		74	

== Significance ==
The Kottayam hoard is one of the largest discovery of Roman coins in southern India. In addition to other finds along India and Kerala, it is seen by economists as an attestation to the value of Roman currency in Indo-Roman trade relations, part of a rich array of additional finds in the region, ranging from Arab to Chinese coinage. Additional Roman coins attesting to Kerala's history as a trading hub were found in villages and towns such as Eyyal, Poonjar, and Valuvally.
