= Strong notrump after passing =

Strong notrump after passing (SNAP) is a bridge bidding convention originated by Jeremy Flint and Tony Priday and is a one notrump (1NT) bid by a passed hand in response to a one-level opening by his partner.

Similar to the Drury convention, SNAP is intended to keep the contract at a low level when it is possible that partner has opened with a light or minimum hand in third or fourth seat. While a 1NT response would typically show 6-9 (or 6-10) high card points (HCP) in most Standard American partnership agreements, the SNAP 1NT response instead shows a relatively balanced hand with 9-12 (or 10-12) HCP and no five-card major that could have been bid at the one-level.

When using SNAP, a 2NT response shows a balanced limit jump raise in opener's suit.

== Limitations ==
Responding hands containing 6-8 points are problematic, especially if partner opens in spades. Some 6 point hands are passed and some 8 point hands are bid at the two-level.

SNAP gives an advantage in a partscore deal and is therefore more suited to competitive bidding in Matchpoint scoring. The risk of obliging a Pass or overbid holding 6-8 points deters some players from adopting the convention while others favor it owing to the frequency of occurrence.

== See also ==
- Drury convention
