= Henry Drury =

Henry Drury may refer to:

- Henry Drury (educator) (1778–1841), English educator, classical scholar, and friend of Lord Byron
- Henry Drury (priest) (1812–1863), Archdeacon of Wilts, England and Chaplain to the Speaker of the House of Commons
- Henry Drury (fl. 1578), owner of Lawshall Hall
- Henry Drury (figure skater) in 2014 British Figure Skating Championships
- Henry Drury, Sheriff of Norfolk and Suffolk in 15th century
