= Heber Drury =

British army officer

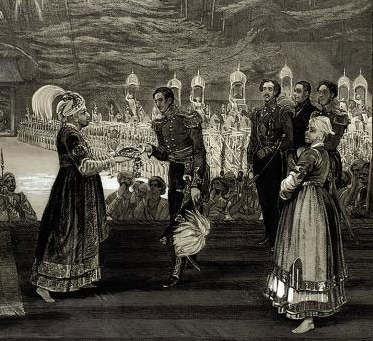
Part of a sketch by F.C. Lewis depicting Col. Heber Drury standing behind General William Cullen handing a letter of thanks from Queen Victoria to Uthram Thirunal Marthanda Varma on 27 November 1851

Colonel Heber Drury (4 March 1819 – 30 October 1905) was a British army officer who worked in India and contributed to botany in his spare time. He published two books and several articles on botany and is commemorated in the name of the only peninsular Indian species of slipper orchid in the genus Paphiopedilum, P. druryi, which he collected in the hills of Agastyamalai.

== Biography ==
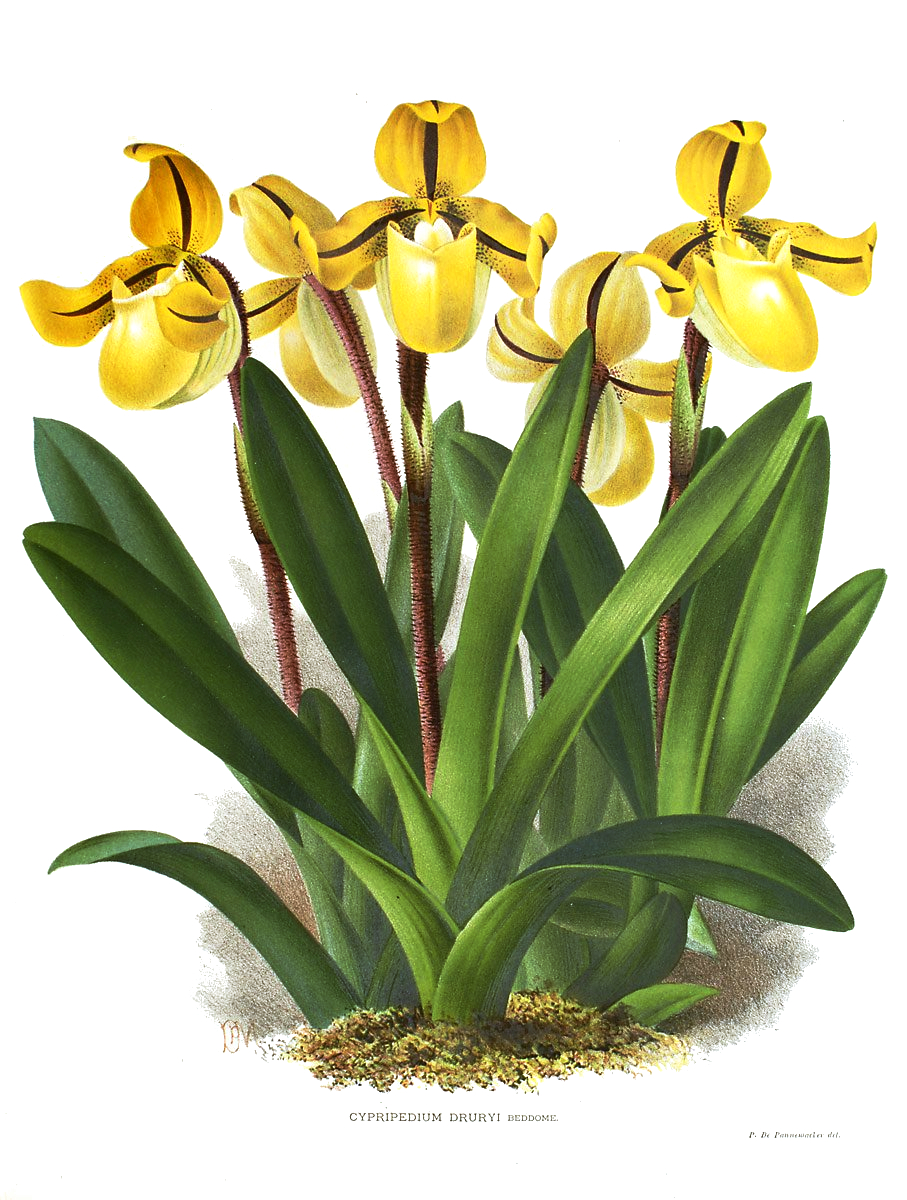
Paphiopedilum druryi named by Beddome

Drury was the fourth son of Rev. Henry Joseph Thomas Drury, of Harrow, and Ann Caroline Tayler. He was born on 4 March 1819 (some sources give 22 May 1819 which may be the date of Christening). His brother B.H. Drury was later a Fellow of Gonville and Caius College. Educated at Harrow, he became a cadet and joined as an ensign in the Madras Native Infantry in August 1837. He was a Lieutenant in the 45th Native Infantry in Travancore on 19 June 1838 and was commissioned Captain on 23 January 1846 and joined the Escort of the British Resident at Travancore in 1846 and from 1852 to 1862 served as assistant to the Resident, General William Cullen. During that tenure as resident, he reported on the discovery of the Kottayam Coin Hoard, a cache of Julio-Claudian aurei discovered in Kottayam district in 1847. In 1857 he was appointed to take charge and educate some princes in the Presidency of Madras. With the outbreak of the Sepoy mutiny, he was placed in the Madras Staff Corps where he commanded the Nair Brigade in Travancore consisting of two infantry regiments, sixty troopers and guns. In 1863 he became Lt. Colonel and in 1867 he was promoted to Colonel and retired in the same year.

In his spare time Drury studied plants and wrote The Useful Plants of India; with Notices of their Uses in Medicine, Commerce, and the Arts and the Handbook of the Indian Flora in three volumes (dedicated to the Travancore King Rama Varma). He also published some historical letters on the Dutch in Malabar and on hunting in Reminiscences of Life and Sport in Southern India apart from papers in the Madras Journal of Literature and Science.

Drury married Annie Playfair Ross (died 1859) (daughter of John Ross, Madras) in Trivandrum 29 April 1852 and had five children including a namesake son born in 1854. He married Elizabeth Sarah Court in 1861 at St Mary's Berkshire and had seven children. He died in 1905 at Holton, Mayfield.

The standard author abbreviation Drury is used to indicate this person as the author when citing a botanical name.
