= Thiruvananthapuram Zoo =

Thiruvananthapuram Zoo and Botanical Gardens
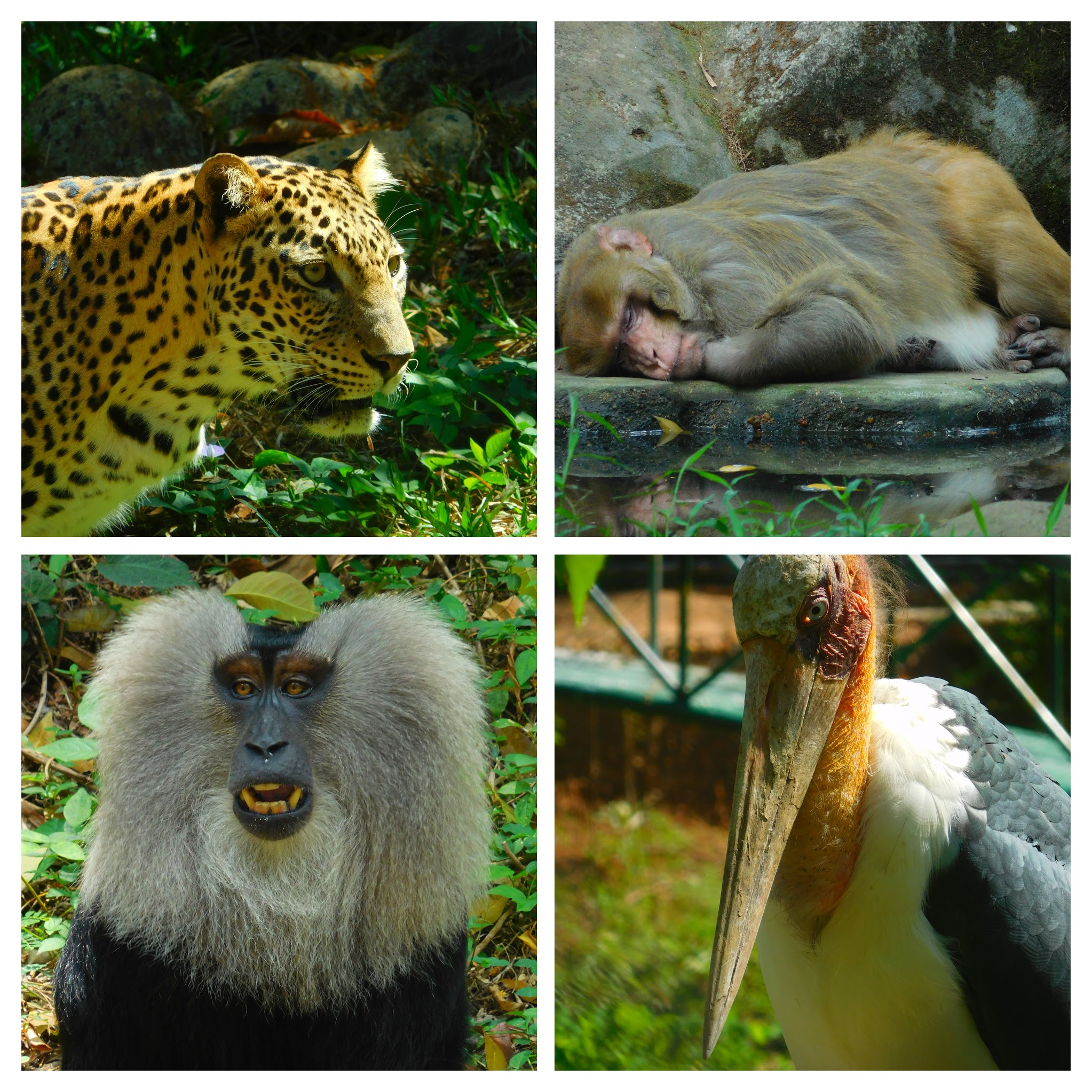
- A Collage of animals at Thiruvananthapuram zoo. Counter clockwise from top : Indian Leopard, Rhesus Monkey, Lesser Adjutant, Lion Tailed Macaque.
- Interactive map of Thiruvananthapuram Zoo and Botanical Gardens
- 8.512°N 76.955°E
- Date opened: 1857
- Location: Thiruvananthapuram, Kerala, India
- Land area: 55 acres (22 ha)
- No. of species: 82
- Memberships: CZA
- Website: https://www.museumandzoo.kerala.gov.in/

The Thiruvananthapuram Zoo is zoo located in the city of Thiruvananthapuram, the capital of Kerala, India. It occupies 55 acres (22 ha) of woodland, lakes, and lawns. Opened in 1857, it is one of the oldest zoos in India.

== History ==
Thiruvananthapuram Zoo is one of the oldest zoos in India. Similarly the Museum and Botanical Gardens are also one of the oldest of their kind in the country. Swathi Thirunal Rama Varma (1816–1846), the ruler of Travancore during 1830–1846, was the visionary behind the establishment of the Thiruvananthapuram Museum and Zoo. He had a broad variety of animals, including elephants in his horse breeding centre. In the Trivandrum, stables he incorporated a menagerie and kept tigers, panthers cheetahs, deer, bears and a lioness there. It was however left to his brother Uthram Thirunal Marthanda Varma and the then British Resident General Cullen which resulted in the establishment of Napier Museum and Zoo in Thiruvananthapuram. A committee was formed in 1855 with the Maharaja of Travancore as Patron, General Cullen as president, The Elaya Raja as vice president and Mr. Allen Brown as Secretary of the Committee and the Director of Museum. The Museum was thrown open to the Public in September 1857. But the Museum by itself could not attract the people much, and therefore a Zoo and a park were started in 1859. The zoo was originally built with the typical iron-barred cages prevalent at the time, and was designed for recreational purposes, but with increased loss of forest and wildlife due to human development, the goal of the Zoo has changed from recreation to conservation.

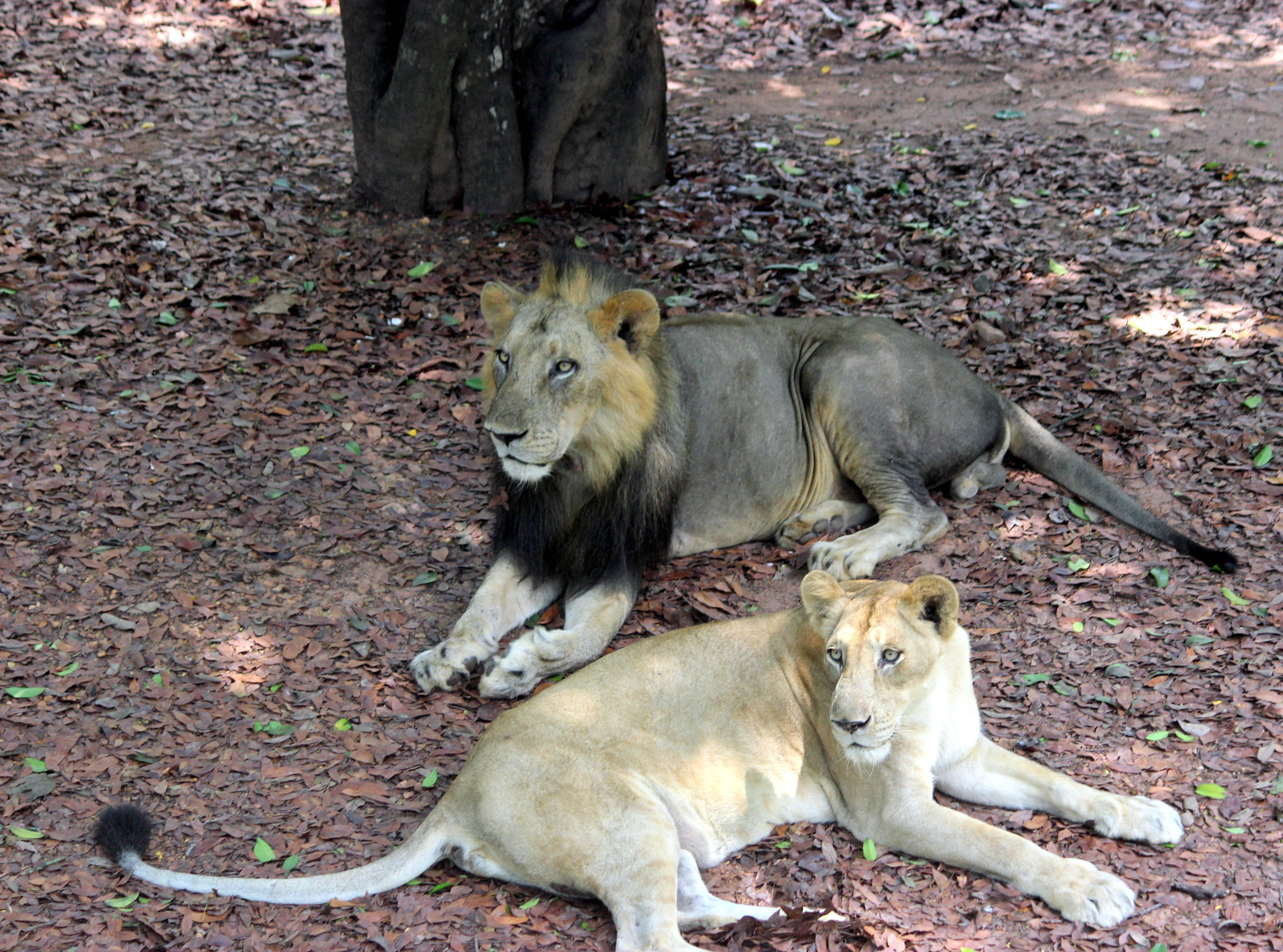
Asiatic lions in the zoo

A modernization project started in 1995, aims to gradually replace the old enclosures with spacious naturalistic enclosures. The state government of Kerala is undertaking this renovation with financial and technical help from the Central Zoo Authority.

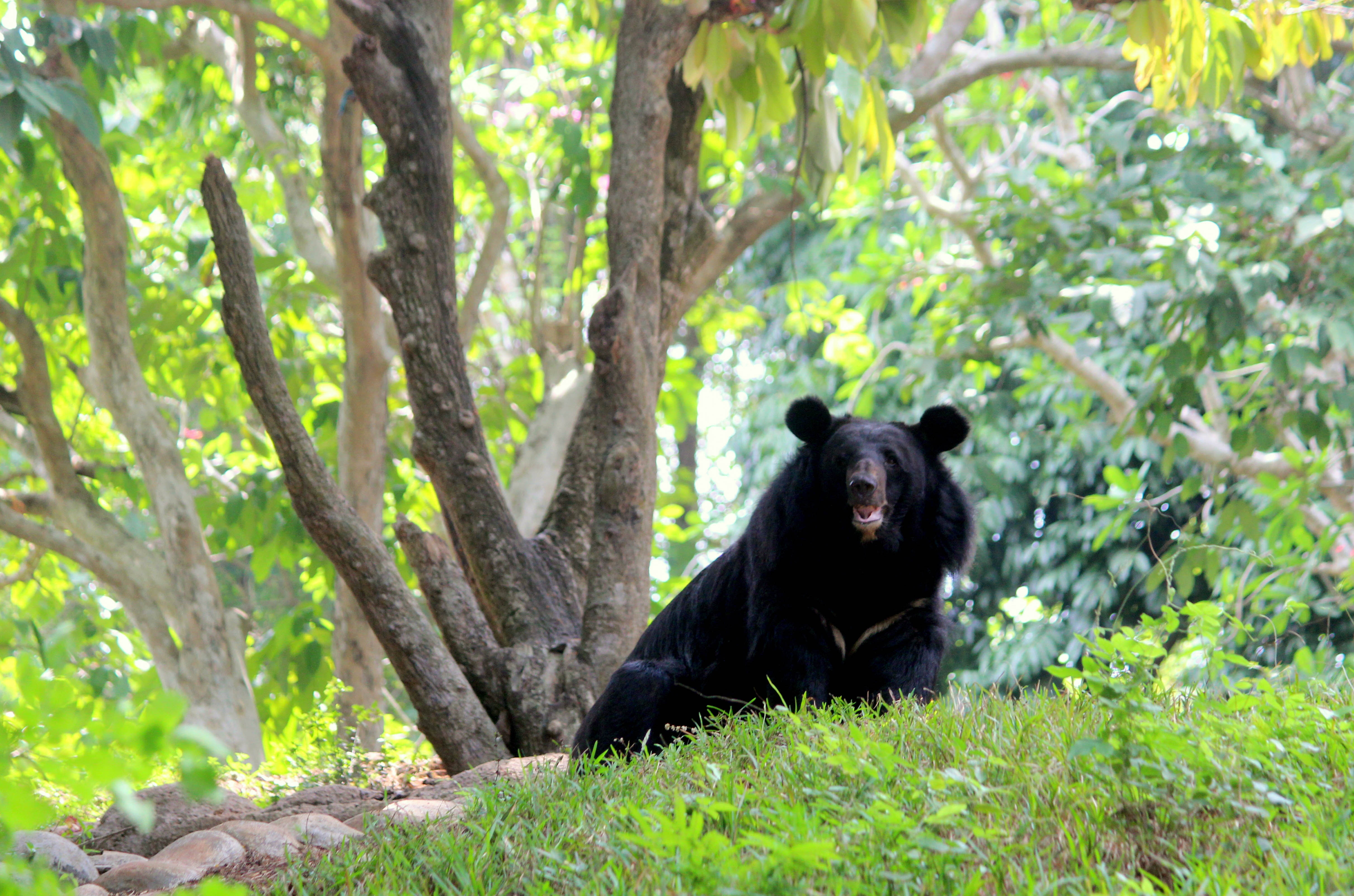
Asian black bear in the zoo

== Mammals ==
The Thiruvananthapuram Zoo is home to 82 species from around the world. Indigenous species at the zoo include Spotted deer, Sambar deer, Indian hog deer, Swamp deer, Striped hyena, Nilgai, Smooth coated otter, golden jackal, Sloth bear, lion-tailed macaque, Nilgiri langur, Gaur, Black buck, Indian rhinoceros, Asiatic lion, royal Bengal tiger, white tiger and leopard, Animals from Africa include hippos, zebras and Cape buffalos.

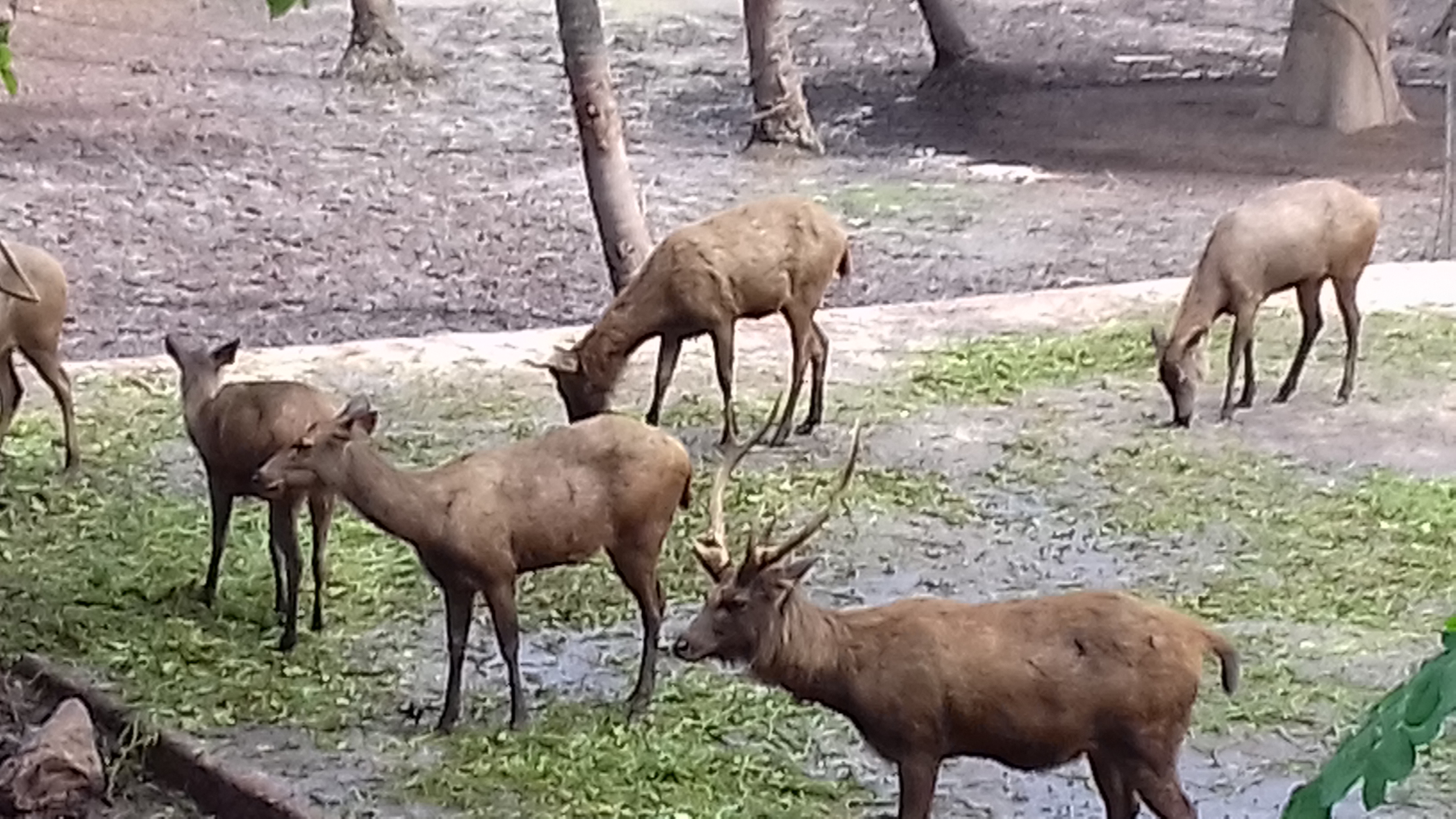
Deer in the zoo

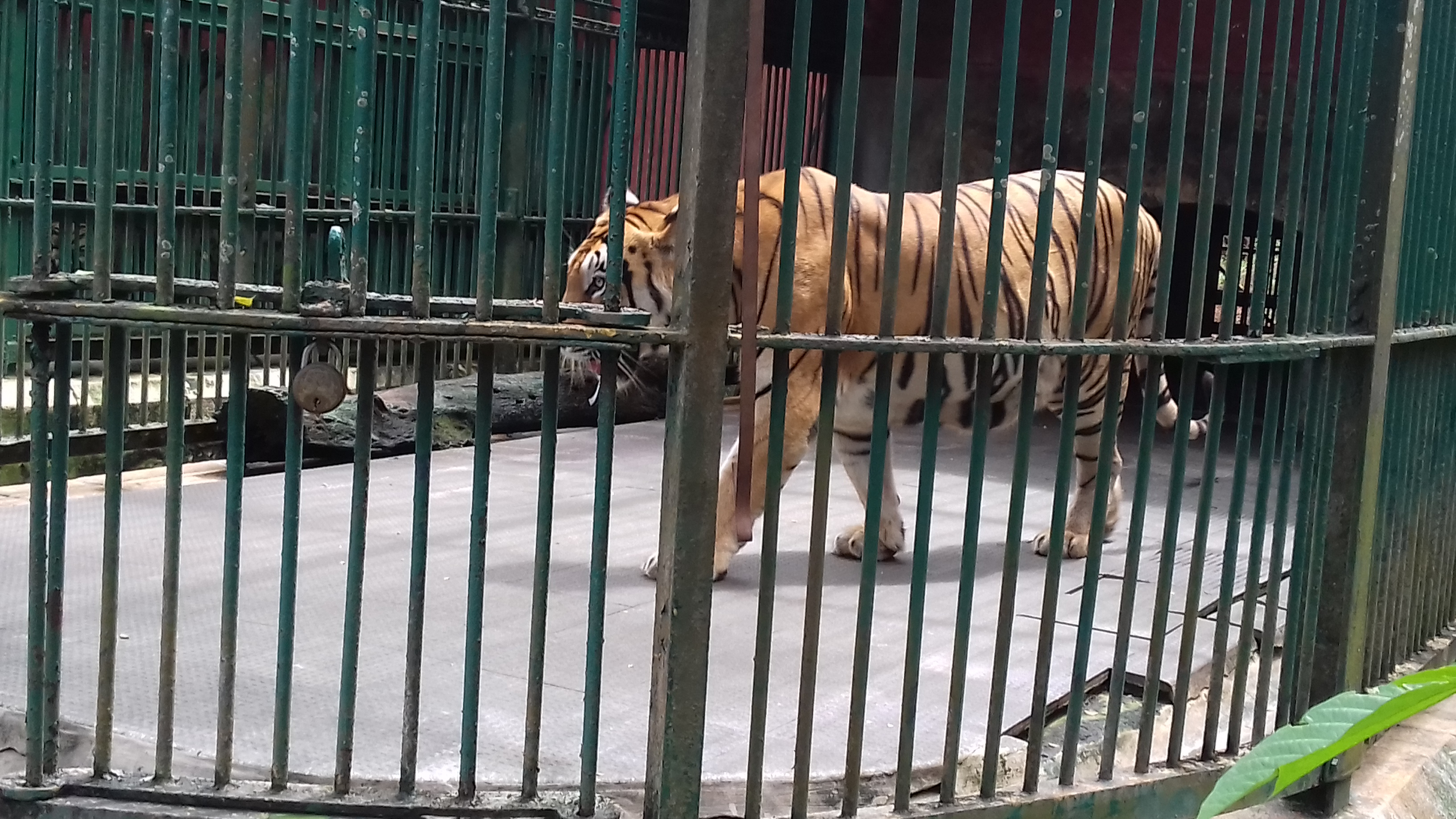
Tiger in the zoo

== Birds ==
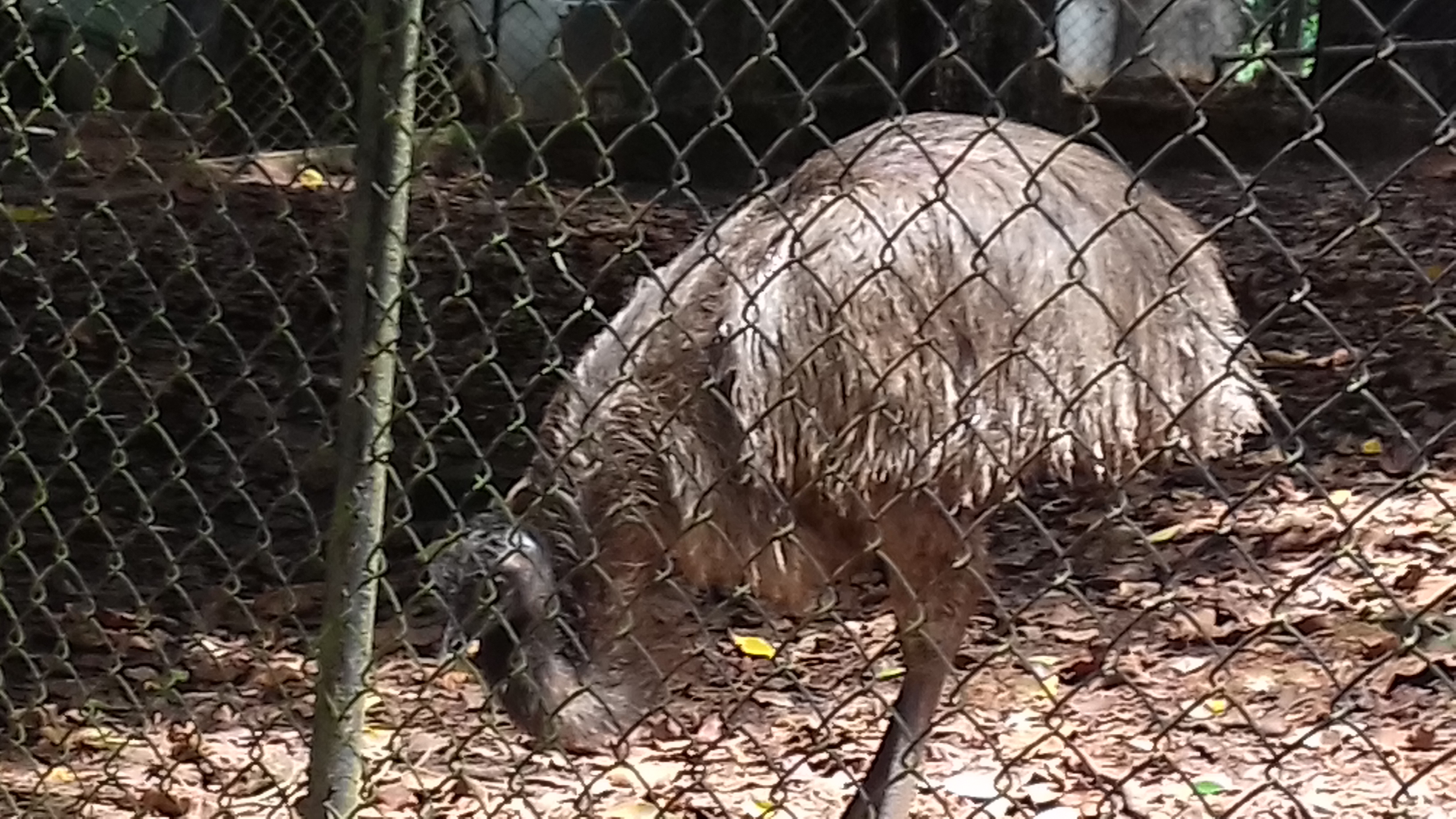
Emu in the zoo

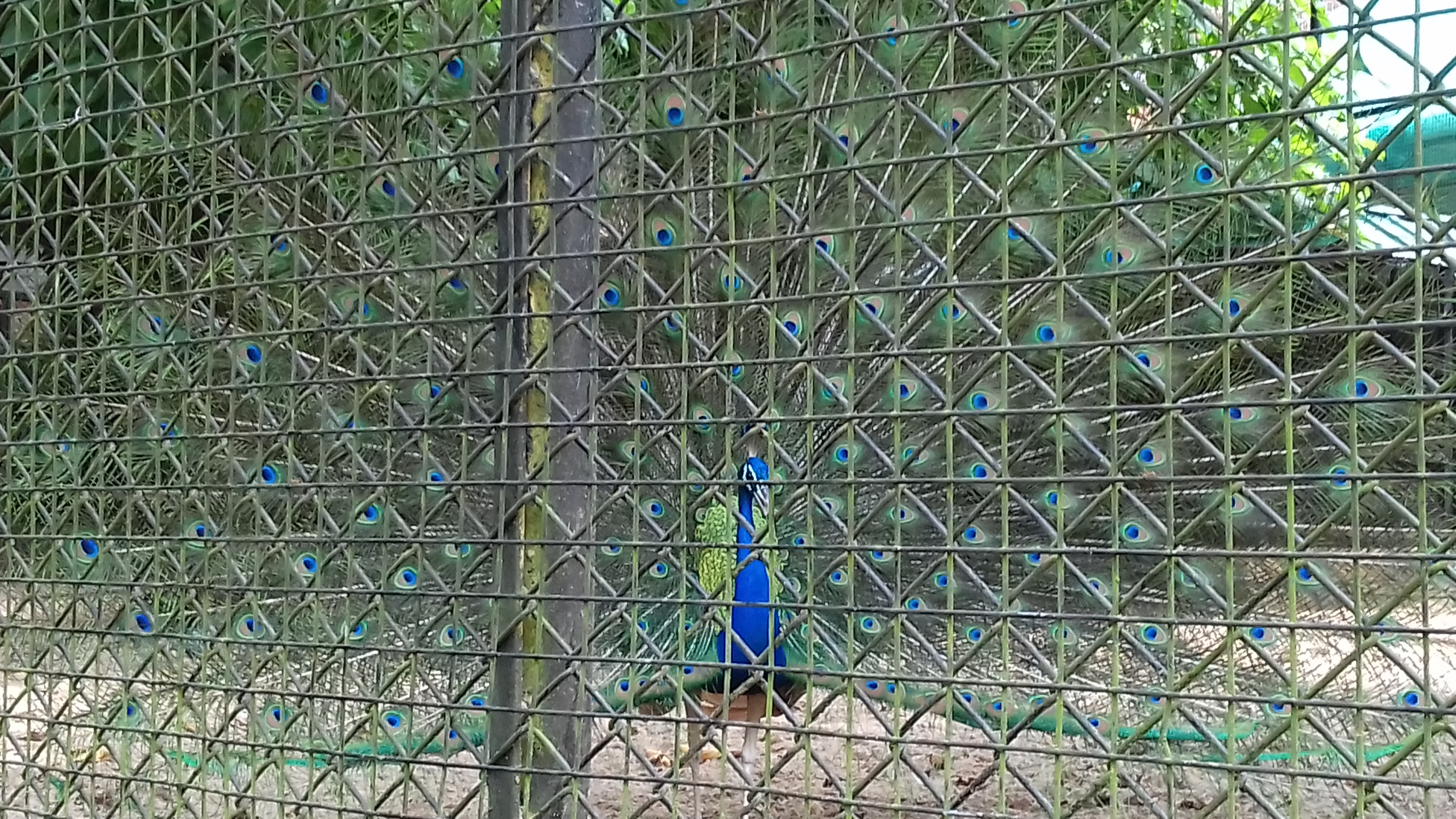
Peacock in the zoo

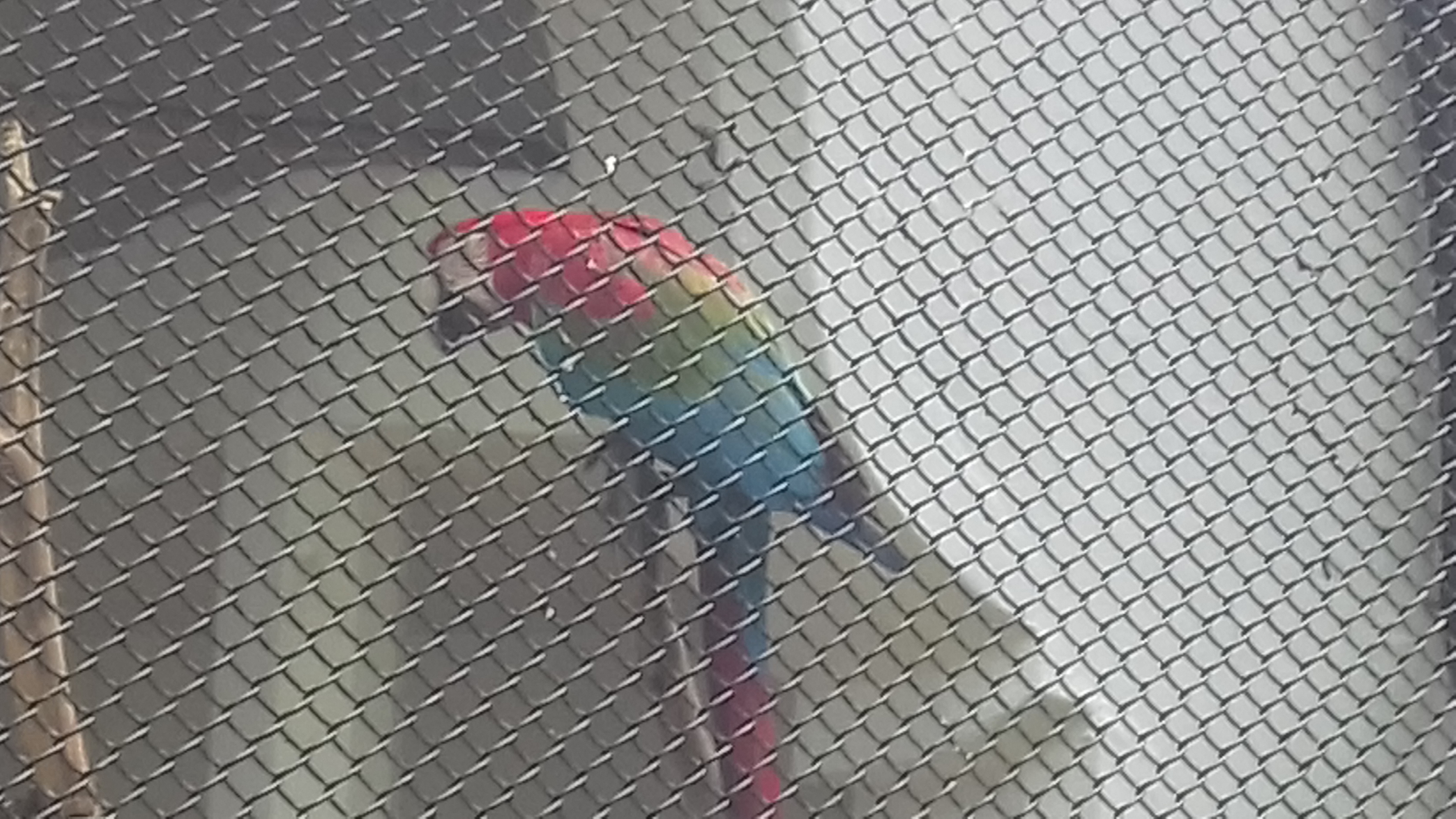
Green Winged Macaw in the zoo

- Ostrich
- Scarlet macaw
- Green-winged macaw
- Indian peafowl
- White spoonbill
- Greater flamingo
- Sulfur-crested cockatoo
- Common crane
- White-necked crane
- Black-necked crane
- Grey heron
- White ibis
- Blossom headed parakeet
- Rose-ringed parakeet
- Alexandrine parakeet
- Mustached parakeet
- Gray pelican
- Rosy pelican
- Silver pheasant
- Ring-necked pheasant
- Rock dove
- Adjutant stork
- Painted stork
- White stork
- White necked stork
- Black-necked stork
- Cinereous vulture
- King vulture
- White-backed vulture
- Pariah kite
- Brahminy kite
- Emu

== Reptiles ==
The zoo also includes a snake enclosure called 'The Reptile House', which exhibits both venomous and non-venomous snakes. It also houses green Anacondas too.

- Green Anaconda
- Reticulated Python
- Gharial
- Mugger crocodile
- Spectacled caiman
- Monitor lizard
- Bamboo pit viper
- Indian cobra
- Indian rock python
- Rat snake
- Russell's viper
- Checkered keelback
- King cobra
- Red sandboa
- Green tree snake
- Indian flapshell turtle
- Indian black turtle
- Crowned river turtle
- Travancore tortoise

== Gallery ==
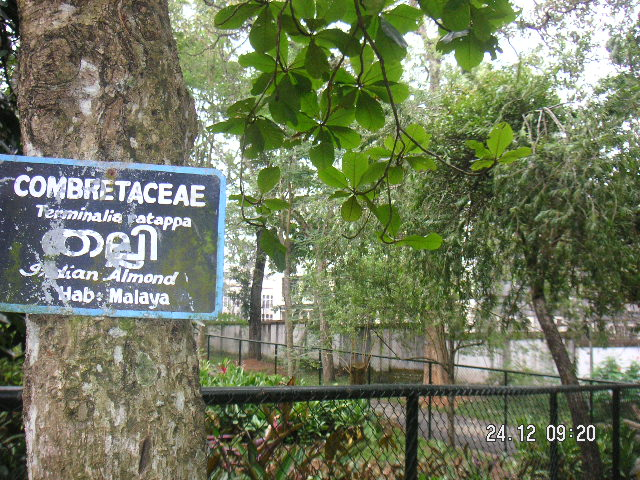
Thiruvananthapuram Zoo Campus

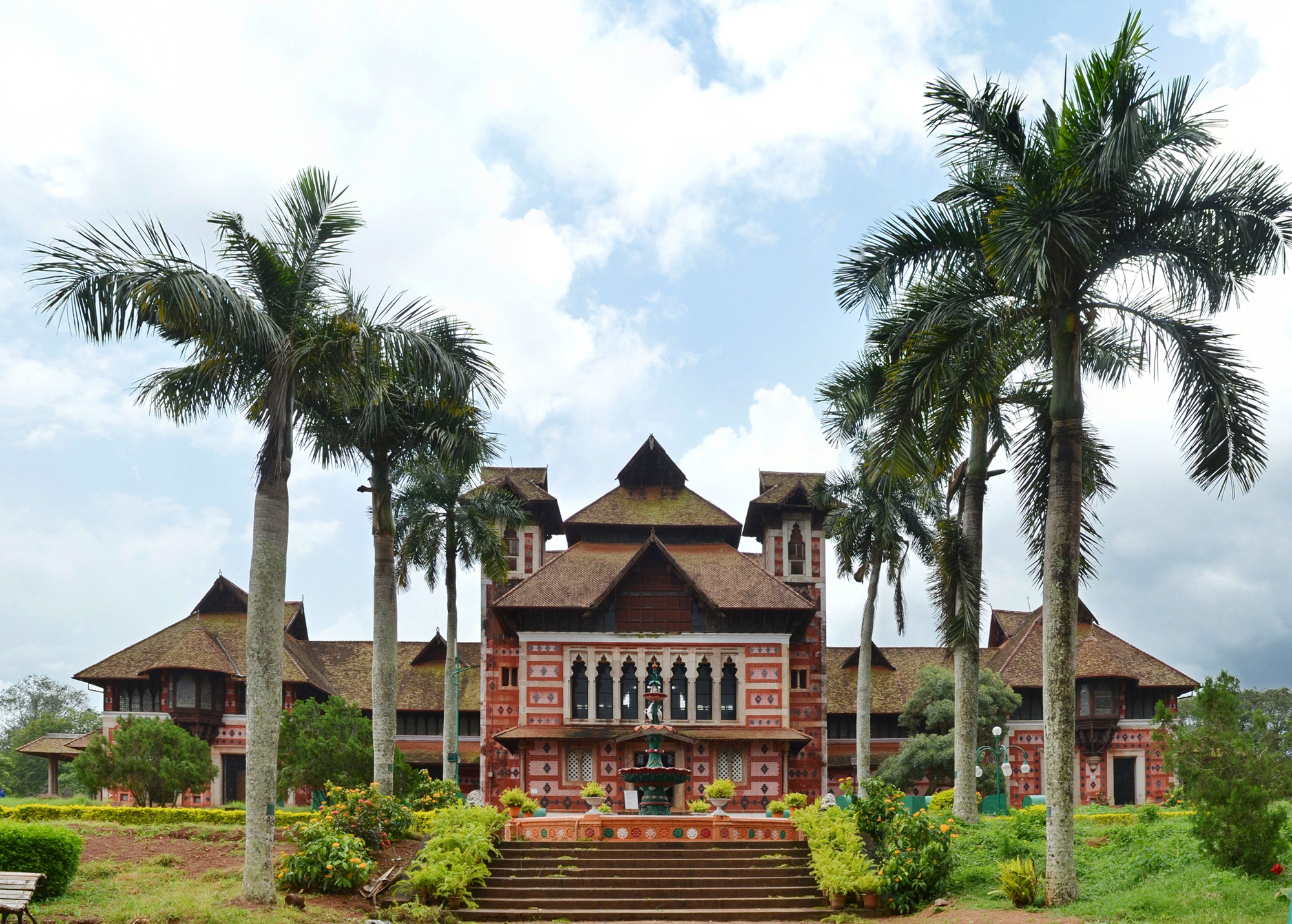
Napier Museum Thiruvananthapuram

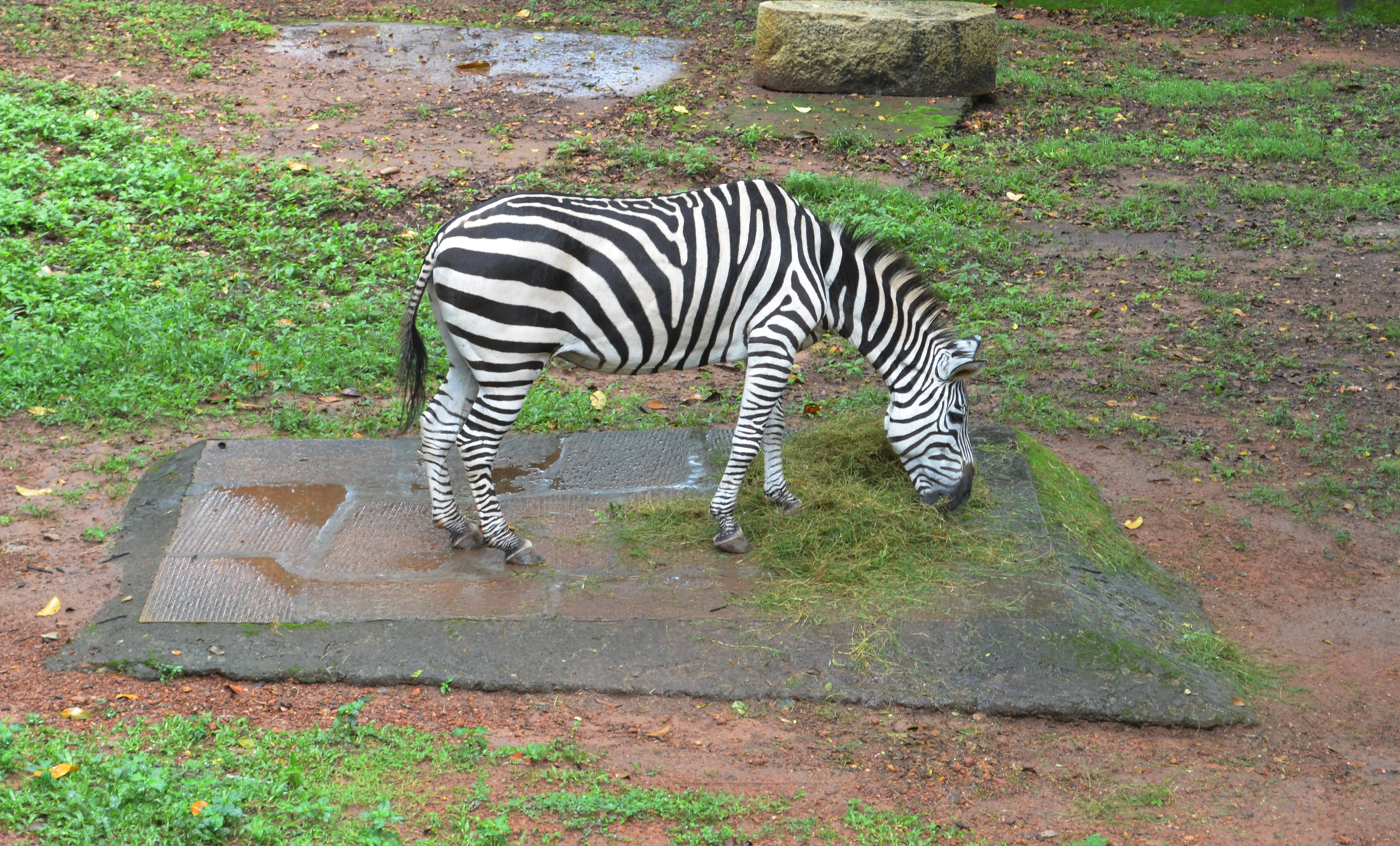
Zebra in the zoo

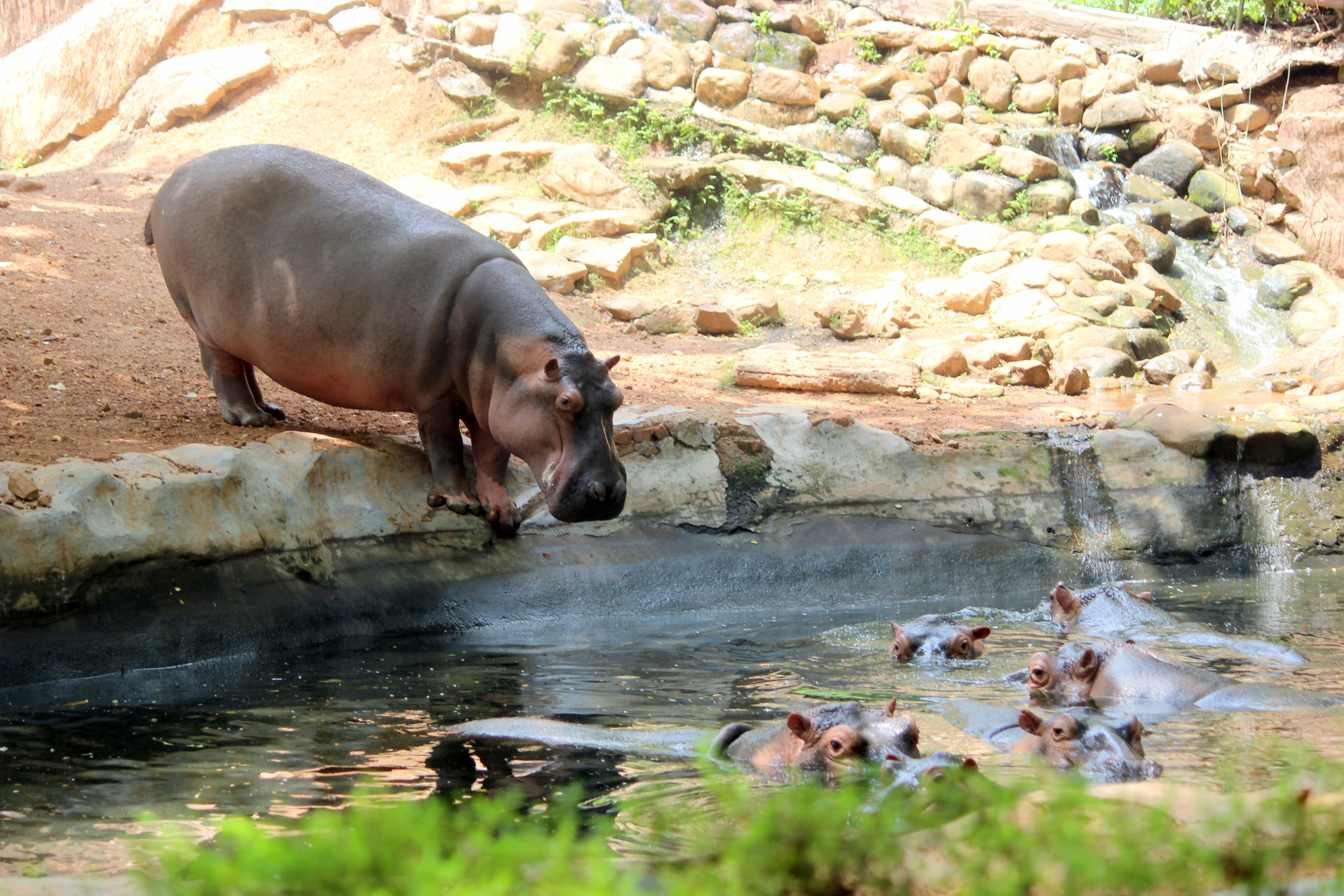
Hippopotamus in the zoo

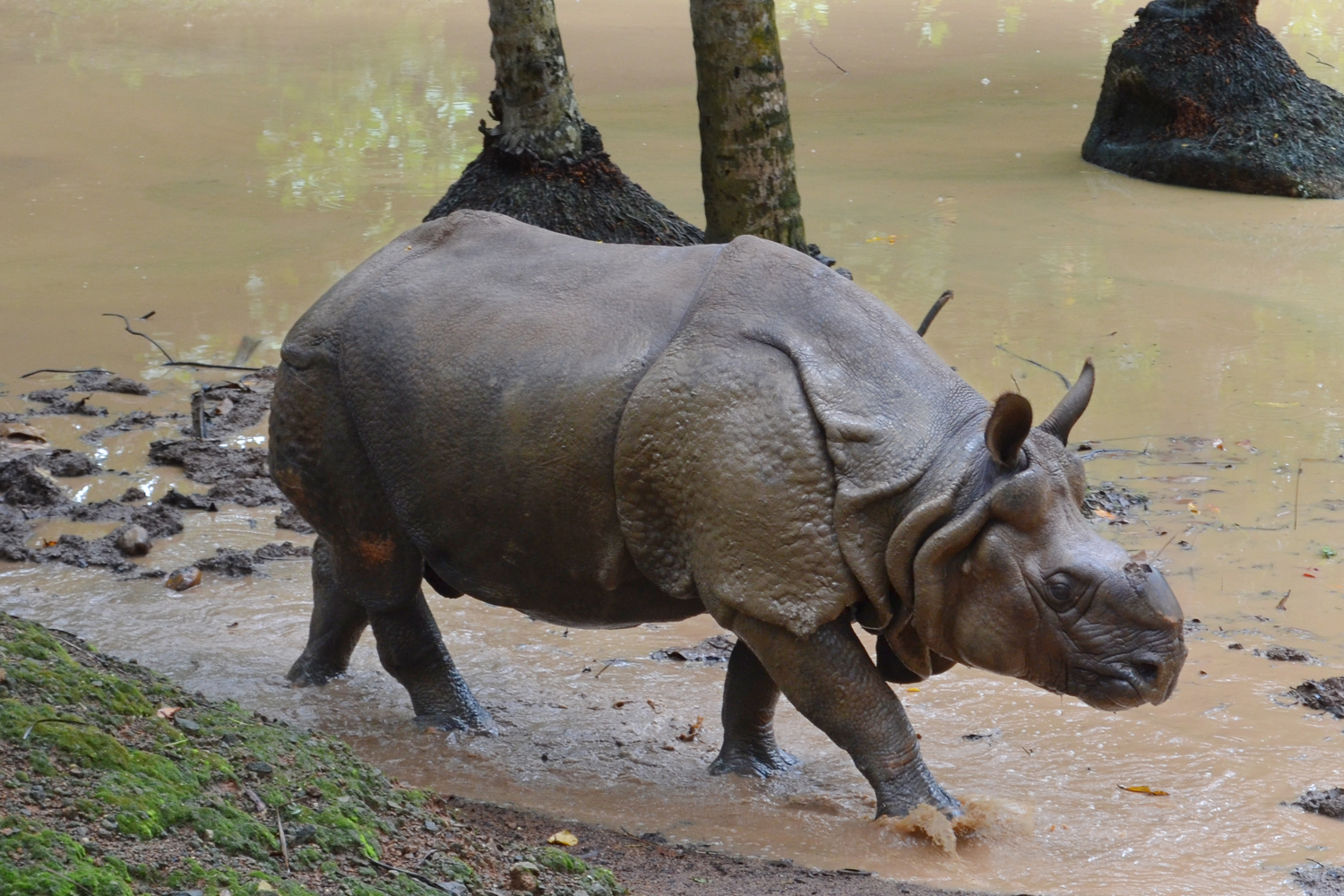
Indian Rhinoceros at Thiruvananthapuram Zoo

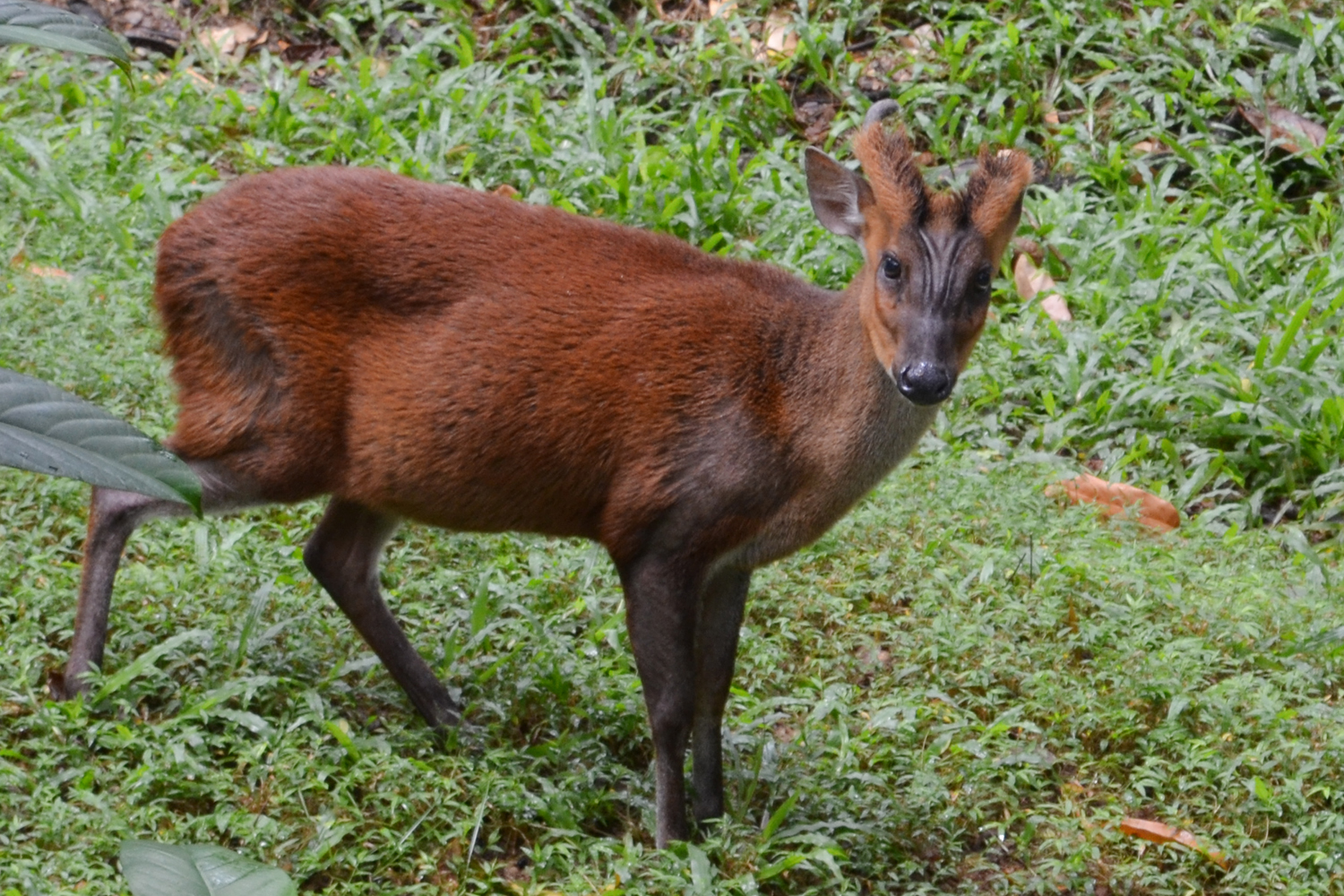
Barking deer at Thiruvananthapuram Zoo

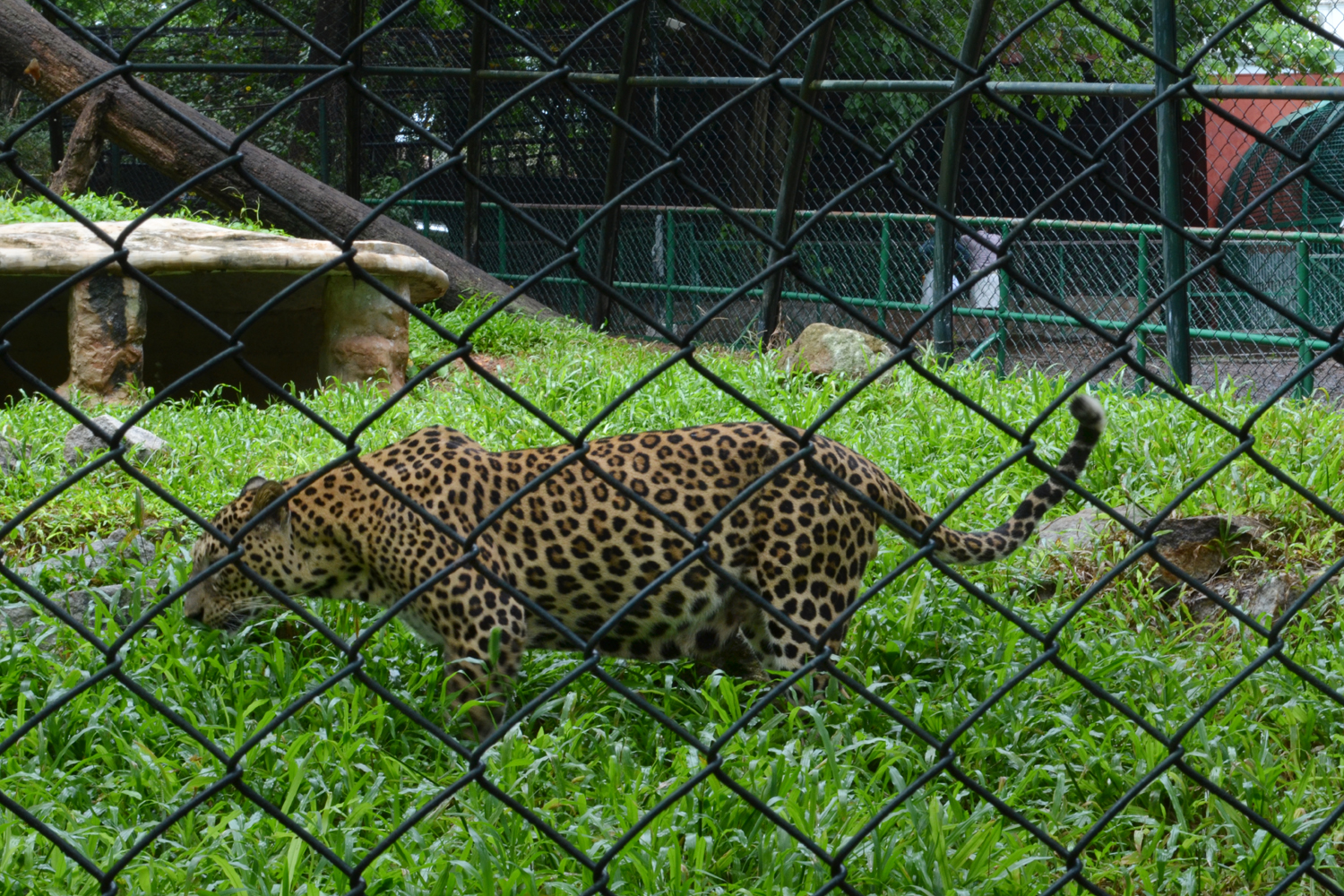
Leopard inside cage at Thiruvananthapuram Zoo

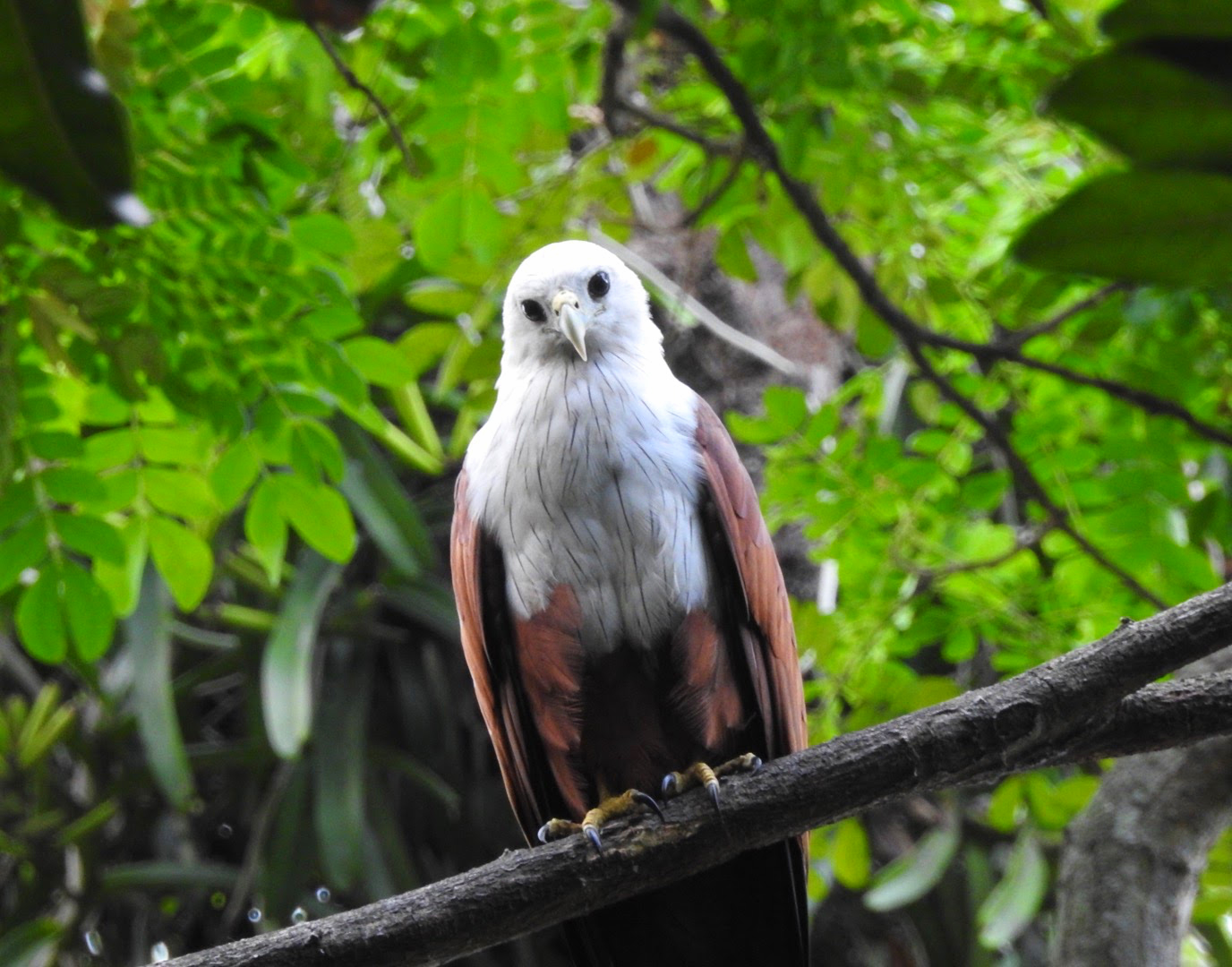
Brahminy Kite found in the zoo

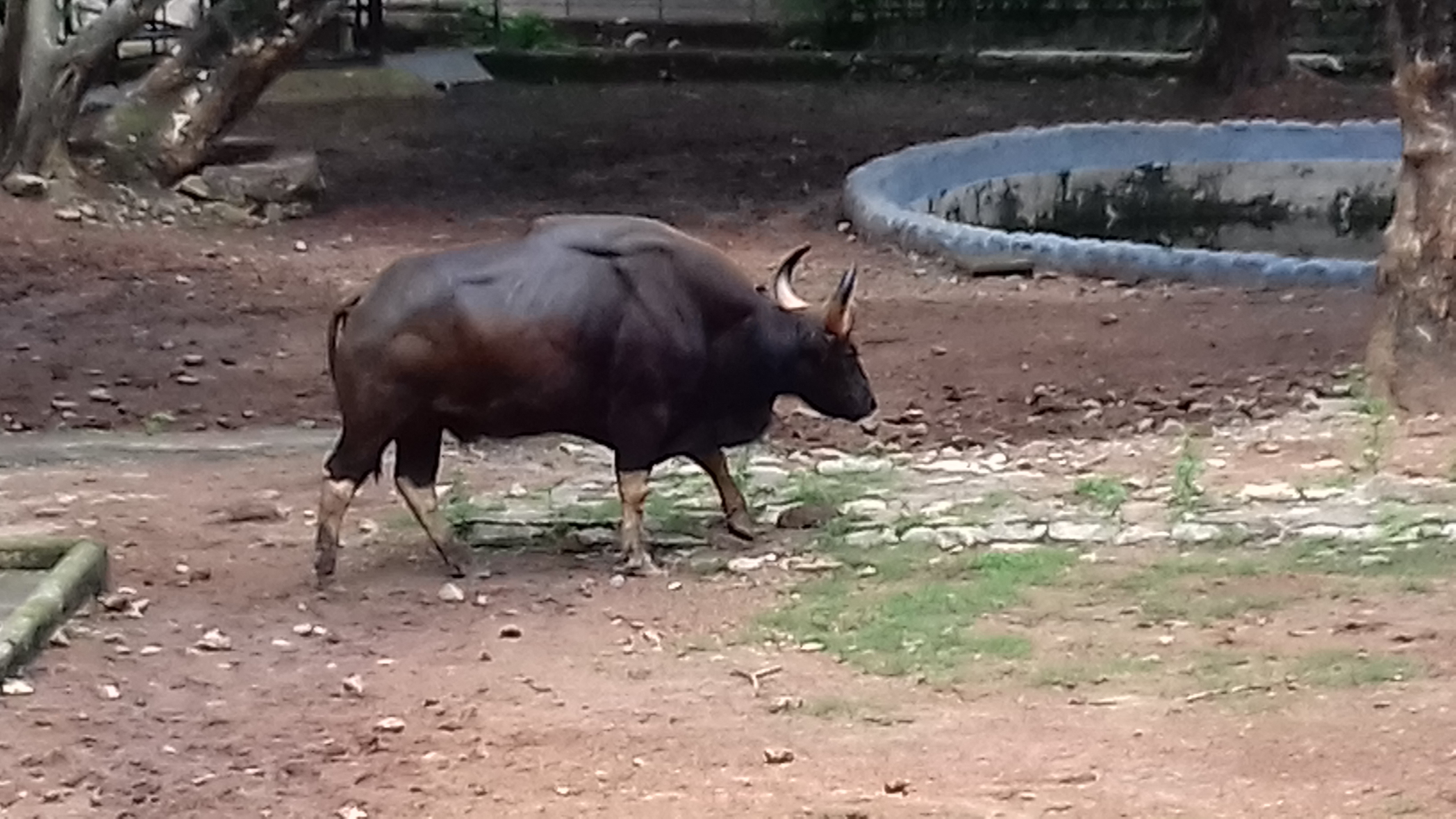
Indian Bison (Gaur) in Thiruvananthapuram zoo

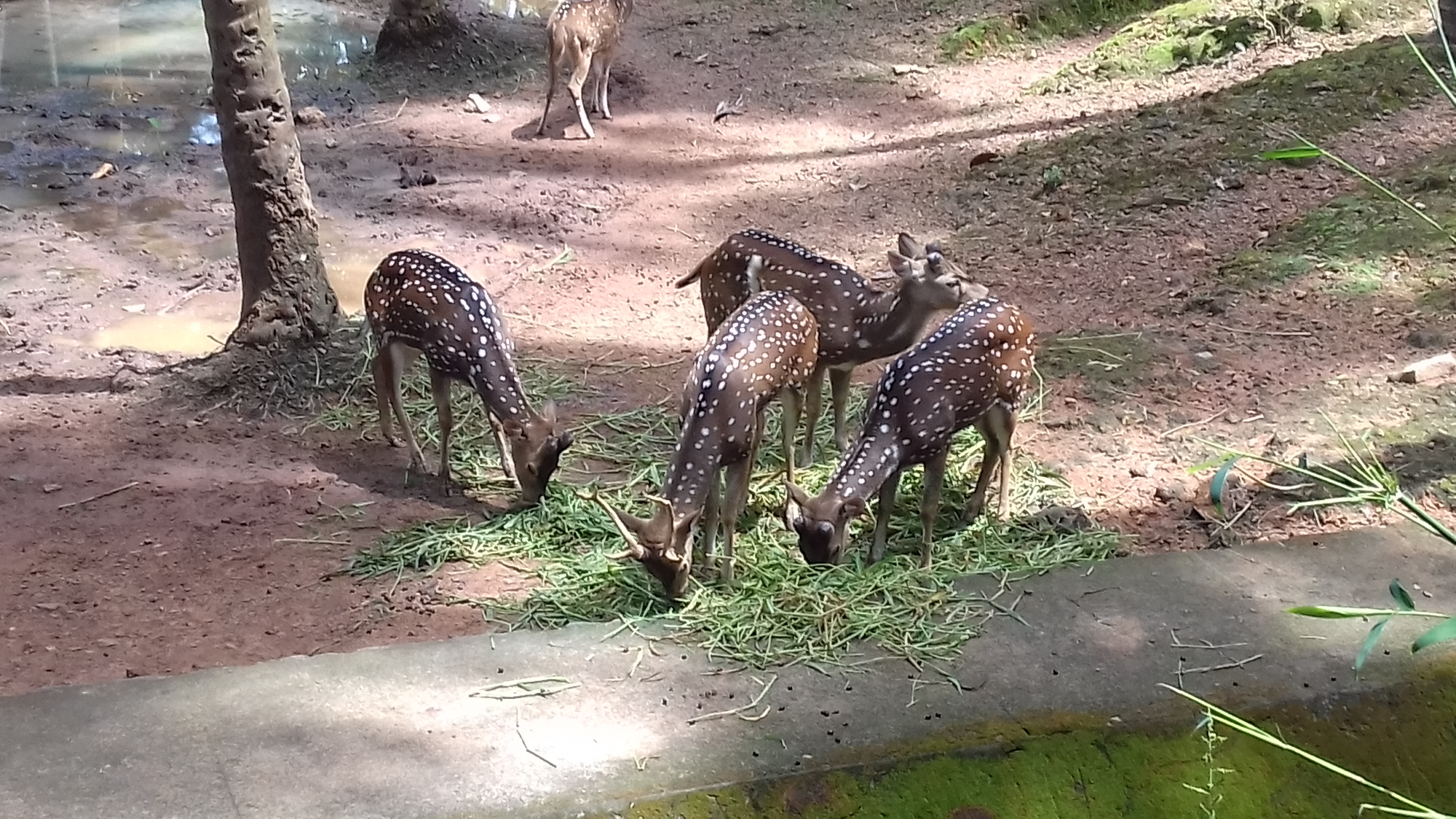
Deer in the zoo

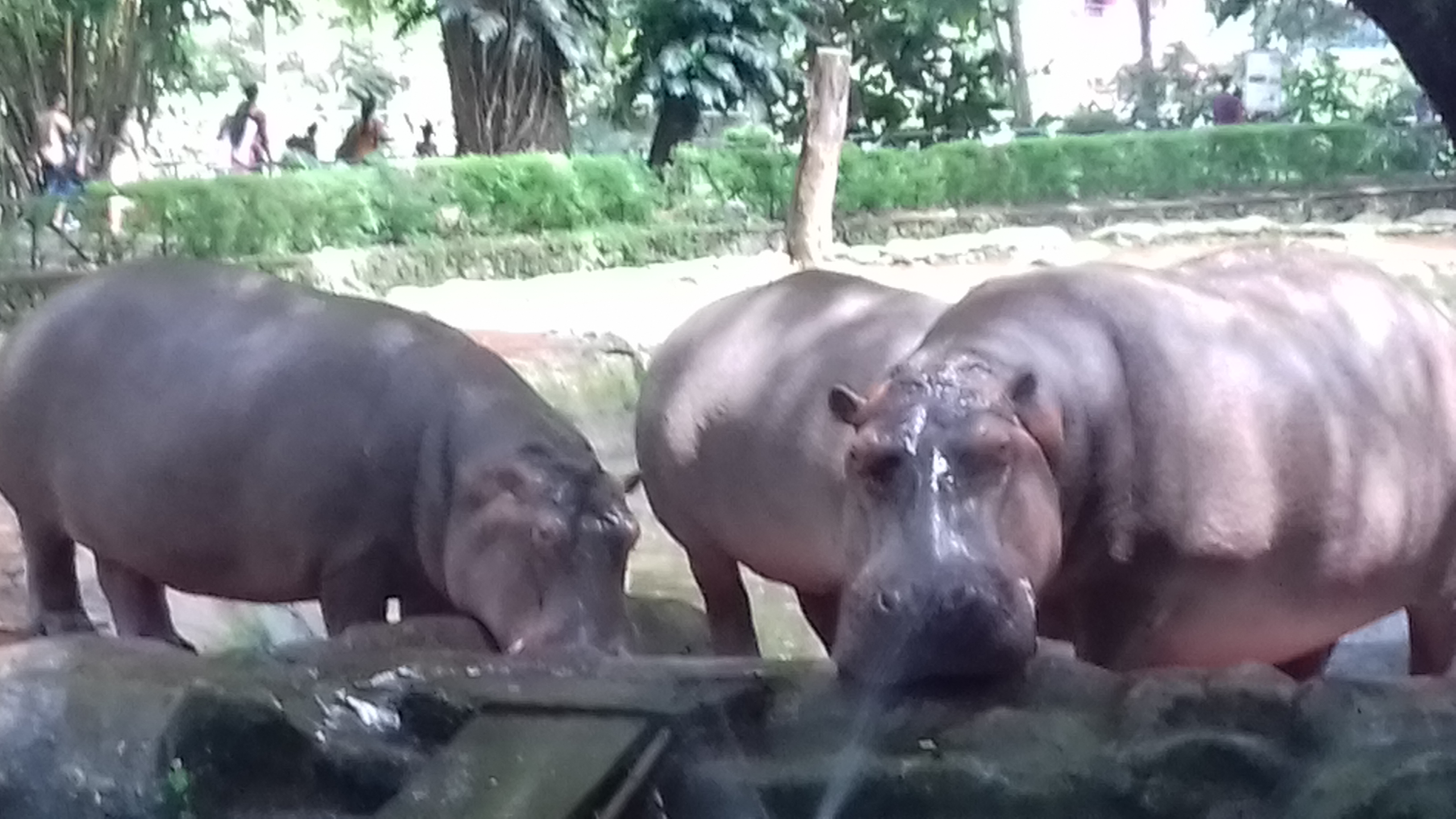
Hippopotamus in the zoo

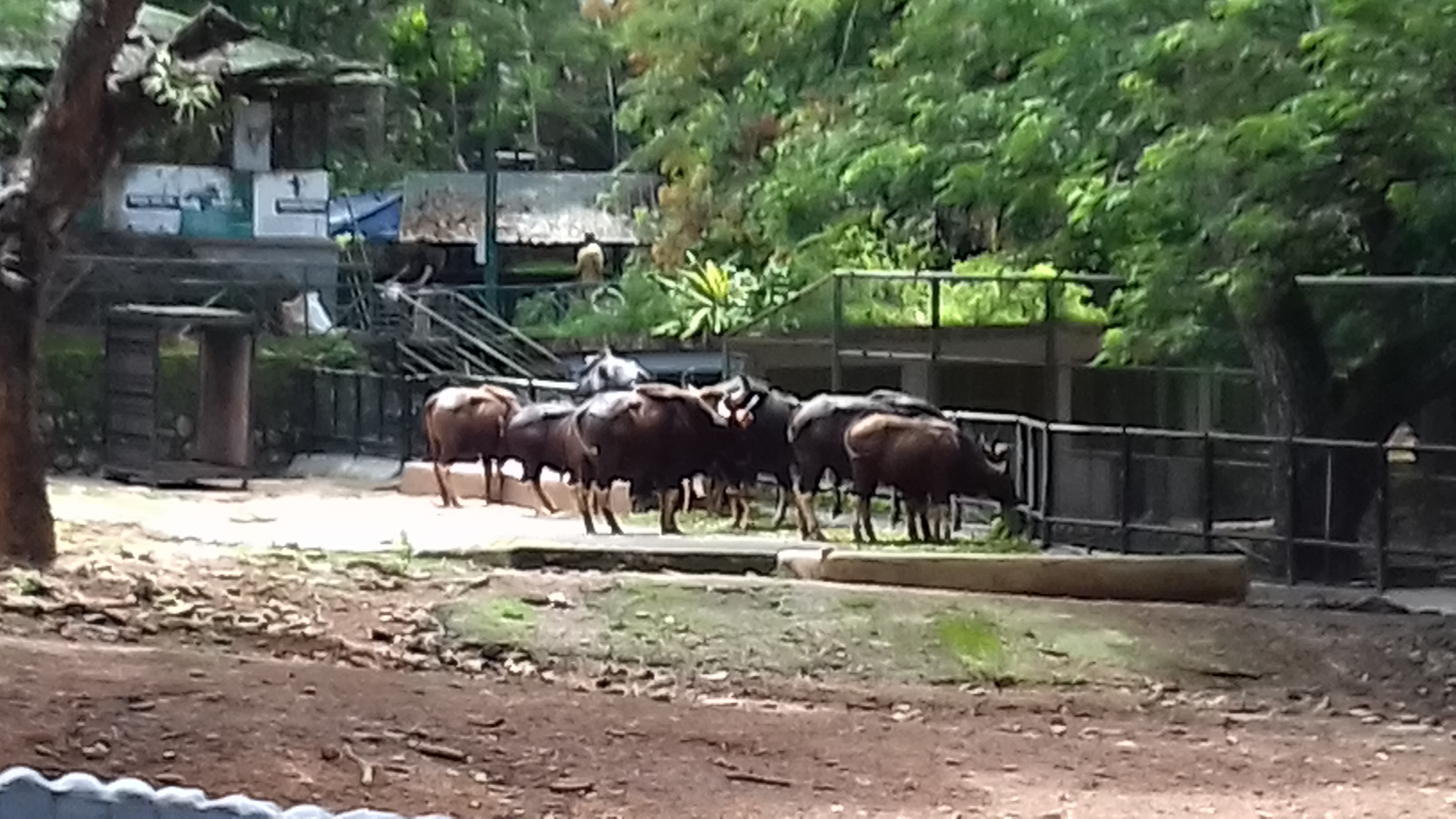
Herd of Indian Bisons in the zoo

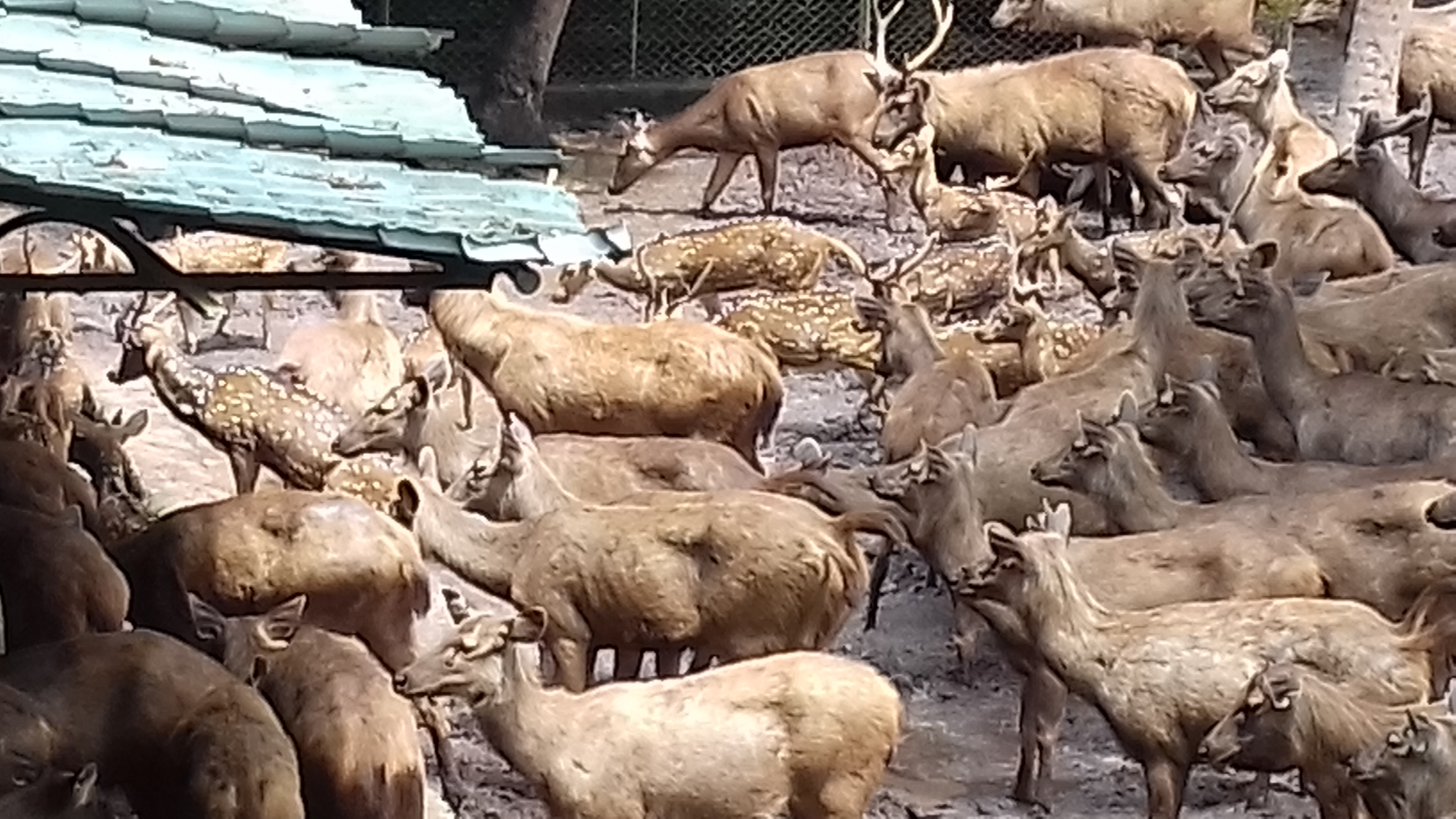
Herd of Deer including sambar in the zoo

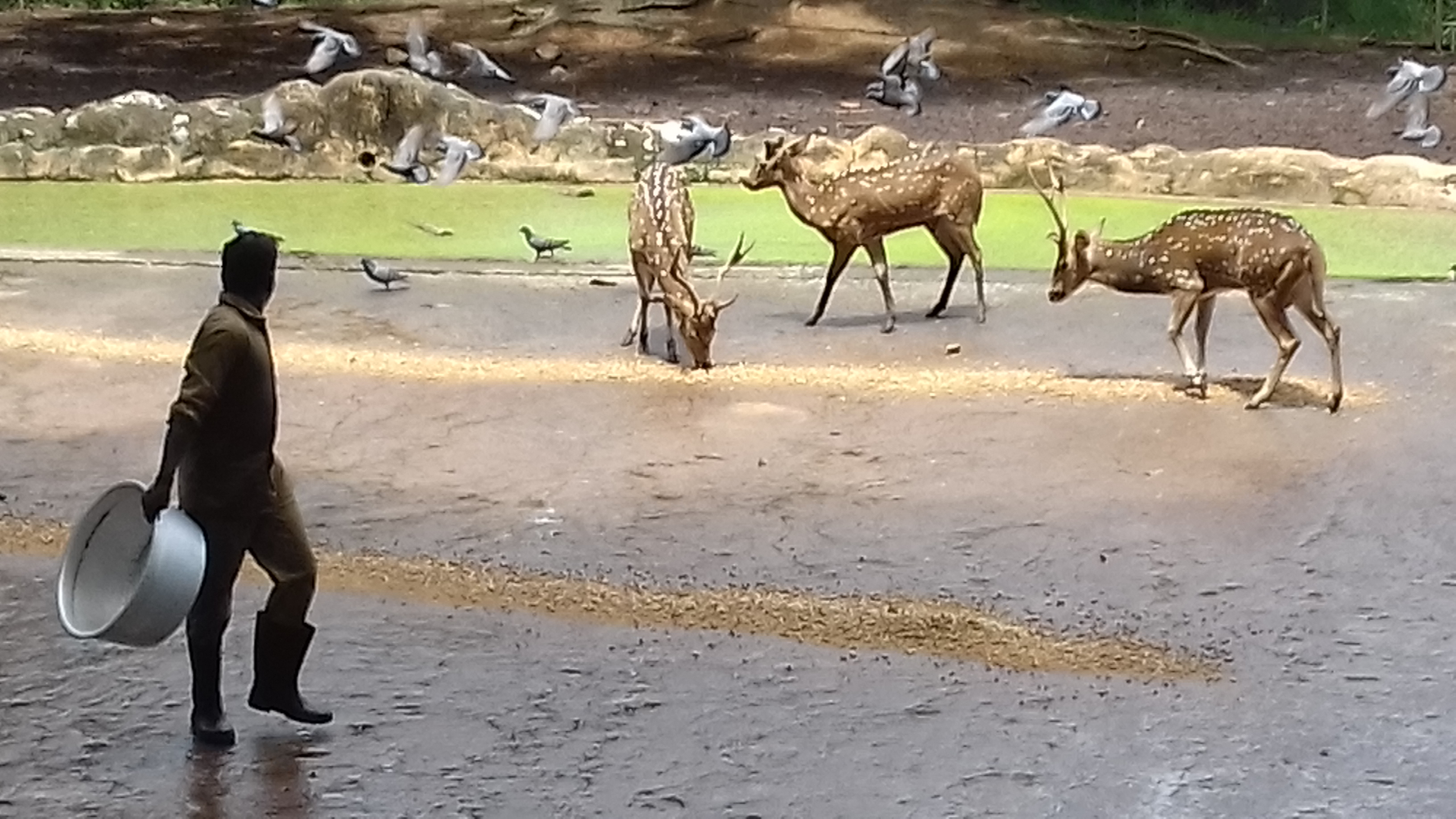
Feeding the deer

Walking Tiger in the zoo

== See also ==
- Delhi Zoo
- Mysore Zoo
- Thrissur Zoo
