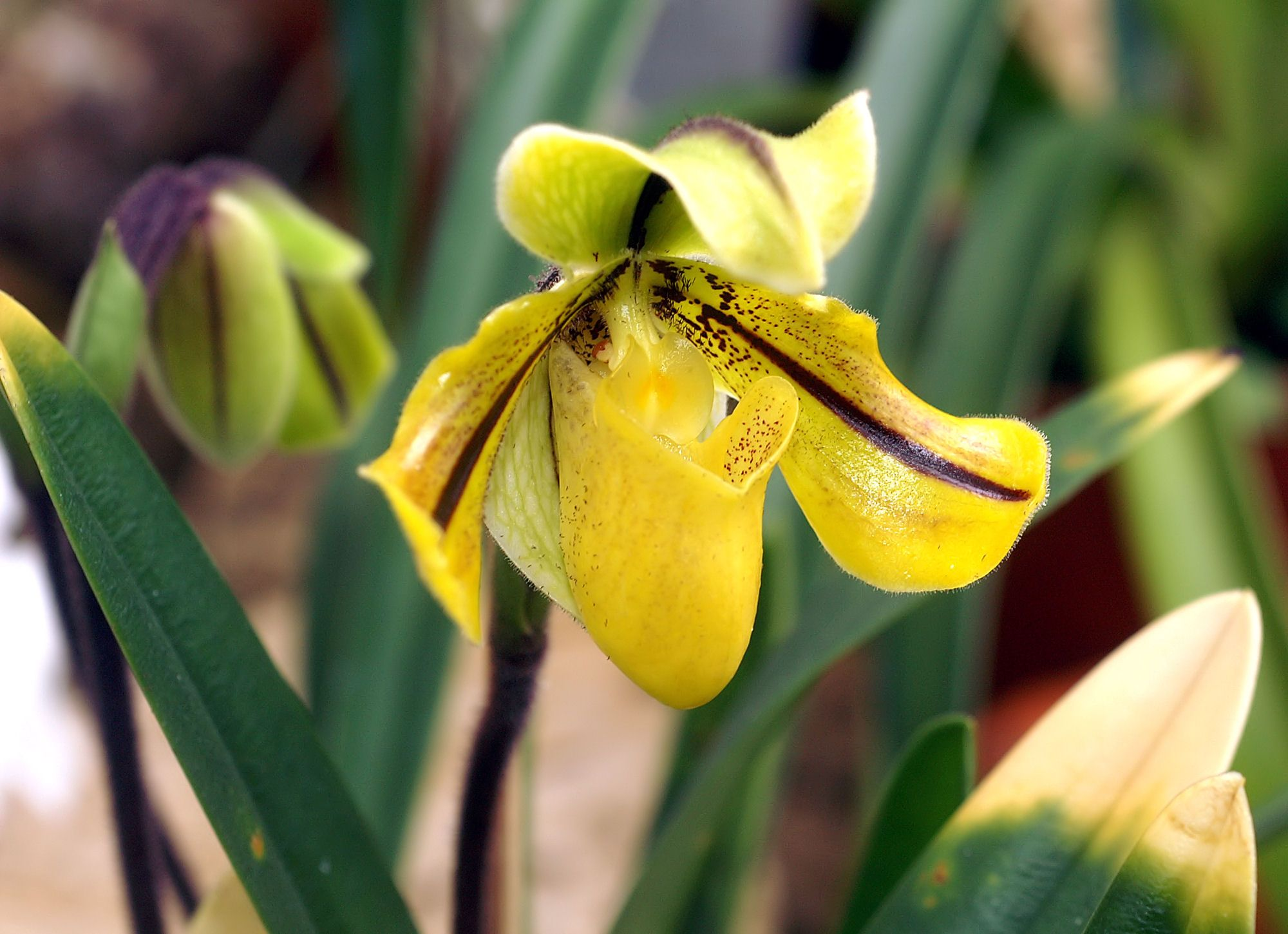
- Flower of Paphiopedilum druryi

Scientific classification
- Kingdom: Plantae
- Clade: Tracheophytes
- Clade: Angiosperms
- Clade: Monocots
- Order: Asparagales
- Family: Orchidaceae
- Subfamily: Cypripedioideae
- Genus: Paphiopedilum
- Species: P. druryi

Binomial name
- Paphiopedilum druryi (Bedd.) Stein

Synonyms
- Cypripedium drurii Bedd. (basionym); Cordula druryi (Bedd.) Rolfe

= Paphiopedilum druryi =

Species of orchid

Paphiopedilum druryi is a species of orchid endemic to the Agastyamalai Hills of southern India. It is the only southern Indian orchid species in the genus. Rediscovered in 1972 after its original description in 1870, wild populations were decimated by commercial collectors and it is one of the few plants that are listed as threatened by the Indian government and included in CITES and the IUCN Redlist.

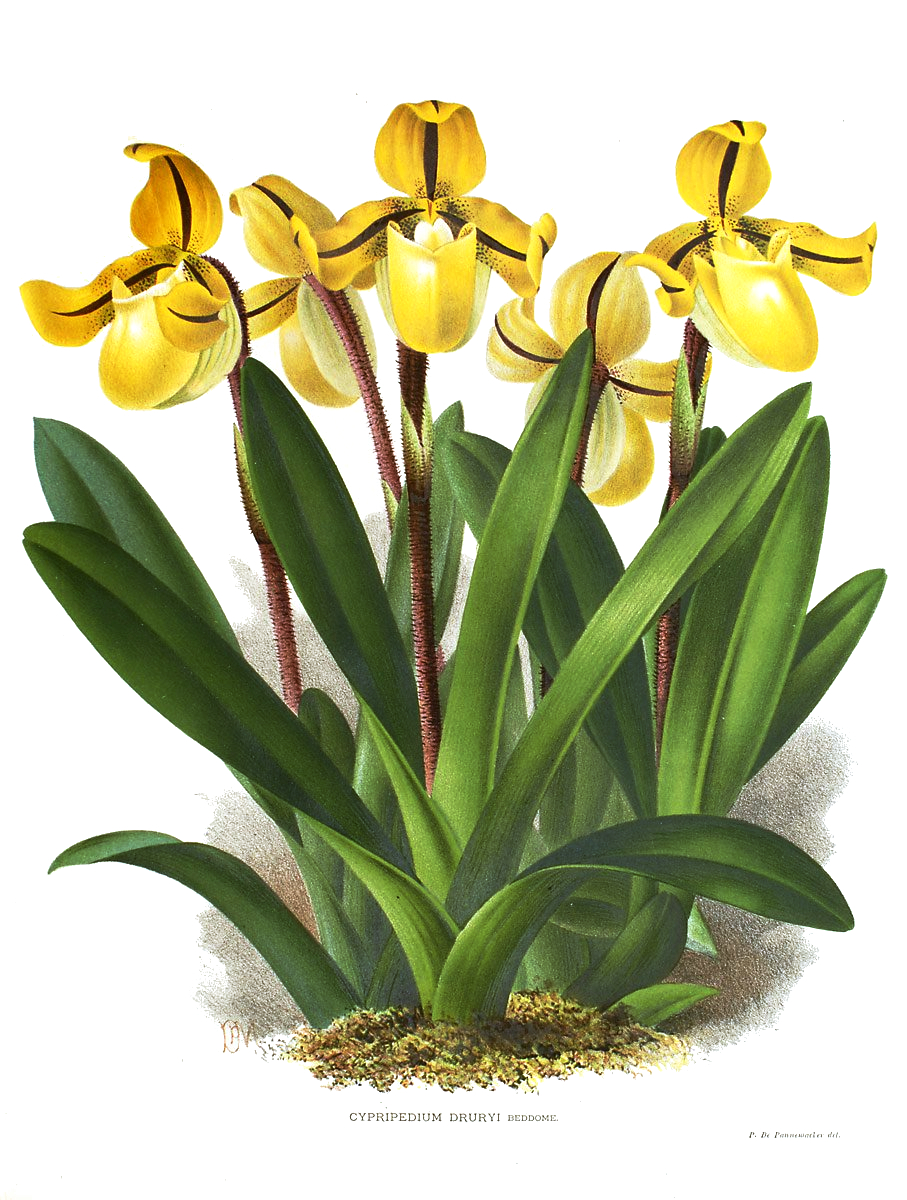
Illustration of a flowering plant

The species was described by Colonel Richard Henry Beddome in 1870 and named after the collector of the first specimens, Colonel Heber Drury (1819-1905), an amateur botanist who worked in Travancore. The species was found in the valleys of the Cardamom Hills and flowers in May and June. The leaves are long and stout. The scape is 7 to 9 inches long and erect and hairy bearing a single flower. The dorsal sepal is broad, pointed and bent forward and greenish to yellow in colour with a purple medial stripe. The outside is hairy. The broad petals also have a dark medial stripe and dark spots towards the base and the flower bends slightly downwards. The lip is pale yellow and channeled at the base. It was introduced into Europe and many hybrids were developed by horticulturists. Harry Veitch produced a hybrid with Cypripedium niveum. Another hybrid buchanianum is a cross between spicerianum and druryi and numerous others hybrids been in trade making the wild type difficult to identify in cultivation.

After the species was described in the 1870s and taken into cultivation in Europe, the species was not seen in the wild until 1972. Almost immediately the new colony of plants that was discovered, with as many of 3000 plants, was wiped out by commercial collectors. Just three plants were found and safeguarded.

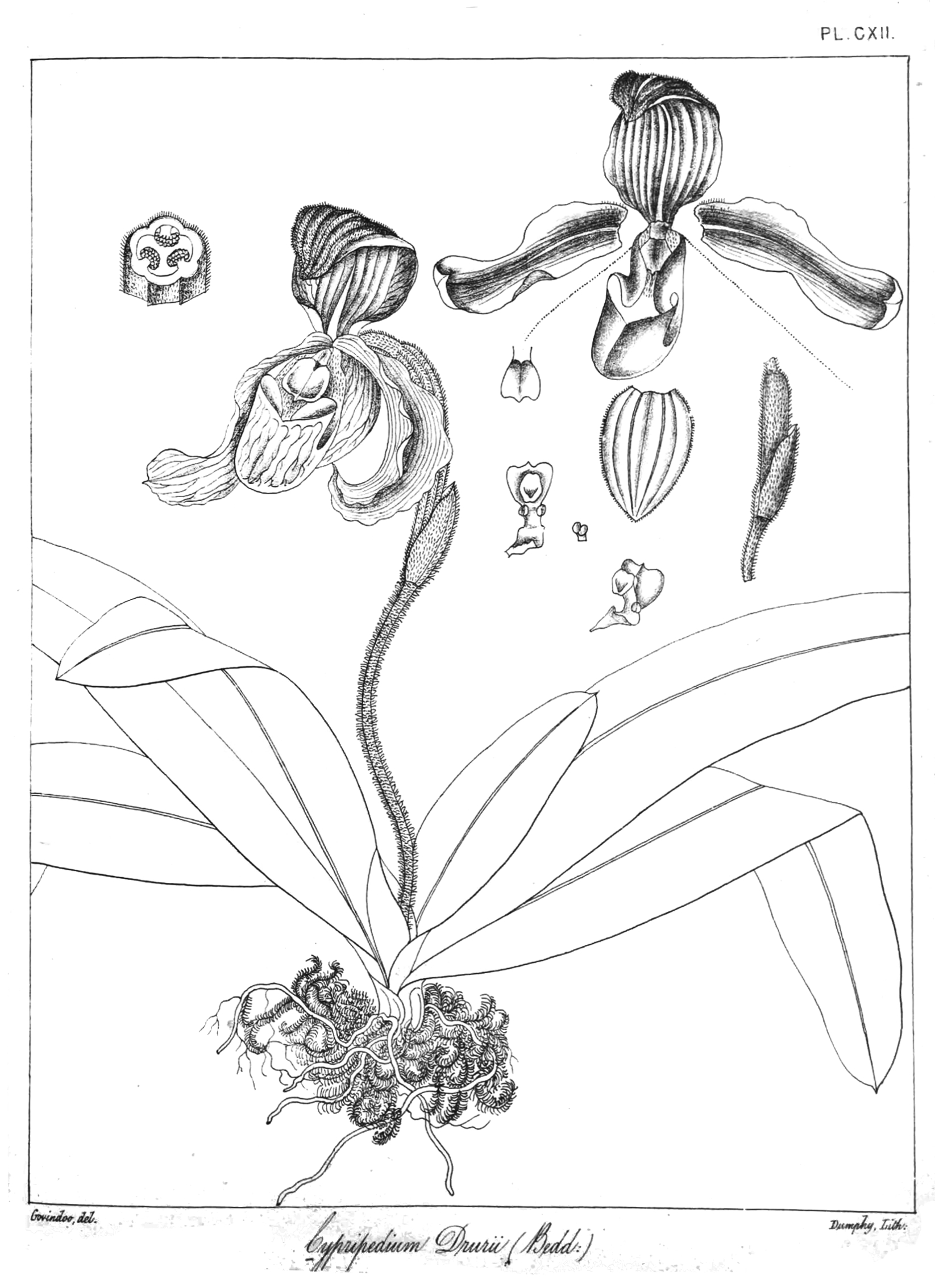
Illustration in Beddome's description made by Govindoo
