= Francis Hodgson =

British educator, writer and cleric (1781–1852)

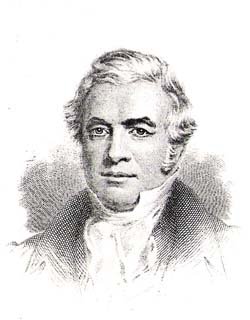
Francis Hodgson, Provost of Eton

Francis Hodgson (16 November 1781 – 29 December 1852; also known as Frank Hodgson in correspondence) was a reforming Provost of Eton, educator, cleric, writer of verse, and friend of Byron.

== Life ==
Hodgson was born on 16 November 1781, son of Rev. James Hodgson, Headmaster of Whitgift School, whose father James Hodgson had moved from Hawkshead, Cumbria, to be rector of Humber, Herefordshire. Francis and one of his half-sisters were the only two of his father's seven children to live beyond the age of 15.

He was educated first at Whitgift School, before proceeding to Eton College as a King's Scholar, and then as a Scholar to King's College, Cambridge.

In 1806 he was appointed assistant master at Eton, a post which he resigned after a year to become a resident tutor and Fellow at King's College, Cambridge. It was there that he met and formed a lifelong friendship with the poet Lord Byron, who was at that time an undergraduate at Trinity College. Their friendship is recorded in the many letters between them that have been published in biographies of Byron.

In 1813 Francis Hodgson wished to marry Susanna Tayler (sister-in-law of Henry Drury, master at Harrow School). However Susanna's mother objected to her daughter marrying Hodgson, due to his association with the infamous Byron. Her objection was overcome by Byron himself, who drove with Hodgson in a post-chaise from London to Oxford to plead the cause of his friend with Susanna's uncle Charles Henry Hall, Dean of Christ Church, Oxford.

In March 1840 Hodgson returned to Eton, having been nominated to be Provost by the Queen on the advice of Prime Minister Lord Melbourne. The Fellows of Eton, however, rejected his nomination on the basis that Hodgson was not a Doctor of Divinity, a qualification that had always previously been required for the post. They instead elected John Lonsdale, but when Lonsdale became aware of the situation, he stood down in favour of Hodgson.

As he drove over Fifteen Arch Bridge (the approach to Eton from the north) to begin his tenure as Provost, Hodgson was reported to have said, "Please God, if I live, I will do something for those poor boys." While he was Provost, which was until the end of his life, Hodgson "quite disappointed the best wishes of his enemies, and proved one of the best friends that Eton ever had."

Hodgson made many reforms to the college, intended to lessen the harshness of conditions for pupils. Together with the headmaster Hawtrey he abolished Long Chamber (the space in which Collegers (King's Scholars) lived, of which it was said in 1834, "wherever the fame of Eton had spread, the name of Long Chamber was both a proverb and a reproach."), ceased the custom of Montem, and closed the old Christopher Inn. "Few of our benefactors have done more 'for those poor boys.'"

In 1838 Hodgson married as his second wife, Eliza, daughter of Thomas Denman, 1st Baron Denman.

He died on 29 December 1852 in the Provost's Lodge at Eton, and was buried in College Chapel. His portrait hangs in College Hall.

Among other works, he made a translation of Juvenal (1808) and wrote Lady Jane Grey, with Miscellaneous Poems in English and Latin (1809) and Sir Edgar, a Tale, in two Cantos (1810).

In October 2009, fifteen letters to Hodgson from Byron sold for £277,350, a world record for a series of letters or a manuscript by a British romantic poet.
