= John Drury (cricketer) =

English cricketer

Personal information
- Full name: John Joseph Drury
- Born: 28 May 1874; Kimberley, Nottinghamshire, England
- Died: 16 October 1919 (aged 45); Dobcross, Yorkshire, England
- Batting: Right-handed
- Bowling: Right-arm fast

Domestic team information
- Years: Team
- 1899–1902: Nottinghamshire

Career statistics
Competition	First-class
Matches	4
Runs scored	21
Batting average	7.00
100s/50s	–/–
Top score	19
Balls bowled	208
Wickets	4
Bowling average	17.75
5 wickets in innings	–
10 wickets in match	–
Best bowling	1/1
Catches/stumpings	–/–
- Source: Cricinfo, 22 May 2012

John Joseph Drury (28 May 1874 – 16 October 1919) was an English cricketer. Drury was a right-handed batsman who bowled right-arm fast. He was born at Kimberley, Nottinghamshire.

Drury made his first-class debut for Nottinghamshire against Lancashire in the 1899 County Championship. He made two further first-class appearances in that season's competition, against Surrey and Sussex. He made a fourth and final first-class appearance for the county in 1902 against the Marylebone Cricket Club. In his four first-class appearances for the county, he scored a total of 21 runs at an average of 7.00, with a high score of 19. With the ball, he took 4 wickets at a bowling average of 17.75, with best figures of 1/1.

He died at Dobcross, Yorkshire, on 16 October 1919.
