= Thomas Drury =

Thomas Drury may refer to:

- Thomas Drury (1551–1603), one of a group of men believed to be involved in reporting the playwright Christopher Marlowe for blasphemy
- Thomas Drury (1668) (1668–1723), colonial legislator from Framingham, Massachusetts
- Sir Thomas Drury, 1st Baronet (1712–1759), MP Maldon 1741
- Thomas Joseph Drury (1908–1992), Roman Catholic bishop of San Angelo and of Corpus Christi
- Thomas Drury (bishop) (1847–1926), Anglican bishop and Master of St Catharine's College, Cambridge
