= Henry Drury (educator) =

English educator, classical scholar and friend of Lord Byron

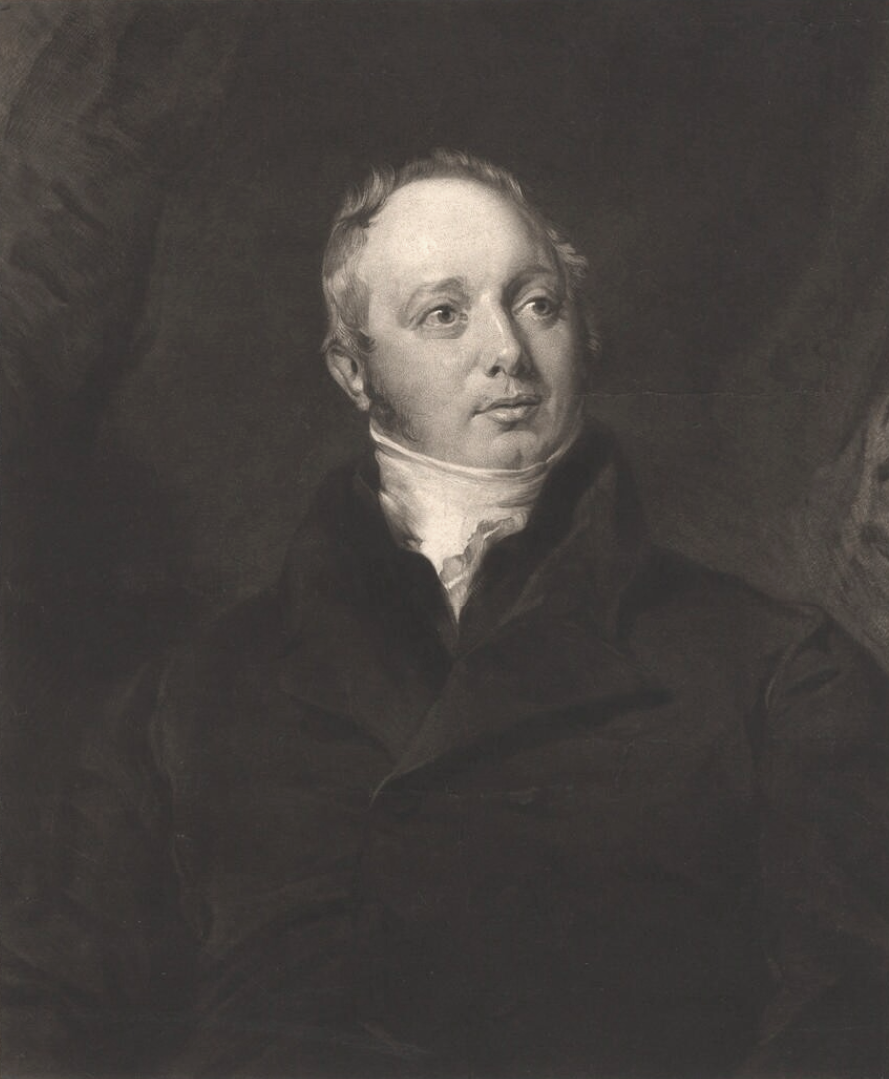
Henry Drury, 1828 engraving

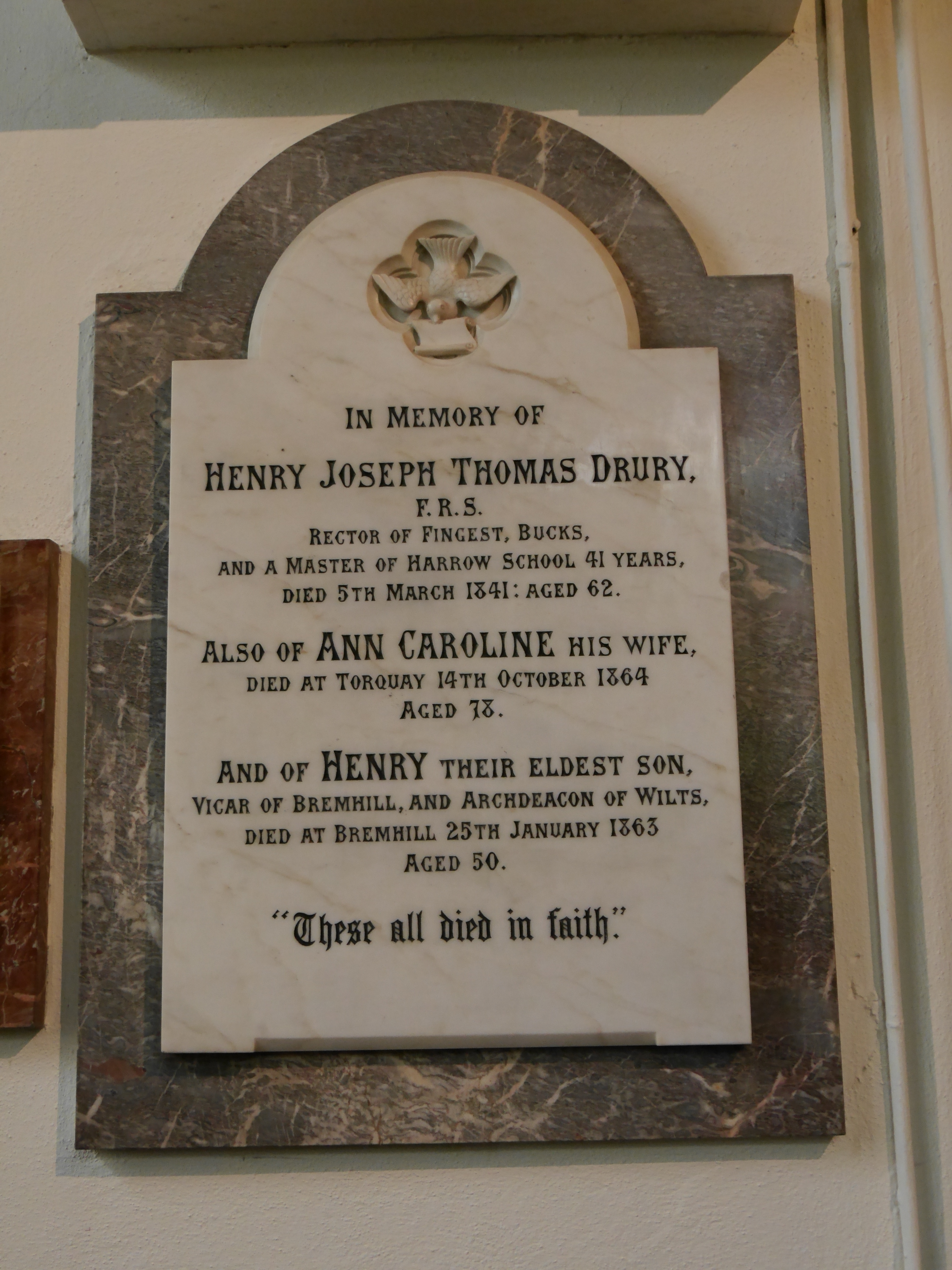
Henry Drury memorial, St Mary's, Harrow on the Hill

Henry Joseph Thomas Drury (27 April 1778 – 5 March 1841), known as Harry Drury, was an English educator, classical scholar, and friend of Lord Byron.

== Life ==
Henry Drury was born 27 April 1778, at Harrow, London, the son of Joseph Drury, headmaster of Harrow School. He was educated at both Harrow and Eton, and at King's College, Cambridge (matriculated 1797, B.A. 1801, M.A. 1804, Fellow 1799–1808).

He was a master at Harrow for 41 years from 1801 to 1841 and was tutor there to Lord Byron to whom he later became a close friend and correspondent.

Drury was elected to the Roxburghe Club on its first anniversary in 1813. He was elected a Fellow of the Royal Society in February 1818.

Drury was considered the favourite candidate to succeed George Butler as headmaster of Harrow in 1829; Charles Longley, an Oxford academic and a last-minute external candidate, was instead appointed. Thereafter Drury's effectiveness as a schoolmaster declined: he became "increasingly eccentric, bad-tempered, and indolent", losing classroom control, missing morning lessons, wearing flowery dressing-gowns, eating fruit during lessons, and borrowing cigars from schoolboys. Nonetheless, he remained well-liked by the boys.

He died at Harrow on 5 March 1841.

== Personal life ==
In 1808 he married Caroline Tayler, daughter of Archdale Wilson Tayler, and sister of the artist John Frederick Tayler. Just two years after the marriage, Byron wrote to Francis Hodgson "Talking of marriage puts me in mind of Drury (who, I suppose, has a dozen children by this time, all fine, fretful brats); I will never forgive matrimony for having spoiled such an excellent bachelor". Caroline's sister Susannah Tayler later married Hodgson.

He had five sons, including Henry Drury, Archdeacon of Wiltshire, Admiral Byron Drury, and Colonel Heber Drury.
