= David Drury (fencer) =

British fencer

Personal information
- Born: 14 March 1888 Sydenham Hill, Greater London, England
- Died: 18 April 1946 (aged 58)

Sport
- Sport: Fencing

Daubeney Drue Drury (14 March 1888 – 18 April 1946) was a British fencer. He competed in the team épée event at the 1928 Summer Olympics.
