= Stephen Drury =

Stephen Drury may refer to:

- Stephen Drury (mathematician), Canadian mathematician
- Stephen Drury (musician) (born 1955), American musician
