= Adam Drury =

Adam Drury may refer to:

- Adam Drury (footballer, born 1978), English professional footballer active 1995–2014
- Adam Drury (footballer, born 1993), English professional footballer active 2007–present
