= John W. Drury =

Australian investment banker (born 1952)

John W. DFury
- Occupation: Investment banker

John William Drury (born 2 January 1952) is an Investment Banker from Australia.

Drury was born in Melbourne, Victoria, Australia. He held the position of Group Chief Executive of County NatWest Investment Bank in London from 1989 to 1992. During this period he was a member of the executive committee of its parent National Westminster Bank and was also the designer and founding board member of NatWest Markets where he served as an executive director on the board.

Prior to this he was the founder and head of J Aron Petroleum, Goldman Sachs's proprietary oil trading business in New York and London. He was later appointed to J Aron's management committee. J Aron Petroleum is widely credited with introducing modern risk management techniques to the physical oil business. After Goldman Sachs he spent a short while at Hellman and Friedman in San Francisco and went on to be a Senior Executive Director of Capel Court Investment Bank in Sydney where he was responsible for the proprietary trading activities of the investment bank and the Treasury of its parent, National Mutual Royal Bank.
