= William Cullen (Resident) =

British Army officer and Resident

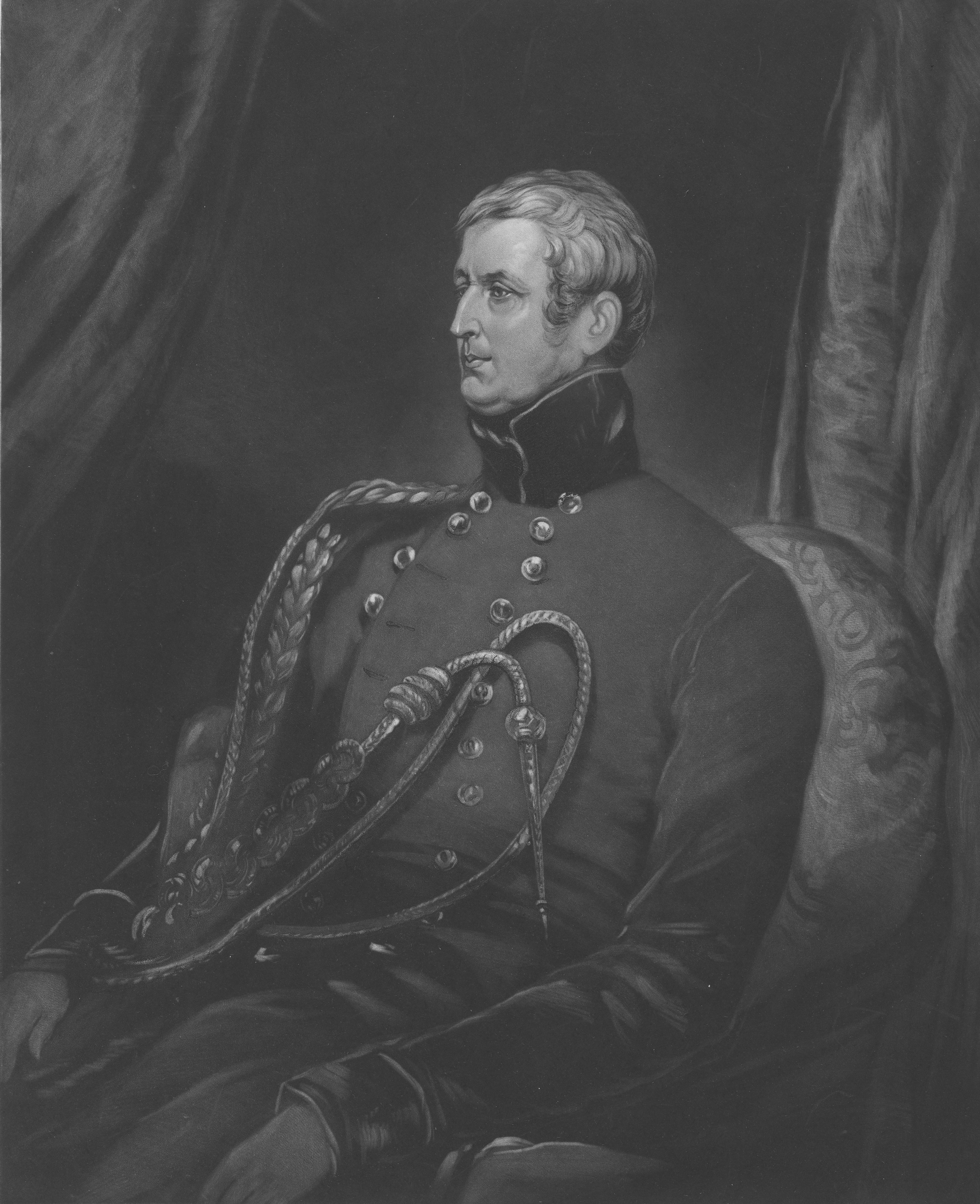
Portrait by F.C. Lewis (1854)

Major General William Cullen (17 May 1785 – 1 October 1862) was a British Army Officer with the Madras Artillery Regiment, and from 1840 to 1860, Resident in the Kingdom of Travancore and Cochin. During his stay in India, he took a scholarly interest in the region and contributed to journals on geology, plants and the culture of the region. He was instrumental in establishing the Napier Museum in Trivandrum. He died at Allepey in Kerala, where a road is named after him.

== Military career ==
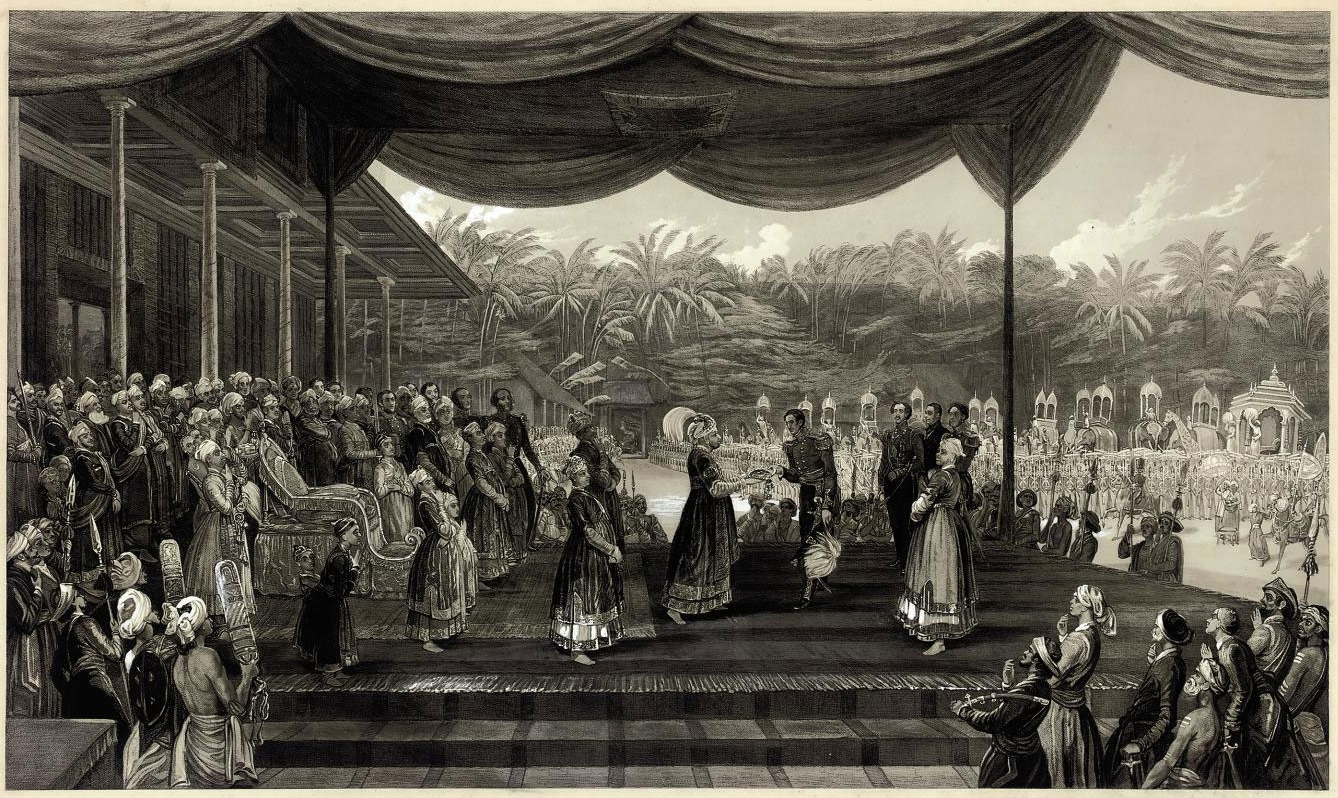
A sketch by F.C. Lewis showing The Durbar of His Highness the Maharaja of Travancore on 27 November 1851 with Cullen carrying a letter from Queen Victoria to the Maharaja of Travancore thanking the latter for his contributions to the Great Exhibition of 1851 which included the gift of a carved ivory chair

Cullen was the son of a barrister, Archibald Cullen (whose father was William Cullen(1710–1790), a founding figure in Scottish medicine) and his wife Finella Sinclair. Cullen joined the Madras Artillery and was in the position of lieutenant in 1803. Cullen was posted in India in 1804 and his early service was at Khandeish and Berar as part of the Hyderabad subsidiary force. He commanded an artillery brigade during 1805 that helped overthrow a Mahratta force. He was part of the reinforcement sent from Madras to fight the French and was present during the capture of St. Denis in Bourbon in July 1810 during the Napoleonic Wars. He was promoted colonel in 1842 and posted as resident in 1840 following the death of Colonel Maclean. Promoted to major general and then lieutenant general in November 1851, he remained as resident from September 1840 to January 1860 and continued to live in Travancore after his retirement. He tried to move to the Nilgiris for health, but on the way he caught a fever at Quilon and died at Allepey on 1 October 1862.

== Contributions ==
Cullen interacted mainly with the Maharajas of Travancore Swathi Thirunal Rama Varma and Uthram Thirunal Marthanda Varma and took considerable interest in scholarly and cultural pursuits. He appears to have prepared a dictionary of English and Malayalam which is briefly mentioned by Reverend B. Bailey in his 1849 dictionary, and promoted the idea of a museum that was to become the Trivandrum Museum (now Napier Museum). The idea for the museum originated in 1843 when he wrote a memorandum to the Madras Government that local museums would aid natives in gaining practical knowledge while also helping to preserve antiquities from the region. The idea was approved in 1854 and a museum was set up in 1857. He also donated his own collection of geological specimens to this museum. About 3000 visitors were recorded in the first year of which 10% were women. The museum project was aided by John Allan Broun, an astronomer and geologist who also maintained careful meteorological records around Trivandrum. Cullen was however critical of the magnetic observations at the observatory as conducted by John Caldecott. Christian missionaries in the region found Cullen to support local culture and disapproving of missionary activities to the point that some claimed that he had become a Hindu ("thoroughly Hindooized by an uninterrupted residence of nearly fifty years in India"). Cullen wrote regularly in the Madras journal of literature and science and took part in discussions on a range of topics. He made a critical commentary on an enquiry into the idea that the destruction of forests was leading to a reduction in rainfall. His notes on the topic which were compiled by Edward Balfour questioned the premise and pointed out the lack of precise data ("facts") in the claims ("opinions") made by Alexander von Humboldt on deforestation leading to desiccation. Cullen was greatly interested in applying science to economic pursuits and his interest in geology led to the discovery of graphite deposits in Kerala. Cullen also helped obtain specimens for museums in Britain. William Henry Sykes requested him to send samples of Roman gold coins discovered in 1851 at a village on a hill about ten miles east of Cannanore. These gold coins were deposited in the Museum of the East India Company. Cullen was responsible for the introduction of tea cultivation in the Ashambu and Velimala hills. This plantation was later continued by Grant and Fraser who set up commercial operations in 1864–65.

He was succeeded as Resident by F. N. Maltby. The genus of the tree Cullenia excelsa was named after him by Robert Wight. Cullen Road in Alappuzha was named after him.
