= Drury Rock =

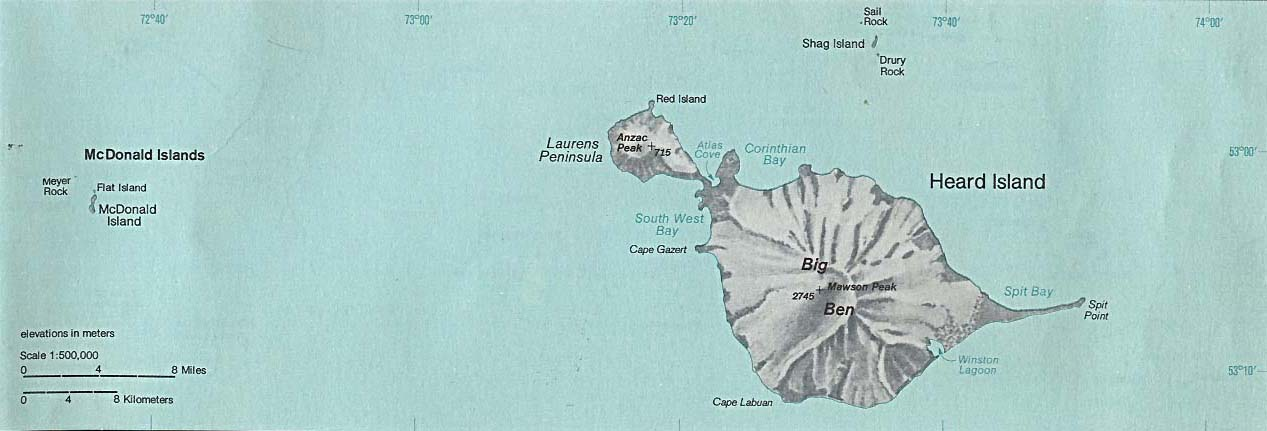
Drury Rock is to the south-southeast of Shag Island

Drury Rock (52°56′S 73°35′E) is a rock, about 37 metres (120 ft) high, lying 0.3 nautical miles (0.6 km) south-southeast of Shag Island and 6 nautical miles (11 km) north of Heard Island. This rock, though positioned several miles too far westward, appears to have been first shown on an 1860 sketch map compiled by Captain H.C. Chester, an American sealer operating in the area during this period. It was more accurately charted on an 1874 chart by a British expedition under George Nares in the Challenger. It was surveyed in 1948 by the Australian National Antarctic Research Expeditions, who named it for Alan Campbell-Drury, a radio operator and photographer with the party.
