= Napier Museum =

Art museum, archaeology museum in Kerala, India

- Established: 1855
- Location: Thiruvananthapuram, Kerala, India
- Type: Art museum, Archaeology museum
- Founder: Marthanda Varma II
- Website: www.napiermuseum.org

The Napier Museum is an art and natural history museum situated in Thiruvananthapuram, India.

The museum grounds are home to the Thiruvananthapuram Zoo, one of the oldest zoological gardens in India. The zoo was established in 1857 over 55 acres (220,000 m^{2}) of land. It also contains the Sree Chitra Art Gallery, a separate art gallery established in 1935.

The set of museums, along with the zoo, are managed by the Department of Museums and Zoos, a branch of the Department of Cultural Affairs of Kerala.

== History ==
A building was constructed in 1857 during the reign of Uthram Thirunal Marthanda Varma, and later demolished in 1874 to lay the foundation for a new building, during the reign of Ayilyam Thirunal.

The Governor of Madras in 1872 appointed Robert Chisholm, a consulting architect of the Madras Government**, to design** a new museum. In 1880, construction finished and the museum opened to the public, bearing the namesake of its governor, Francis Napier, 10th Lord Napier.

The Indo-Saracenic structure lacks an air conditioning system. Although it has never been an issue due to suitable natural ventilation, an annex built in 2016 was noted for various problems such as mold, insects and corrosion owing to the lack of windows and openings. Since 2017, the annexed museum depot has been under review and is being rebuilt. Furthermore, the Napier Museum itself is being renovated.

== Design ==
Some of the building features include a gothic roof and minarets. The Napier Museum, a landmark of the city, is noted for its unique ornamentation and architectural style, which is influenced by Indian, Chinese, Kerala and Mughal schools of architecture.

The museum has a bandstand with concealed speakers and special acoustics. In the old days, the band of the Travancore Nair Brigade would play there every Friday. Later, the police band would play on Saturdays.

The museum owns a garden which has many varieties of flowers and trees. It also shelters the oldest living rubber tree in Kerala. It was brought there in 1876 from Ceylon and planted in the museum grounds by Visakham Thirunal.

== Collection ==
The museum houses a rare collection of archaeological and historic artifacts, bronze idols, ancient ornaments, a temple chariot and ivory carvings. The Indian epics, the Mahabharata and the Ramayana are the inspiration for the museum's collection of Javanese shadow play leather puppets.

== Timings ==
Visiting Hours: Open 10.00 – 16.45 hrs. Closed on Mondays, Wednesday forenoons, 26 January, 15 August, Thiruvonam and Mahanavami.
