= Robert Drury =

Robert Drury may refer to:

== Politicians ==
- Robert Drury (speaker) (died 1536), Speaker of the House of Commons
- Robert Drury (died 1557), MP for Thetford
- Robert Drury (1525-93), in 1558 Member of Parliament (MP) for Buckingham and Chipping Wycombe
- Sir Robert Drury (17th century MP) (1575–1616), English MP for Suffolk and Eye
- Robert Drury (died 1577) (c. 1503–1577), English MP for Buckinghamshire

== Others ==
- Robert Drury (priest) (1567–1607), English Roman Catholic priest, executed for treason
- Robert Drury (Jesuit) (1587–1623), English Jesuit
- Robert Drury (sailor) (1687–?), English sailor on the Degrave who was shipwrecked at the age of 17 on the island of Madagascar
- Robert Drury (baseball) (1878–1933), minor league baseball player and manager
- Sir Robert Drury, 3rd Baronet of the Drury baronets
