= David Drury (cricketer) =

English cricketer (born 1961)

Personal information
- Full name: David Brian Drury
- Born: 1 May 1961 (age 65); Blackpool, Lancashire, England
- Batting: Left-handed
- Role: Wicket-keeper

Domestic team information
- Years: Team
- 1985: Cumberland
- Only LA: 3 July 1985 Cumberland v Middlesex

Career statistics
Competition	List A
Matches	1
Runs scored	4
Batting average	4.00
100s/50s	0/0
Top score	4
Catches/stumpings	1/–
- Source: CricketArchive, 21 February 2010

David Brian Drury (born 1 May 1961) is an English former cricketer. He was a left-handed batsman and wicket-keeper who played for Cumberland.

Drury made his debut for Cumberland in the Minor Counties Championship on 28 May 1985, playing as a specialist batsman at number seven. Cumberland, who had former Test cricketer David Lloyd opening the batting, won the match by 116 runs, with Drury scoring 27 in the first-innings and 24* in the second. He played in five further matches in the Minor Counties Championship, but failed to better his score of 27. His only List A appearance came in the first round of the 1985 NatWest Trophy, when he scored four runs during a loss to Middlesex.
