= Drury convention =

Convention in contract bridge

The Drury convention is a bridge convention, used to show a game-invitational major suit raise by a passed hand while guarding against a light opening by partner in third or fourth seat. It is initiated by an artificial and forcing 2♣ response by the passed hand to a 1♥ or 1♠ opening by partner. The 2♣ bid shows at least three-card support for opener's suit with 10-12 support points and asks opener to clarify the strength of their opening hand. The convention is also known in Europe as "Toronto".

== Origins and purpose ==
The convention was developed by Canadian Douglas Drury (1914–1967) and his then playing partner Eric Murray (1928–2018) to manage Murray's propensity to open light in third seat. Opening light (i.e. with marginally less than normal values) in the third seat is a common and effective bidding tactic because the player in the fourth seat may well have the best hand at the table and be poised to open the bidding given the opportunity. A third seat light opening, especially in a major suit, will act preemptively to make it harder for that player to enter the bidding. However, it creates two problems:

1. a simple change of suit is no longer a forcing bid, and
2. responding partner, already a passed hand, is unsure if his opening partner has a normal or light opening, and any jump response could get the partnership too high.

The traditional way to show good support for opener's suit is to jump to the three-level (e.g. 1♥ – 3♥). But if partner has opened light, this may result in an overly ambitious contract, despite the good support. Drury allows responding partner to learn if his opening partner has opened with a normal opening hand or has a light opening hand. If it is a light hand, or even a minimum normal opening hand, the contract can be set at the two-level, whereas non-Drury partnerships, with the same hands, would have to sign off at greater risk at the three-level. Owing to its role in the competitive bidding of part-score contracts, Drury is advantageous primarily in match point scoring events.

== Opener's rebid ==
=== Original Drury convention ===
The convention was first published in The Bridge World in January 1957. Murray's presentation of the original convention included the following features:

1. The Drury 2♣ is an artificial one-round force by a passed hand responding to partner's third or fourth-hand major suit opening bid
2. With a normal opening bid, opener rebids normally but with a light opening hand, he negatives with 2♦
3. With a distributional hand containing length in opener's major but with fewer than 9 HCP, responder preempts by jumping to the 3-level in opener's suit

=== Reverse Drury ===
A rebid of 2♦ shows a full opening. While not universally accepted, a bid of 2♥ by opener after opening 1♠ is also a weakish bid showing five spades and four hearts (or better). With a good hand (say 15 or more points) opener may simply jump to game (four of the major suit). Other bids tend to be natural and descriptive, in effect a game try. With an excellent hand, opener may be interested in a slam and will bid accordingly.

== Responses by the Drury bidder ==
In the sequence 1M-2♣; 2♦, opener has confirmed a full opening hand and the following rebids by the Drury bidder enables opener to judge the best final contract:

- 2♥ - I have a minimum Drury hand
- 2♠ - I have a maximum Drury hand but only three trumps
- 2NT - I have a maximum Drury hand with four trumps

== Two-way Drury ==
In this variant, the passed hand with 10+ points responds 2♣ to show exactly three-card support and 2♦ to show four-card support or better. This may help opener evaluate the probability of a successful game contract.

== Real club (or diamond) suit ==
If the passed hand has 10+ points and a real club suit (or a diamond suit, when playing two-way Drury), this cannot be shown naturally at the two-level. One possibility is that a jump to 3♣ (or 3♦) shows this hand. An alternative is to use the forcing notrump. A third possibility (and the one recommended when the convention was introduced) is to bid 2♣, then rebid three of the minor. If this last approach is used, opener must be careful about jumping in own suit without extra length.

== Variation for four-card major systems ==
The above examples are suitable for use with five-card major systems such as Standard American. Variations are required for use with four-card major systems such as Acol.

== See also ==
- Strong Notrump After Passing (SNAP)
