= Snapp (disambiguation) =

Snapp is a village in Västerbotten County, Sweden.

Snapp or SNAPP may also refer to:

- Science for Nature and People Partnership, a nature conservation initiative
- Snapp!, a transportation network company operating in Iran
- SNAPPs, an artificially designed polymer

== People ==
- Helen Wyatt Snapp (1918–2013), American aviator
- Henry Snapp (1822–1895), American politician
- Howard M. Snapp (1855–1938), American politician
- Red Snapp (1888–1974), American baseball player
- Wilbur Snapp (1920–2003), American musician

== See also ==
- Snapp House (disambiguation)
- Snapper (disambiguation)
- Snappy (disambiguation)
- Snap (disambiguation)
