= Schnapper =

Schnapper may refer to:

- Antoine Schnapper (1933–2004) French art historian
- Dominique Schnapper (born 1934), French scholar and professor of sociology
- Schnapper Rock, a suburb of North Shore, New Zealand
- Schnapper Island, original name of Snapper Island (New South Wales), Australia
- A local name for Australasian snapper in Victoria, Australia
- A cultivar of the woody shrub Banksia spinulosa

== See also ==
- Snapper (disambiguation)
