= Snapper Island =

Snapper Island may be a reference to:

- Snapper Island (New South Wales) in Sydney Harbour, New South Wales, Australia
- Snapper Island (Queensland) at the mouth of the Daintree River, Queensland, Australia
