= Edward Weller =

Edward Weller may refer to:

- Edward Weller (whaler) (1814–1893), founder, with his brothers, of a whaling station on Otago Harbour
- Edward Weller (cartographer) (1819–1884), British engraver and cartographer
