= Snappy =

Snappy may refer to:

== Computing ==
- Snappy (compression), a compression and decompression library
- Snappy, the former name for Snap, a software tool for the Ubuntu operating system

== Other uses ==
- Snappy Sammy Smoot, a comic book character created and drawn by Skip Williamson
- Snappy The Little Crocodile, English name of the German children's cartoon Schnappi das kleine Krokodil
- Snappy Gifts, a multinational company which specializes in corporate gift giving
- Snappy Smurfling, a character from The Smurfs

== See also ==
- Snappii, a cloud-based, codeless platform for rapid mobile app development
- Snappies, a UK manufacturer of household products, including cling film
- Snap (disambiguation)
