= Snap! (disambiguation) =

Snap! are a German Eurodance group.

Snap! may also refer to:

- Snap! (album), greatest hits album of The Jam
- Snap! (programming language), browser-based programming language

== See also ==
- Snap (disambiguation)
