= Rim Chung =

Korean-American fly fisherman (born 1934)

Rim H Chung
- Born: March 15, 1934; Kum Num, North Korea
- Occupations: Professional fly tier and fisherman
- Years active: 1970-
- Known for: Inventing the RS2

Rim Chung (born March 15, 1934) was a Korean-American fly fisherman. He was born in North Korea. As a child, Chung fished for snapper and rock bass located in the sea with a bamboo rod, according to his friend Frenec Horvath. During the Korean War, Chung and his family fled to South Korea where he lived for seventeen years. Chung moved to Denver, Colorado in 1968 on a business visa.

== Career ==
In 1970, Rim Chung was introduced to flyfishing. Shortly after he designed his own fly and developed the RS2 nymph pattern in 1975. The RS2's body is made out of beaver fur, the tail is made from any dark dun color and the wing is a very light grey web from saddle hackle. The name of the fly is short for “Rim’s Semblance 2." The RS2 became a popular pattern in the flyfishing community because of its similarity to a real-life mayfly nymph. Chung became a self-described better-than-average nymph fisherman in part by studying the techniques of Ralph Smith and Chuck Fothergill. The original version featured natural beaver fur dubbing and saddle hackle for the wing. Chung fished exclusively with the nymph method and used a rod setup that employed two flies simultaneously. Chung advocated the use of light action rods, from zero weight to three weight. Chung has suggested that these rods transmit the best experience while fighting a fish. This fly has been regarded as one of the best flies to use on the Colorado's South Platte River. He also created other variations of this fly including the Plebby and Avatar. These modern versions appeared as more material became available to fly fishermen. Both are similar to the RS2 but with different color patterns and variety in the style of the fly. Chung has a couple of websites dedicated to his RS2 fly and his fly-fishing methods. These websites include videos that demonstrate how to tie the RS2 properly. Several articles and books highlight Rim Chung's work in the fly fishing industry such as Tying Small Flies by Ed Engle, Tying and Fishing Tailwater by Pat Dorsey, and Fly Fishing the South Platte River by Roger Hill. Many anglers in the industry consider the RS2 to be the "best emerger mayfly pattern out there" states Chris Hunt journalist for Trout Unlimited. Rim Chung has been an active fly fisherman who participated in events like the 2019 Fly Fishing Show in Denver, supporting other tiers.

Chung was a successful businessman as well. He opened up a Korean imports shop at the Cinderella City Mall. His business was open until 1987 when he sold it.
