= Snap =

Snap or SNAP may refer to:

== Arts and entertainment ==
- Snap (film), the initial release title for the 2013 film Enter the Dangerous Mind
- Snap (TV series), a children's TV series broadcast by CITV from 1997 to 1999
- The Stanly News and Press, a newspaper in Albemarle, North Carolina, US
- "Snap" (Duty Free), a 1984 TV episode

=== Games and sports ===
- Snap (gridiron football), the start of a play in gridiron football
- Scalable Network Application Package, an online gaming platform
- Pokémon Snap, a 1999 Japanese video game
  - New Pokémon Snap, the 2021 sequel
- Snap, any putdown used in the Dozens

==== Card games ====
- Snap (card game)
- Strong notrump after passing, a contract bridge bidding convention

=== Music ===
- Snap music, a hip-hop subgenre
- Snap!, a German dance music group
- Snap! (album), by the Jam, 1983
- "Snap" (song), by Rosa Linn, 2022
- "Snap", a song by Kevin Federline from Playing with Fire, 2006
- "Snap", a song by Nav from Bad Habits, 2019
- "Snap", a song by Slipknot from Slipknot, 2009 reissue
- "Snap!", a song from the British preschool TV series Boo!

=== Fictional entities ===
- Snap, a character from the Nickelodeon animated television series ChalkZone
- The Snap, a fictional event in the Marvel Cinematic Universe
- Snap, a morning food's product mascot, one of Snap, Crackle and Pop

== Aviation ==
- Dallair Aeronautica FR-100 Snap!, an Italian aerobatic aircraft
- Tecnam Snap, an Italian aerobatic aircraft

== Computing ==
- Snap (computer graphics), an aid for positioning an object relative to grid lines or another object
- Snap (web framework), a Web framework written in Haskell
- Snap Server, a computer storage device
- SNAP Points (software non-functional assessment process), a measurement of non-functional software size
- Snap! (programming language), an educational graphical programming language
- ITK-SNAP, a medical imaging software application
- Sentinel Application Platform, a common software architecture for analysis of Earth observation data provided by ESA
- Subnetwork Access Protocol (SNAP), a network link protocol
- Snap (software), a software packaging and deployment system for Linux
- Core dump or snap dump, a snapshot of the status of a running program or system at a particular moment

== Government programs ==
- Supplemental Nutrition Assistance Program (SNAP), a food program for low-income families administered by the United States Department of Agriculture

== Organizations ==
- Snap Inc., developer of the Snapchat social media application
  - Snapchat, the social media application
- Sarawak National Party (SNAP), a now-defunct, Sarawak-based political party in Malaysia
- Survivors Network of those Abused by Priests, in the United States

== Places ==
- Snap, Kentucky, United States
- Snap, Wiltshire, a deserted village in England

== Science ==
- Snap (physics) or jounce, in physics, the fourth derivative of the position vector with respect to time
- S-Nitroso-N-acetylpenicillamine, a chemical compound
- Schedule for Nonadaptive and Adaptive Personality (SNAP), a questionnaire for personality disorder assessment
- Significant New Alternatives Policy, a U.S. EPA ozone-depleting chemicals program
- Supernova/Acceleration Probe, a proposed spacecraft
- Systems for Nuclear Auxiliary Power, experimental electricity generators in the 1960s
- Snap bean, the unripe, young fruit and protective pods of various cultivars of the common bean
- Soluble NSF attachment protein, a family of proteins involved in vesicle membrane binding
  - Proteins in the SNAP-receptor (SNARE protein) family, including:
    - SNAP23
    - SNAP25
    - SNAP29
    - SNAP91, the genetic that codes for clathrin coat assembly protein AP180
- HT-2157, formerly SNAP-37889, a pharmacological antagonist for galanin receptor 3
- SNAP-94847, a pharmacological antagonist for melanin-concentrating hormone receptor 1

== Products ==
- Snap (Pillow Pal), a stuffed animal reptile from Ty
- Snaps, crispy and light starch puffs manufactured under the Smiths brand
- Bang snaps, a novelty firework

== Other uses ==
- Finger snapping, a thrusting of the fingers together that makes a sharp sound
- Snap (horse), a Thoroughbred racehorse and sire
- Snaps, a shot of alcoholic beverage
- Snap fastener, a clothing fastener

== See also ==
- Bolt snap, a hook with a sliding bolt gate
- Snap election, an election that is called prematurely and earlier than scheduled.
- Snapper (disambiguation)
- Snappy (disambiguation)
