= Snapper =

Snapper(s) may refer to:

== Animals ==
- Lutjanidae, a family of fish known as snappers
  - Lutjanus campechanus, a fish found in the Gulf of Mexico and the Atlantic coast of the United States
  - Bigeye snapper (Lutjanus lutjanus), a fish that primarily lives in the Pacific and Indian Oceans, sometimes known as simply "Snapper"
  - Cubera snapper (Lutjanus cyanopterus), native to the western Atlantic Ocean
- Fishes from other families including:
  - Australasian snapper, Pagrus auratus, also known as silver seabream
  - Eastern nannygai, also known as red snapper, Centroberyx affinis
  - Bluefish (Pomatomus saltatrix), of which the smallest are often known as "snappers"
  - Sebastes, some species of which are known as "Pacific snapper" or "red snapper"
- Chelydridae, a family of freshwater turtles of which both extant species are known as snapping turtles, informally shortened to "snapper"
  - Common snapping turtle
  - Alligator snapping turtle
- Sistrurus catenatus, also known as black snapper, a snake

== Arts and entertainment ==
- The Snapper (novel), a 1990 novel by Roddy Doyle
- The Snapper (film), a film based on the above novel
- Snapper (video game), a faithful clone of Pac-Man for the BBC Micro
- Snapper Music, a UK record label
- Snapper (band), a New Zealand indie rock band
  - Snapper (EP)
- Snapper Carr, a character in the DC Universe
- Snapper Foster, a character on the soap opera The Young and the Restless
- Bang snaps or "snappers", a type of novelty firework

== Military ==
- HMS Snapper, eight ships of the Royal Navy
- USS Snapper, three ships of the United States Navy
- 3M6 Shmel, an anti-tank missile with NATO reporting name AT-1 Snapper
- Sopwith Snapper, a British First World War prototype fighter aircraft
- The Snappers, a nickname of the East Yorkshire Regiment

== Places ==
- Snapper Creek, Florida
- Snapper Island (New South Wales), Australia, in Sydney Harbour
- Snapper Island (Queensland), Australia, at the mouth of the Daintree River
- Snapper, a hamlet in the UK that was served by Snapper Halt railway station

== Sports ==
- Long snapper, a specialized player in gridiron football
- Steve "Snapper" Jones (1942–2017), American basketball player and television analyst

== Surname ==
- Ernst Snapper (1913–2017), Dutch-American mathematician

== Other uses ==
- Snapper Inc., a residential lawn care and snow removal equipment company
- Snapper card, a New Zealand contactless smartcard and USB device

== See also ==
- Red snapper (disambiguation)
- Snap (disambiguation)
