= Aldbourne =

Village in Wiltshire, England

Coordinates: 51.479°N 01.620°W

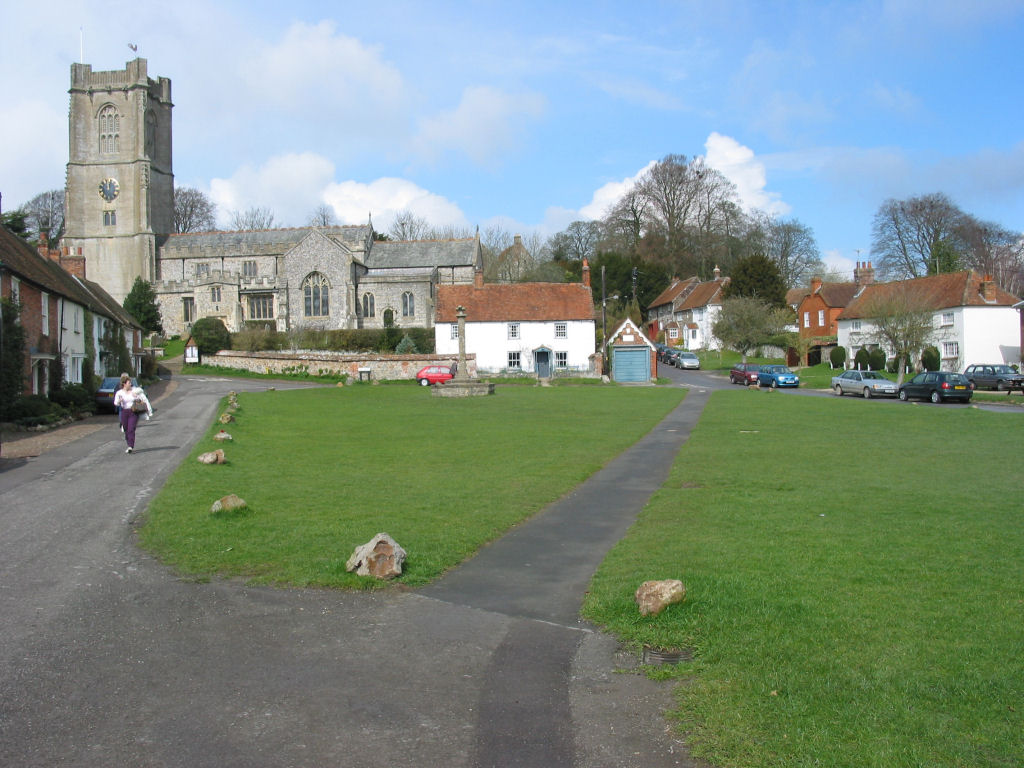
- Houses round the village green, overlooked by the church

- Location within Wiltshire
- Population: 1,833 (2011 Census)
- OS grid reference: SU265756
- Unitary authority: Wiltshire
- Ceremonial county: Wiltshire
- Region: South West
- Country: England
- Sovereign state: United Kingdom
- Post town: Marlborough
- Postcode district: SN8
- Dialling code: 01672
- Police: Wiltshire
- Fire: Dorset and Wiltshire
- Ambulance: South Western
- UK Parliament: East Wiltshire
- Website: Parish Council

Aldbourne (/ˈɔːldbɔːrn/ AWLD-born) is a village and civil parish about 6 miles (10 km) north-east of Marlborough, Wiltshire, England. It is in a valley on the south slope of the Lambourn Downs – part of the North Wessex Downs Area of Outstanding Natural Beauty. From here an unnamed winterbourne flows south to join the River Kennet 4 miles (6 km) away near Ramsbury. The 2011 Census recorded the parish population as 1,833. The parish includes the hamlets of Upper Upham and Woodsend and part of the hamlet of Preston, which straddles the boundary with Ramsbury. The village of Snap became deserted in the early 20th century.

== History ==
=== Early periods ===
Evidence of prehistoric activity on the chalk downs includes a barrow cemetery north-west of the village, a Bronze Age cross dyke to the north, and a field system in the valley around Snap.

There are extensive prehistoric or Romano-British field systems around Upper Upham. The boundaries of the modern parish follow Roman roads to the north-east (Ermin Way) and to the west (an un-named road from Cirencester to Mildenhall). Domesday Book in 1086 recorded a large settlement at Aldeborne, with 156 households, four mills and a church. Lewisham Castle is a small medieval ringwork about a mile and a half south-west of the village. It is not certain whether it was in fact a castle.

The name Aldbourne derives from the Old English Ealdaingburna meaning 'stream connected with Ealda'. It could perhaps derive from the Old English Aldingburna meaning 'the old stream'.

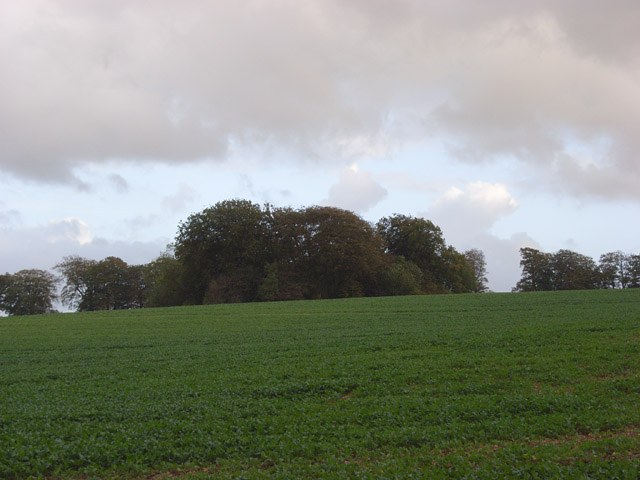
Lewisham Castle

The Wiltshire Victoria County History traces the ownership of estates including Aldbourne manor, which was unusually large until it was broken up in the 17th century. Landowners include Rotrou IV, Count of Perche and descendants in the 12th century; William Longespée, 3rd Earl of Salisbury and descendants in the 13th and 14th; and trustees for the City of London for a short time in the 17th. An estate at Upham was given by Longespée to Lacock Abbey in 1249, and after the dissolution was bought in 1540 by John Goddard, whose descendants went on to be lords of the manor of Swindon.

Aldbourne was the wealthiest parish in Selkley hundred in the Middle Ages, and in 1377 the parish had 332 taxpayers. The population peaked around 1,600 in the mid-19th century, fell to 980 by the 1921 census, and has gradually risen since then.

In the English Civil War a Royalist force led by Prince Rupert fought a Parliamentarian force in a skirmish at Aldbourne Chase on 18 September 1643, two days before the First Battle of Newbury.

Fustian, a heavy cotton cloth, was woven in the village from at least the late 17th century. The industry was affected by a fire in 1760 and declined after the 1790s.

=== Since 1800 ===
A Baptist chapel opened in 1841 in Back Lane and was rebuilt as New Zoar Chapel in 1868. It was sold in 1914 and demolished some time after 1931; its burial ground survives.

A Primitive Methodist chapel opened in West Street about 1840 and a new chapel was built on the site in 1906. Wesleyan Methodists built a chapel in Lottage Road in 1807, which was rebuilt in 1844. In 1968 the two congregations combined to build Aldbourne Methodist Church in Lottage Road. The chapel in West Street was demolished in 1982.

The Swindon, Marlborough and Andover Railway (later the Midland and South Western Junction Railway) opened between Swindon and Marlborough in 1881, alongside the Roman road in the west of the parish, just over the parish boundary. There was a station and small goods yard at Ogbourne. The line became part of the Great Western Railway in 1923 and closed in 1961, then dismantled.

During the Second World War, U.S. Army paratroopers of Easy Company, 2nd Battalion, 506th Parachute Infantry Regiment, 101st Airborne Division were based at Aldbourne from late 1943 to mid-1944, in preparation for the Normandy landings in June 1944 and Operation Market Garden in September. Both Easy Company and the village featured in the 2001 HBO miniseries Band of Brothers, though scenes for Aldbourne were filmed at the village of Hambleden, near the Oxfordshire town of Henley-on-Thames.

Two disused village pumps survive in the village.

=== Bell foundry ===
For at least 130 years Aldbourne had a bell foundry. Master-founders at Aldbourne included Robert Cor (active 1694–1724), William Cor (active 1696–1722), Oliver Cor (active 1725–1727), John Cor (active 1728–1750), John Stares (active 1744–1746), Edward Read (active 1751–57), Edne Witts (active 1759–1774), Robert I Wells (active 1760–81), Robert II Wells (active 1781–1793) and James Wells (active 1792–1826). Bells cast by the Cor and Wells families survive at parish churches including Alvescot, Ashbury, Berwick St John, Blewbury, Church Hanborough, East Challow, Drayton, East Lockinge, Faringdon, Farnborough, Great Coxwell, Horspath, Longworth, Marcham, Marsh Baldon, St Nicolas Newbury, Northleach, Uffington, Seend, Sutton Courtenay, West Hanney and others. The ten bells at St Nicolas in Newbury include the only surviving full set of eight bells cast by James Wells of Aldbourne (in 1803); the tenor bell weighing 21cwt (slightly heavier than a ton) is the heaviest bell cast at Aldbourne.

== Parish church ==
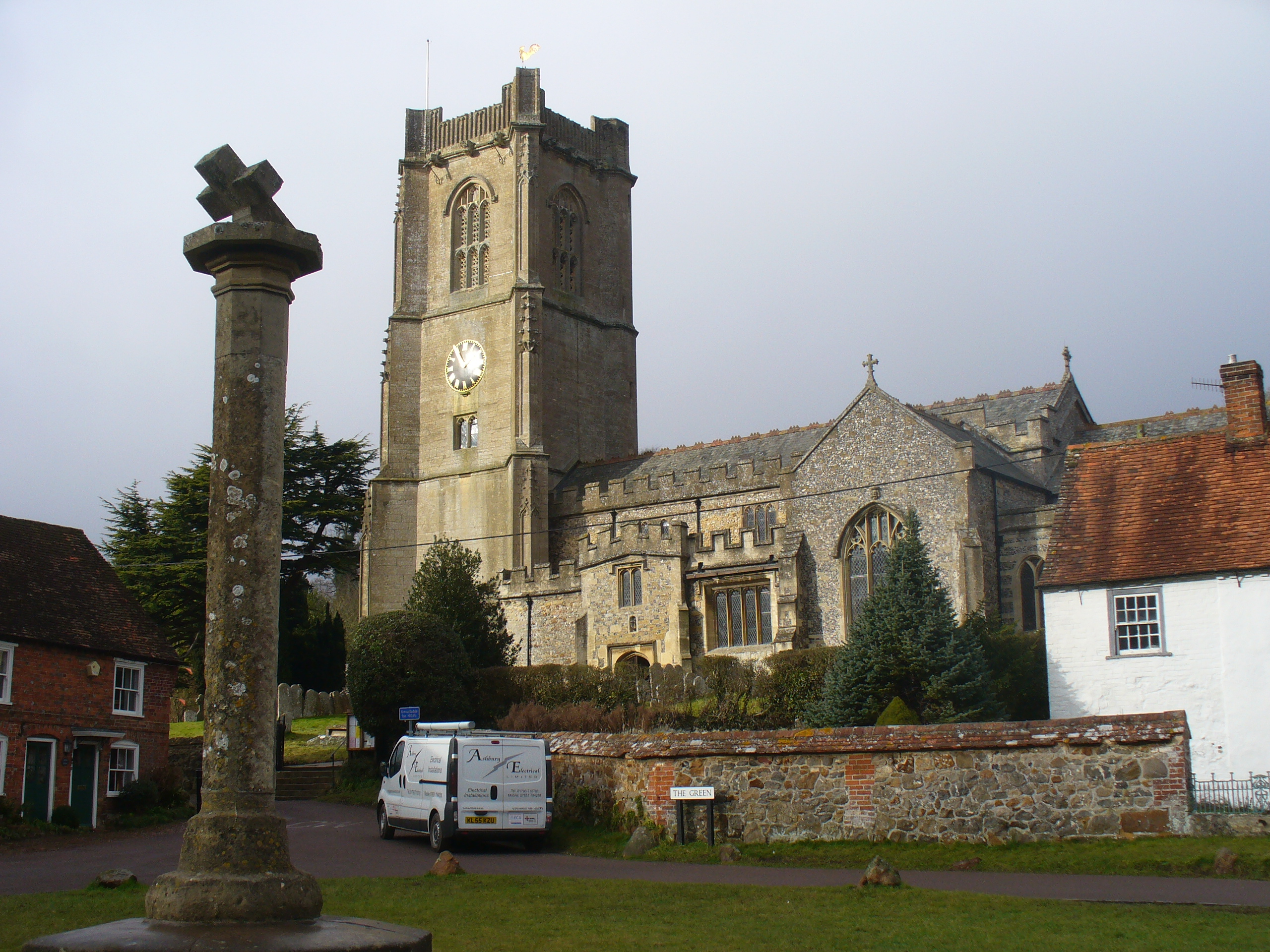
Village cross and St Michael's Church

The medieval Church of England parish church of St Michael, overlooking the village green, is a Grade I listed building described by Nikolaus Pevsner as "large and interesting". The nave and aisles were rebuilt in the first half of the 13th century, reusing fragments from a Norman church: one scalloped capital in the north arcade, and voussoirs in three of the arches in the south arcade. The south doorway of the nave is also from the 12th century, although parts of its stonework were replaced in the 19th. The chancel is Early English, with north and south chapels, and a sanctuary with lancet windows.

The Perpendicular Gothic three-stage tower was added in 1460 at the expense of Richard Goddard of Upham House. Until then the church probably had a central tower. It is ashlar, has angled buttresses and transomed three-light bell openings, with gargoyles above. There are transepts with three-light windows, a tall south porch – originally two-storey – and a bay between the porch and south transept. There was also a north porch until the building was restored by William Butterfield in 1863–1867; the work included new roofs for the nave and chancel, with the 15th-century roofs kept as a ceilings. The outside walls are of flint and limestone with some chequer-work and sarsen. They are crenellated. The roofs are lead and slate.

The font is probably from the 15th century, and the hexagonal carved wooden pulpit from about 1600. There are eight bells: two from the early 15th century, two from the 17th, and four cast locally in the 18th, one of them recast in 1915. Details of the gravestones and burial plots in the churchyard were recorded digitally in 2017–2018.

In 1956 the incumbent was authorised to hold both Aldbourne and Baydon, and the two benefices were united in 1965. Ramsbury was added in 1973, and today the church is one of six in the Whitton grouping.

== Notable buildings ==
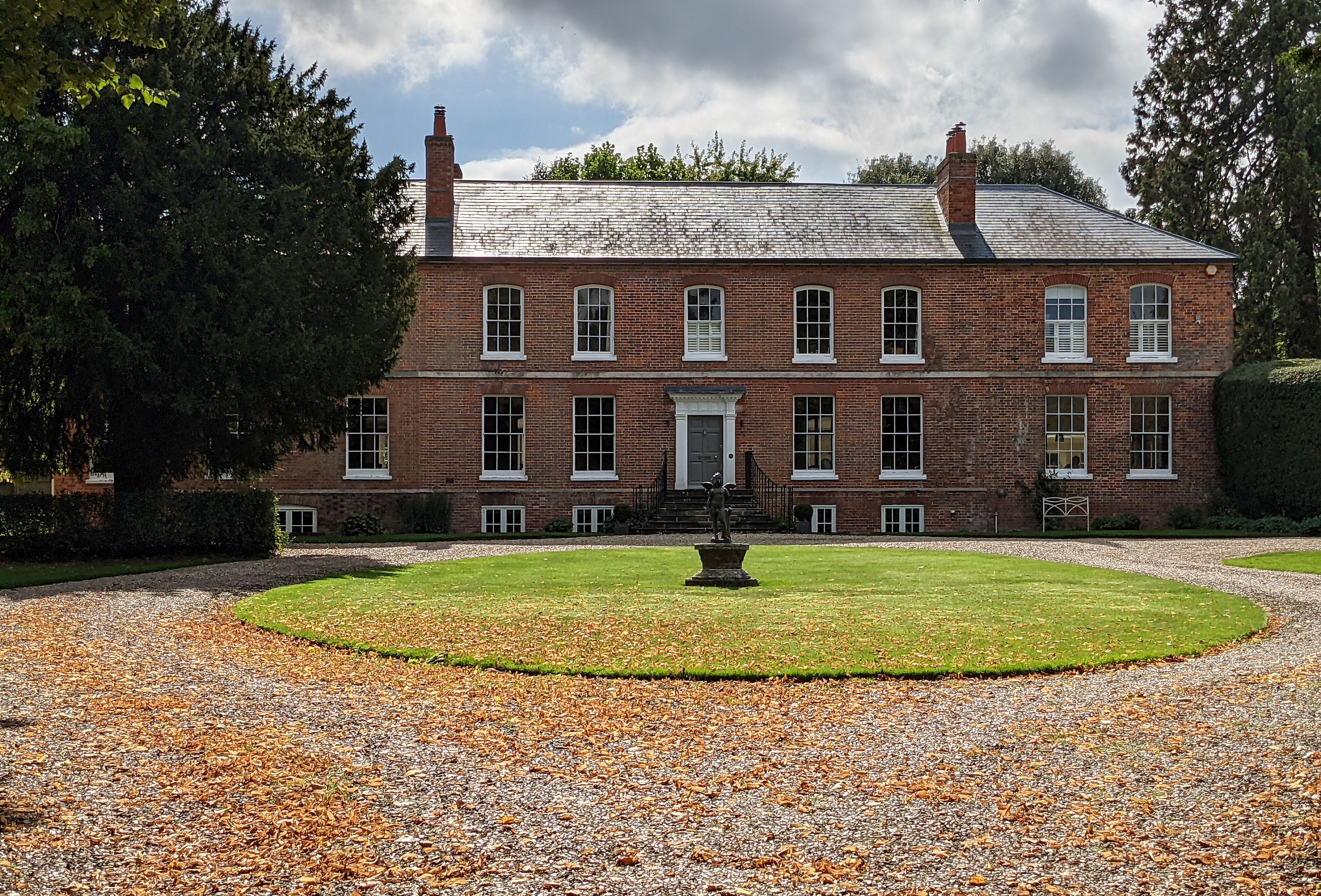
The Old Manor

Court House, in its own grounds north of the church, has at its core a 16th-century farmhouse in flint and chalkstone; additions were made in brick in the 18th century and later. North of the house is an 18th-century carriage house and stables, with a small central clock-tower. A bell foundry was established in the grounds, probably in 1694, and continued to operate there until the 1760s. From 1809 to 1956 the house was used as the vicarage.

The Old Manor (formerly the Old Rectory), set behind brick walls on the south side of The Square, is a five-bay brick house from about 1740, with two further bays added on each side in the early 19th century.

Upham House, in the hamlet north-west of Aldbourne village, was built in 1599 for the Goddard family. The main part of the house, built in gritstone and flint, has a five-bay south-east front. It was Grade II* listed in 1966 and is now three dwellings.

West Leaze, on Ogbourne Road was built for Labour Party politicians Hugh Dalton and his wife in 1929 as one of the most radical 20th-century concrete houses to be built. It was designed by Irish born architect Frederick Edward Bradshaw MacManus who was working in the office of Sir John Burnet.

== Governance ==
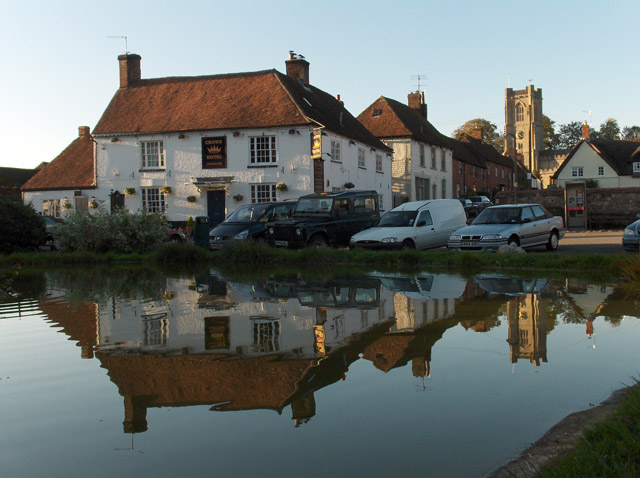
Part of the village pond, with The Crown behind

The parish has an elected parish council. It is within the area of the Wiltshire Council unitary authority, which performs the major local-government functions, and the Aldbourne and Ramsbury electoral ward, which includes the adjacent parishes of Baydon, Froxfield and Ramsbury. The 2011 Census gave a ward population of 5,231. For Westminster elections, the parish is in the East Wiltshire constituency.

== Amenities ==
An open space in the centre of the village known as The Square has had a pond since at least the 18th century. Aldbourne has two public houses, the Blue Boar and the Crown, and a volunteer-run sports and social club. There is a Co-op supermarket and a village shop that includes a post office and a cafe. Aldbourne has had a village library since the 1930s, housed for the last few decades in South Street.

The village primary school, St Michael's C of E (Aided) School, was built in 1963 on the site of a national school that opened in 1858.

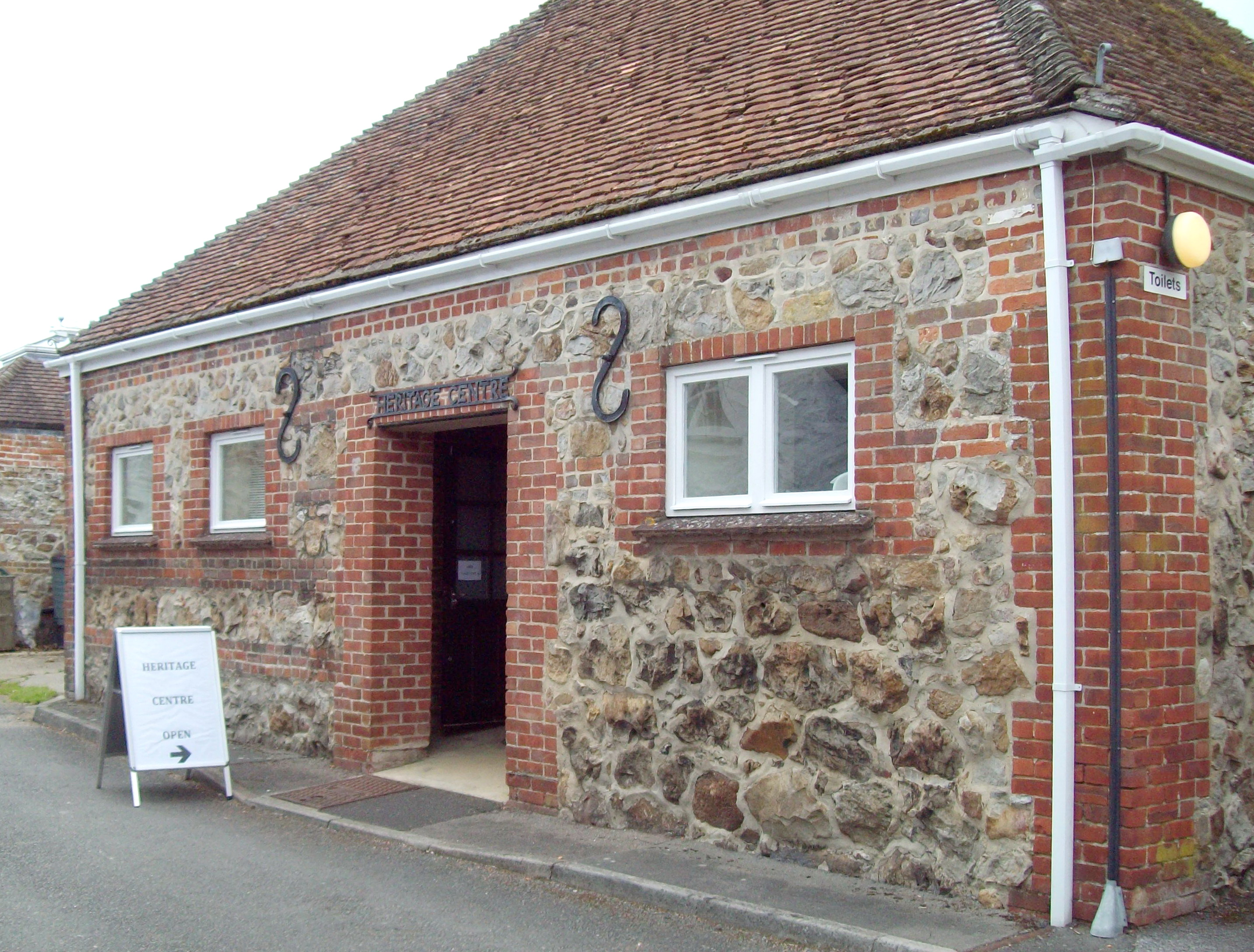
Aldbourne Heritage Centre

Aldbourne Heritage Centre, next to the Crown Inn, is a museum run by the Aldbourne Community Heritage Group. It displays a changing array of exhibits from Aldbourne's history, ranging from Stone Age flints and medieval documents to 19th and 20th-century photographs.

Aldbourne Band is a brass band that has won numerous national competitions.

== People ==
Aldbourne people are nicknamed "Dabchicks" after the little grebe.

Johnny Morris (1916–1999), narrator and TV presenter known for the Animal Magic children's programmes, was employed as a manager at an Aldbourne farm in the 1940s before becoming a full-time freelance broadcaster in the 1950s; he lived in Aldbourne until late in life.

Margaret Longhurst (1882–1958), the first female keeper in a major British museum, retired here and is remembered in the village's heritage centre. Aldbourne was the home of the novelist Mavis Cheek in 2003–2015. Earlier residents included Jankel Adler (1895–1949), a Jewish Polish painter and printmaker who lived his last few years at Whitley Cottage, where he had a studio; Ruth Dalton (1890–1966), a Labour politician; and Anthony Marreco (1915–2006), a barrister and founding director of Amnesty International.

The author and historian Gerald Brenan and his American wife, the poet and novelist Gamel Woolsey, lived in Aldbourne from the late 1930s to 1953. Gerald's long-time friend John Hope-Johnstone, a photographer with links to the Bloomsbury Group, lived in a cottage attached to their house until his death in 1970.

Hilda Hanbury (1872–1939), known for voluntary work, bought Upham House at Upper Upham in 1909 and restored and enlarged the house and its gardens. She became Lady Currie when her husband James Currie was knighted in 1920, and stood unsuccessfully for the Liberals at Devizes in the 1922 general election.

The classicist and educator Mary Creighton Bailey moved to Aldbourne after retirement, and died there. Composer David Gow and his wife Margaret lived in Aldbourne, having moved from Axford.

== Television ==
In 1971, Aldbourne was the filming location for the Doctor Who story The Dæmons, starring Jon Pertwee. The village in the story was called Devil's End. In 1992, Reeltime Pictures filmed a direct-to-video documentary called Return to Devil's End in Aldbourne, featuring Christopher Barry (director of the 1971 story) with cast members Jon Pertwee, Nicholas Courtney, Richard Franklin and John Levene.

Aldbourne was the filming location of the 2014 E4 television drama Glue, portraying the village of Overton. The village was the filming location for Vodafone's Christmas advertisement in 2018.

The 2023 Time Team special episode, titled "Digging Band of Brothers", featured excavation of the site of the military camp at Aldbourne by archaeologists including participants in Operation Nightingale.

== Sources and further reading ==
- Pevsner, Nikolaus; Cherry, Bridget (revision) (1975) [1963]. Wiltshire. The Buildings of England. Harmondsworth: Penguin Books. pp. 81–82. ISBN 0-14-0710-26-4.
- Gandy, Ida (1975). The heart of a village: An intimate history of Aldbourne. Moonraker Press. ISBN 978-0239001481.
