= Woodsend =

Hamlet in Wiltshire, England

Coordinates: 51.482°N 1.683°W

- Location within Wiltshire
- OS grid reference: SU221759
- Civil parish: Aldbourne
- Unitary authority: Wiltshire
- Ceremonial county: Wiltshire
- Region: South West
- Country: England
- Sovereign state: United Kingdom
- Post town: MARLBOROUGH
- Postcode district: SN8
- Dialling code: 01672
- Police: Wiltshire
- Fire: Dorset and Wiltshire
- Ambulance: South Western
- UK Parliament: East Wiltshire

Woodsend is a hamlet in the civil parish of Aldbourne in Wiltshire, England. Its nearest town is Marlborough, which is approximately 4.5 miles (7.2 km) south-west from the hamlet.

Woodsend had a population of 84 in 1851 but decreased in size in the early 20th century. A Wesleyan Methodist chapel was built around 1845 and closed in 1913. A National school for about 20 pupils was opened in 1855 and closed before 1913.
