= Battle of Aldbourne Chase =

Battle in 1643 during the English Civil War

Coordinates: 51.477°N 1.677°W

- Part of the First English Civil War
Date	18 September 1643
Location	Aldbourne, Wiltshire
Result	Inconclusive

Belligerents
Royalists	Parliamentarians

Commanders and leaders
Prince Rupert	Earl of Essex

Strength
3,000 horse	5,000 foot 2,000 horse 15–20 cannons

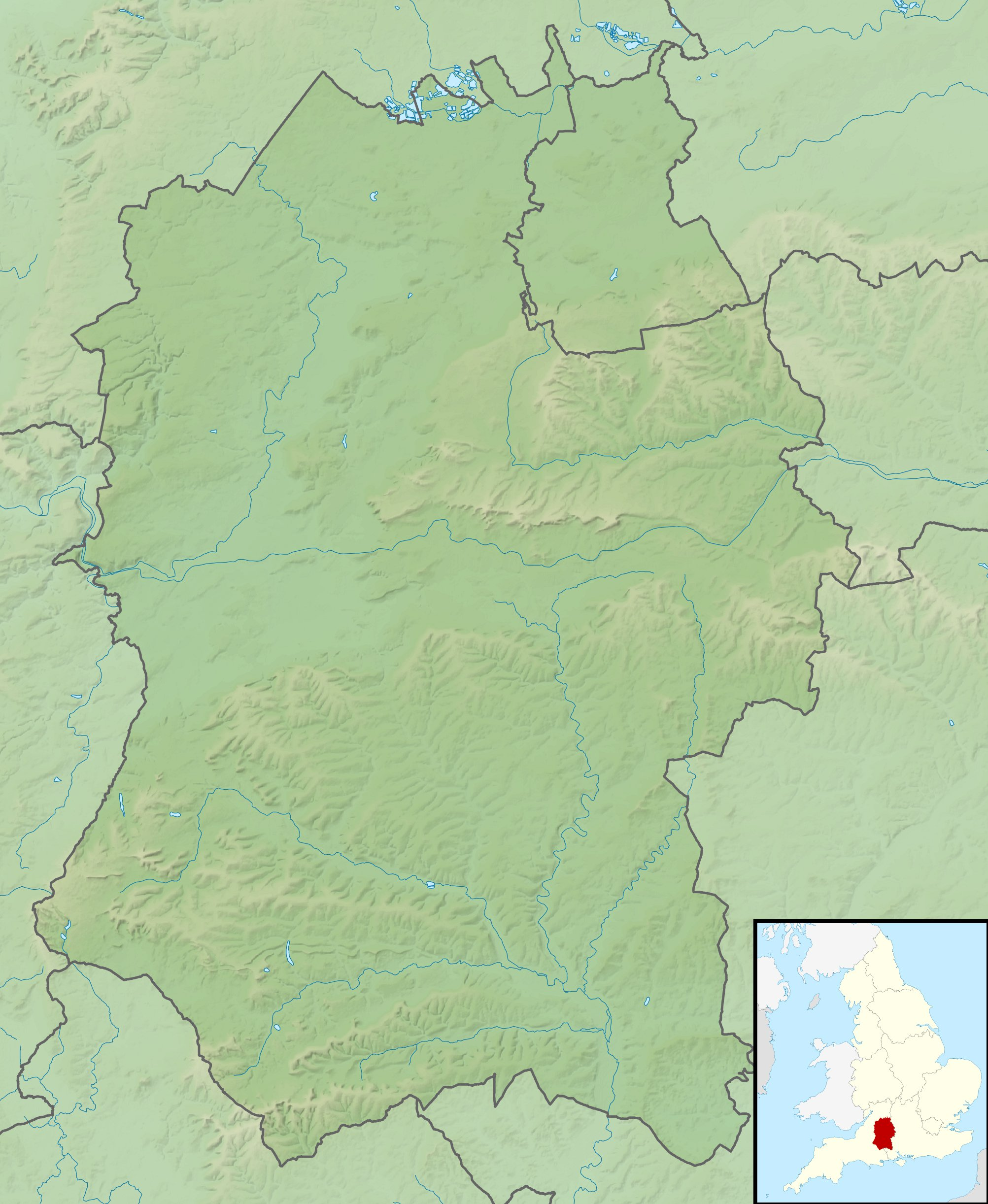
Wiltshire County

The Battle of Aldbourne Chase was a relatively small battle of the First English Civil War that occurred on 18 September 1643. In the skirmish the Royalist cavalry led by Prince Rupert attacked the extended columns of the Parliamentarian army of the Earl of Essex at Aldbourne Chase, Wiltshire, as he was attempting to get his army to London.

The battle in and of itself was inconclusive, but it allowed the Royalists to get to Newbury ahead of Essex and ultimately forced the Parliamentarian army into a major confrontation.

== Background ==
After relieving the siege of Gloucester, the Earl of Essex needed to return to London with his army intact. To do so, Essex first chose to travel north to Tewkesbury in an attempt to draw the Royalist forces near Gloucester off his intended route back to London. After King Charles and the Royalist army followed, Essex turned south and travelled through Cheltenham to Cirencester where on 16 September he attacked and captured the Royalist garrison. At that time, Essex thought that he was far ahead of the Royalist army and slowed the pace of his army as they marched toward Swindon.

When King Charles realized that Essex was attempting to travel directly to London, he sent Prince Rupert ahead with the cavalry in an attempt to intercept the Parliamentarian army before it could link up with reinforcements coming from London.

== Battle ==
Early on 18 September, Rupert's cavalry caught the Parliamentarians as they were crossing Aldbourne Chase, approximately two miles north-west of the village of Aldbourne. Rupert came upon long columns of Parliamentarian infantry, ambling along with large intervals between the individual divisions. Given such an opportunity, the Royalist cavalry immediately began a series of charges at the Parliamentarian foot. Although the Parliamentarian cavalry soon joined in the fray, the Royalists began to take a heavy toll on the Parliamentary infantry units. The Royalist charges continued as the Parliamentary foot struggled to unite into a single fighting force. The Royalists began to prevail despite a charge by Colonel Harvey of the Parliamentarians.

As they were able, the Parliamentarians began a retreat off the down, starting with their baggage and followed by their foot. The battle ultimately continued through the village of Aldbourne where the Parliamentarians destroyed ammunition wagons to prevent their capture. Finally, in combination with their infantry, the Parliamentarians were able to hold off the Royalists and even drive them away.

== Aftermath ==
When Essex felt it was safe to continue the march, he chose not to continue on the London road, but rather to cross the River Kennet and use it as a barrier as he travelled through Hungerford to Newbury. As a result of the skirmish at Aldbourne Chase and the alternative route taken, the Parliamentarians were delayed and the King's army arrived and occupied Newbury on 19 September just before the Parliamentarians arrived. The delay at Aldbourne Chase thus ultimately blocked Essex from London and led to the First Battle of Newbury of 20 September.
