= Dallair Aeronautica FR-100 Snap! =

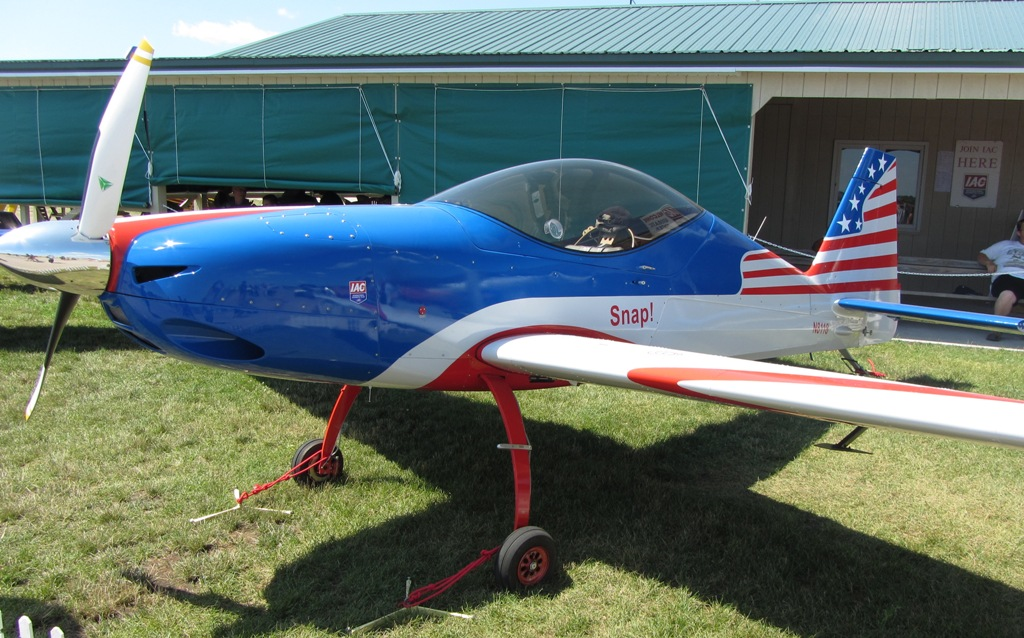

General information
- Type: Aerobatic aircraft
- National origin: Italy
- Manufacturer: Dallair Aeronautica
- Designer: Fabio Russo

History
- Manufactured: until 2013
- Variant: Tecnam Snap

The Dallair Aeronautica FR-100 Snap! is a homebuilt aerobatic aircraft that can be certified in multiple categories.

== Design and development ==
The Snap! is imported to the United States and may be certified as an Experimental-Exhibition model, S-LSA, or Experimental LSA.

The Snap! is a single-seat low-wing taildragger. It is rated for 6gs positive and 3 gs negative g-force. The fuselage is constructed of welded steel tubing with a carbon fiber covering. The wings are all-aluminum. The aircraft has inverted fuel and oil systems.

Dallair production ended in 2013 and production was assumed by Tecnam as the Tecnam Snap.

== Variants ==
FR-01
Version for the European market.
FR-100 Snap!
Version for the US market.

== Specifications (FR100 Snap!) ==
Data from AVweb

General characteristics

- Capacity: one
- Empty weight: 285 kg (628 lb)
- Powerplant: 1 × EPA Power modified Rotax 912 , 97 kW (130 hp)

Performance

- Maximum speed: 290 km/h (180 mph, 160 kn)
- Stall speed: 93 km/h (58 mph, 50 kn)
