= Science for Nature and People Partnership =

Conservation partnership

- Abbreviation: SNAPP
- Formation: 2013
- Founder: The Nature Conservancy; Wildlife Conservation Society; National Center for Ecological Analysis and Synthesis
- Type: Environmental partnership
- Headquarters: University of California, Santa Barbara, Santa Barbara, California, United States
- Region served: Worldwide
- Key people: Jensen Reitz Montambault (Executive Director)
- Main organ: Expert Working Groups
- Affiliations: World Bank, Mercy Corps, Swiss Re

The Science for Nature and People Partnership (SNAPP) is an initiative that aims to rapidly develop models that will underpin the next phase of nature conservation and sustainable development. It works with public, voluntary and private sector organizations around the world to transform the relationship between people and nature.

SNAPP's executive director is conservation scientist Jensen Reitz Montambault.

== History ==
SNAPP was founded as a partnership between The Nature Conservancy (TNC), the Wildlife Conservation Society (WCS) and the National Center for Ecological Analysis and Synthesis (NCEAS) at the University of California, Santa Barbara. It was launched at the Clinton Global Initiative in 2013 in response to global challenges including rapid population growth, climate change and economic development.

== Activities ==
SNAPP funds, convenes and supports Expert Working Groups addressing global challenges in four focus areas:

- Ecosystem Services and Biodiversity Benefits.
- Food Security and Nature
- Water Security and Nature
- Community Resilience and Climate Change

SNAPP has 34 working groups working across the world, each with a specific problem to address in 24 months. These are supported by organizations like the World Bank, NGOs like Mercy Corps, and businesses like Swiss Re.

=== Ecosystem Services and Biodiversity Benefits ===
Ivory Trade

On September 25, 2015, the Chinese government announced a ban on its domestic ivory trade, for which 22,000 elephants are killed each year. The announcement later lead to a drop in ivory prices. The SNAPP Chinese Ivory Trade Working Group is conducting the first comprehensive analysis of the industry to support the government with implementing the ban.

Natural Capital Accounting Working Group

The Natural Capital Accounting Working Group is working with the government of Rwanda in support of the country's Economic Development and Poverty Reduction Strategies, Biodiversity Strategy and Action Plans, and Poverty and Environment Initiatives.

Evidence-based Conservation

This group, including experts from Conservation International, European Centre for Environment and Human Health, and the World Bank, has assessed the evidence base for how conservation benefits human well-being, for example health and education. The study was published in Nature.

=== Food Security and Nature ===
Sustainable Aquaculture

Experts including from the National Oceanic and Atmospheric Administration and Stanford University are establishing the food production capacity of sustainable aquaculture, and working with industry and governments to develop best practice guidelines for the growing industry.

Fisheries Measures

Led by Ray Hilborn of the University of Washington, this group is working on improving understanding of the current status of key fish stocks. They are also systematically identifying factors that lead to good outcomes in fisheries management.

Data-Limited Fisheries

Studies have proven that fisheries with reliable stock assessments tend to be better managed, but this accounts for less than 1% of fisheries worldwide. To counteract the extensive overfishing practices that threaten the health of many of the world's fish stocks, the Data-Limited Fisheries Working Group examines how new, inexpensive approaches to assess data-limited fisheries can be globally implemented.

Sustainable Agriculture

The Sustainable Agriculture Working Group examines how agricultural output can be intensified sustainably in the Southern Agricultural Growth Corridor of Tanzania (SAGCOT), which links eastern Zambia and the interior of Tanzania to the Indian Ocean.

=== Water Security and Nature ===
Ecological Drought

Supported by the United States Geological Survey, the Ecological Drought Working Group is synthesizing the latest scientific understanding of long-term drought in the western US for federal, state and local governments, and businesses.

Sharing Water

The Sharing Water Working Group is identifying the costs and benefits of multi-objective water agreements in 2-4 pilot watersheds in the Western United States.

=== Community Resilience and Climate Change ===
Coastal Defenses

At present, millions of dollars are spent on artificial cement coastal barriers that fail to provide long-term disaster protection and further harm damaged ecosystems. The Coastal Defenses Working Group has built a database of projects around the world that use green infrastructure and their approaches and cost-effectiveness. With the assistance of the World Bank, the project will identify where nature has the greatest value in defending the world's coasts.

== Donors ==
SNAPP has been supported by Shirley and Harry Hagey, Steve and Roberta Denning, Seth Neiman, the Gordon and Betty Moore Foundation, Ward W. and Priscilla B. Woods, and the David and Lucile Packard Foundation.

== See also ==
- National Center for Ecological Analysis and Synthesis
- The Nature Conservancy
- Wildlife Conservation Society
