= USS Snapper =

USS Snapper has been the name of more than one United States Navy ship, and may refer to:

- USS Snapper (Submarine No. 16), a submarine commissioned in 1910, renamed USS C-5 (SS-16) in 1911, and decommissioned in 1919
- USS Snapper (SP-2714), a patrol boat in commission from 1918 to 1919
- USS Snapper (SS-185), a submarine in commission from 1937 to 1945
