= Snappii =

- Type: Private
- Founded: 2010
- Founder: Alex Bakman (CEO)
- Headquarters: Seabrook, NH, U.S.
- Area served: Global
- Products: Rapid mobile app development tools
- Website: Official Website

Snappii (sometimes stylized SnAPPii) is a cloud-based, codeless platform for rapid mobile app development largely for businesses and enterprises. As of 2015, the company has helped produce 26,000 mobile apps in 29 different industries and 17 languages. Some Snappii-produced apps include a Starbucks location finder, a public safety app for college campuses, and a mobile PDF form uploader. Snappii can be used on both iOS and Android devices.

== History ==
Snappii was founded in 2010 by Alex Bakman, who is its CEO. The Snappii platform was launched in 2011, primarily as a tool for iPhone app creation. The company's iPad and Android app creation systems were still in beta in November 2011. In 2012, Snappii added more compatibility and support for Android devices. Also in 2012, customers created the 6,000th app using the Snappii platform.

In 2015, the Snappii released a series of new features ranging from audio and video support to enhanced charting capabilities. They also announced a new offer called "5 Weeks-$5K-Guaranteed App," which guarantees customers a custom native app within five weeks for $5,000. In August 2015, the company raised $250,000 in investor funding. As of 2015, the Snappii platform has produced around 26,000 applications in 17 languages for companies in 29 different industries.

== Products ==
Snappii offers a cloud-based, codeless platform for developing business and enterprise mobile applications on iOS and Android devices. Users (including non-programmers) can create their own apps using WYSIWYG formatting rather than source code. Snappii itself can also create custom native apps for clients. Whether the client opts to create their own app or enlists the help of Snappii programmers, they must pay a monthly hosting fee. Snappii has helped develop apps for companies in 29 different industries, including health care, construction, public safety, retail, oil and gas, and others. Features on the Snappii platform include audio and video support, charting capabilities, and the ability to upload PDF forms (via the My PDF Form Manager app).
