= Snapp House =

Snapp House may refer to:

- Snapp House (Buechel, Kentucky), listed on the National Register of Historic Places in Jefferson County, Kentucky
- Snapp House (Fishers Hill, Virginia), listed on the National Register of Historic Places in Shenandoah County, Virginia
