= Snappy Gifts =

Multinational corporate and consumer gifting company

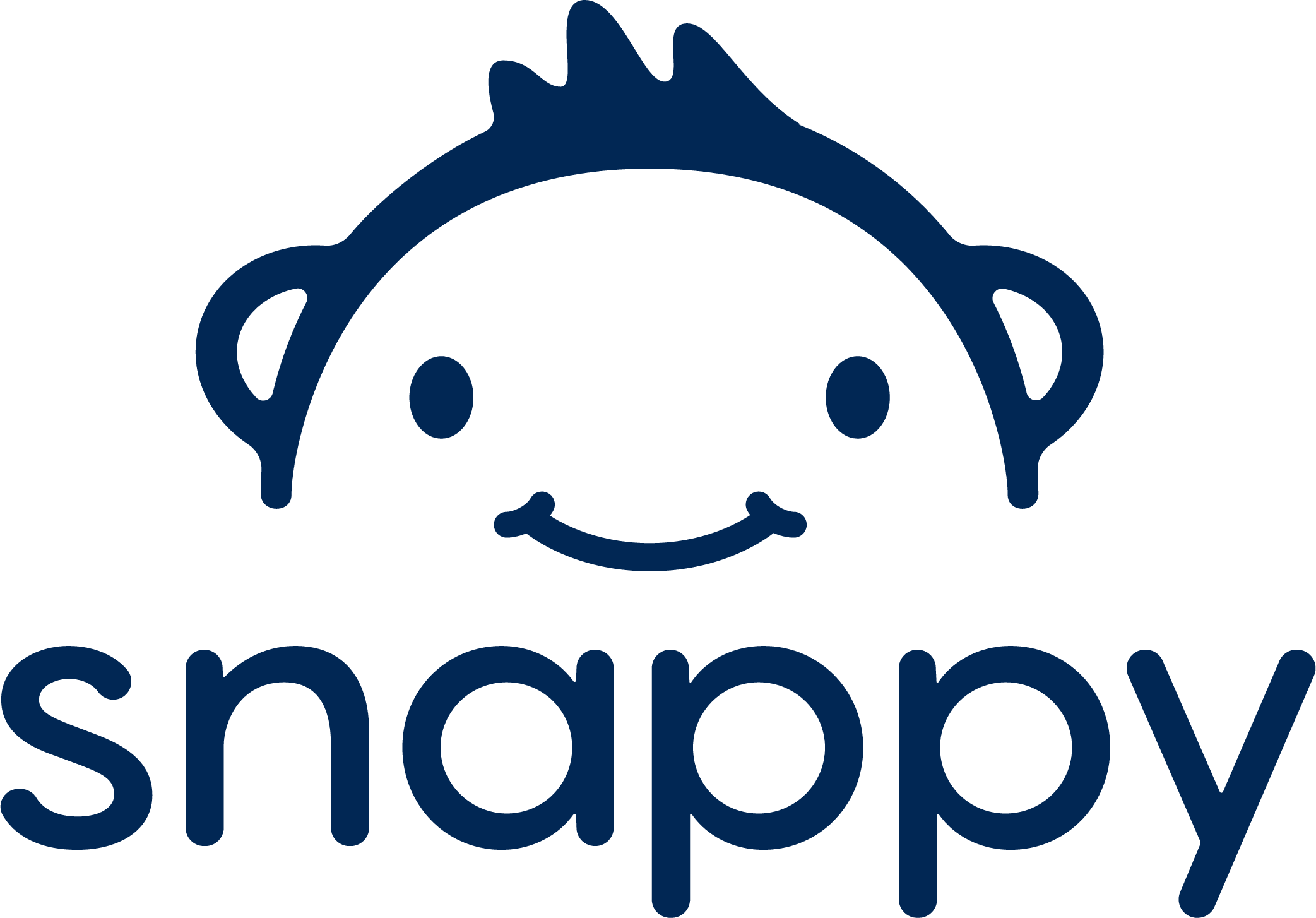
- Type: Private company
- Industry: Internet; Enterprise software; Apps; Human resources; Gift Cards
- Founded: August 1, 2015
- Founders: Dvir Cohen; Hani Goldstein
- Headquarters: New York City, United States
- Key people: Hani Goldstein (CEO); Dvir Cohen (CTO)
- Products: Snappy platform for corporate gifting; Consumer gifting platform
- Revenue: ▼US$30 million (2023)
- Total assets: ▲US$104.8 million (2022)
- Number of employees: 200+ (2023)
- Website: snappy.com

Snappy Gifts is a multinational company based in New York. The company, founded in 2015, provides companies with an online system to offer personalized gifts to their employees. As of October 2022, the company also offers an online gifting platform for individual consumers.

== History ==
Snappy Gifts was founded in 2015 by Dvir Cohen and Hani Goldstein in San Francisco and later moved its headquarters to New York. In 2016, TechCrunch described Snappy as a gifting platform that allowed recipients to swap gifts before shipment. Initially, the company raised 1.6 million dollars and started off focusing on "personal client gifting" but in 2017 shifted its business model to corporate gifting while offering an enterprise version of its platform.

The company, which was established in San Francisco and later moved its headquarters to New York, opened an additional branch in Tel-Aviv.

In 2017, Snappy was included in Retail Accelerator XRC Labs' third cohort of startups.

In late 2018, a company survey detailing the top 25 worst corporate gifts was featured in Business News Daily and Fortune Magazine.

By 2019, the company raised an additional 8.5 million dollars in a funding round which was led by 83North and Hearst Ventures.

In September 2019, Snappy Gifts was listed in Forbes Magazine's list of "10 Most Promising Young Israeli Startups in New York".

In 2020, Snappy raised $25 million in a Series B funding round led by Saban Ventures.

Snappy Gifts partners with many globally-known companies such as Microsoft, Amazon, Altice, Adobe, Comcast and Uber and also with human resources firms such as TriNet, ADP, BambooHR, HR Uncubed, and Crain's Best Places to Work.

In early 2021, Snappy Gifts was ranked in first place in Inc. magazine's list of Top 250 Fastest-Growing Private Companies in the New York Metro Area. In May of that year, Snappy Gifts raised another 70 million dollars in a series C funding round.

In August 2021, the company rented out 2,500 meters of office space in the Rubinstein Towers complex on Yitzhak Sadeh Street in Tel-Aviv.

In October 2022, Snappy announced the launch of its consumer platform.

In January 2023, the company announced that it was laying off around 100 of its employees, approximately 30% of its workforce due to "economic shifts and uncertainties" that are also experienced by many other tech companies.

In April 2024, the company announced that it had raised an additional $25 million in a Series D funding round led by Qumra Capital with a company valuation of around $200 million. It was also reported that the company saw 40% growth in 2023 with an annual revenue of $30 million.

In January 2025, Snappy acquired Covver, a corporate merchandise gifting platform. Co-founder and CEO of Snappy, Hani Goldstein, stated that "...the platforms would be unified, with Covver effectively becoming the “swag channel” on Snappy's platform." Goldstein also stated that Covver's swag expertise complement's Snappy's ability to deliver their products as gifts on their platform.

== The Snappy platform ==
The Snappy Gifts system, which is available for both mobile and desktop consumers, provides companies and individuals with software for personalized gifting based on employee data such as age, gender, location and can also be synced to allow for gift recommendations based on time-specific events such as birthday celebrations and work anniversaries. Gifts are sent via mobile text message or email. The recipient gets a "virtual scratch card" which reveals to them the gift which their employer has pre-chosen for them. The employee then has the option to accept it or swap it, while the employer later receives an email with the purchase request. Snappy Gifts are sourced through retailers and brands such as Amazon, Birchbox, Cloud9Living and Best Buy. The system is also designed with a "thank you" note feature, which allows managers to see the immediate impact on their employees.
