= Snap, Wiltshire =

Snap
- Extinct settlement
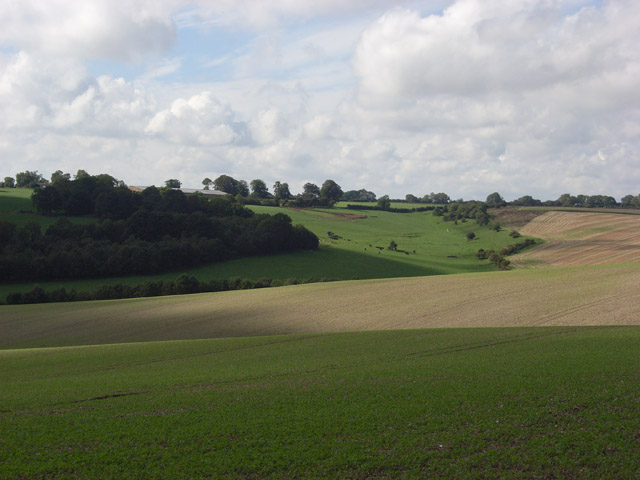
- Site of Snap village

- Snap within Wiltshire
- Coordinates: 51.4872°N 1.6808°W
- Country: England
- County: Wiltshire
- Parish: Aldbourne
- First recorded: 1268

Population (1914)
  - Total: 0
- Postal code: SN8

Snap is an abandoned village near Aldbourne in Wiltshire, England. It is unusual in that it was not abandoned until the 20th century.

The village was recorded in 1268 under the name of Snape. It was always a small place: in the 14th century there were 19 poll-tax payers, in 1773 there were between five and ten cottages, and at the 1851 Census the population was 41. In 1905, Henry Wilson, a butcher from Ramsbury, bought the two farms in the village and converted them from arable to sheep farming, which deprived the villagers of their work. By 1909 there were only two residents, and by 1914 the village was deserted.

Most of the buildings were destroyed when the site was used for military training in the First World War, and were later plundered for building materials; only earthworks are now visible. The name is remembered in Snap Farm.

The site lies near the Ridgeway National Trail.
