= Tecnam Snap =

Italian ultralight aircraft

Snap

General information
- Type: Ultralight aircraft and light-sport aircraft
- National origin: Italy
- Manufacturer: Tecnam
- Designer: Fabio Russo
- Status: In production (2015)
- Number built: at least one

History
- Introduction date: 2013
- Developed from: Dallair Aeronautica FR-100 Snap!

The Tecnam Snap is an Italian aerobatic ultralight aircraft, designed by Fabio Russo and produced by Tecnam of Casoria, Metropolitan City of Naples, introduced at the AERO Friedrichshafen show in 2013. The aircraft was intended to be supplied complete and ready-to-fly.

The design is derived from the Dallair Aeronautica FR-100 Snap!, which was originally built by Dallair, a Tecnam subcontractor, but Tecnam took over production in 2013.

== Design and development ==
The Snap was designed as a low-cost aerobatic aircraft wit a high power to weight ratio, to comply with the Fédération Aéronautique Internationale microlight rules. It features a cantilever low-wing, a single-seat under a bubble canopy, fixed conventional landing gear and a single engine in tractor configuration.

The aircraft is made with a welded 4130 steel tubing fuselage, with aluminum sheet for the wings, elevators and fin structures. The rudder, ailerons, engine cowling and fuselage covering are made from composite materials, while the lower fuselage tailcone is covered in doped aircraft fabric. Its 7.20 m (23.6 ft) span wing has an area of 8.30 m^{2} (89.3 sq ft). The tailplane is mounted low and the ailerons have spades fitted. Standard engines available are the Rotax 912ULS and the Rotax 912iS four-stroke powerplants, modified by EPA Power to put out 130 hp (97 kW) instead of their usual 100 hp (75 kW). It can be fitted with an inverted oil system allowing sustained inverted flight.

The design is not advertised for sale by Tecnam, but instead has been sold through its US distributor, SportairUSA. As of March 2017 SportairUSA is not advertising the design for sale.

As of March 2017, the design does not appear on the Federal Aviation Administration's list of approved special light-sport aircraft.

== Operational history ==
By March 2017 no examples had been registered in the United States with the Federal Aviation Administration.

== Specifications (Snap) ==
Data from Tacke

General characteristics

- Crew: one
- Wingspan: 2.19 m (7.20 ft)
- Wing area: 8.30 m^{2} (89.3 sq ft)
- Empty weight: 280 kg (617 lb)
- Gross weight: 420 kg (926 lb)
- Fuel capacity: 40 litres (8.8 imp gal; 11 US gal)
- Powerplant: 1 × Rotax 912ULS four cylinder, liquid and air-cooled, four stroke aircraft engine, 75 kW (101 hp)
- Propellers: 2-bladed constant speed propeller

Performance

- Maximum speed: 290 km/h (180 mph, 160 kn)
- Cruise speed: 260 km/h (160 mph, 140 kn)
- Stall speed: 83 km/h (52 mph, 45 kn)
- Wing loading: 50.6 kg/m^{2} (10.4 lb/sq ft)
