= Snapper Island (Queensland) =

Island in Queensland, Australia

Native name: Kaya Biji (Kuku-Yalanji)
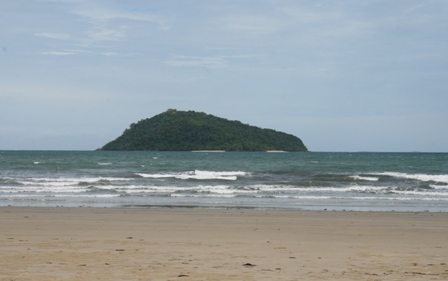
- Snapper Island
- Interactive map of Snapper Island

Geography
- Location: Far North Queensland
- Coordinates: 16.297°S 145.499°E
- Area: 0.66 km^{2} (0.25 sq mi)
- Highest elevation: 99 m (325 ft)

Administration
- Australia
- State: Queensland

Snapper Island (Kuku-Yalanji: Kaya Biji) is an island at the mouth of the Daintree River in Queensland, Australia, some 20 kilometres (12 miles) north of Port Douglas. It is administered by the Great Barrier Reef Marine Park Authority and the Queensland Parks and Wildlife Service as the Snapper Island National Park and Marine Park. Snapper Island is a popular tourism and sea kayaking destination. It is around 66 hectares or 0.66 square km in size.

== Indigenous culture ==
The island is part of the traditional sea country of the Kuku Yalanji Aboriginal people. The Kuku Yalanji people hunt and fish around the island and traditionally manage the island's culture.

== Other history ==
In the early 1900s, Jerry Doyle operated a lime kiln on the island, fired by wood from the Daintree, ferried over on a vessel called the "Nellie". Beche-de-mer (sea cucumbers) processing (boiling) may also have been undertaken here. There is evidence of remains of an early Chinese market garden on the island, the watercourse stonework of which is still visible today.

This island was a stopover by George Elphinstone Dalrymple before he discovered the Daintree River.

== Flora and Fauna ==
The island is home to a variety of vegetation communities such as a small mangrove community, closed sclerophyll forest, closed vine forest and some coastal vegetation. It is inhabited by many sea creatures and birds including the pied imperial-pigeons who come here during the summer season.
