= Edward Weller (cartographer) =

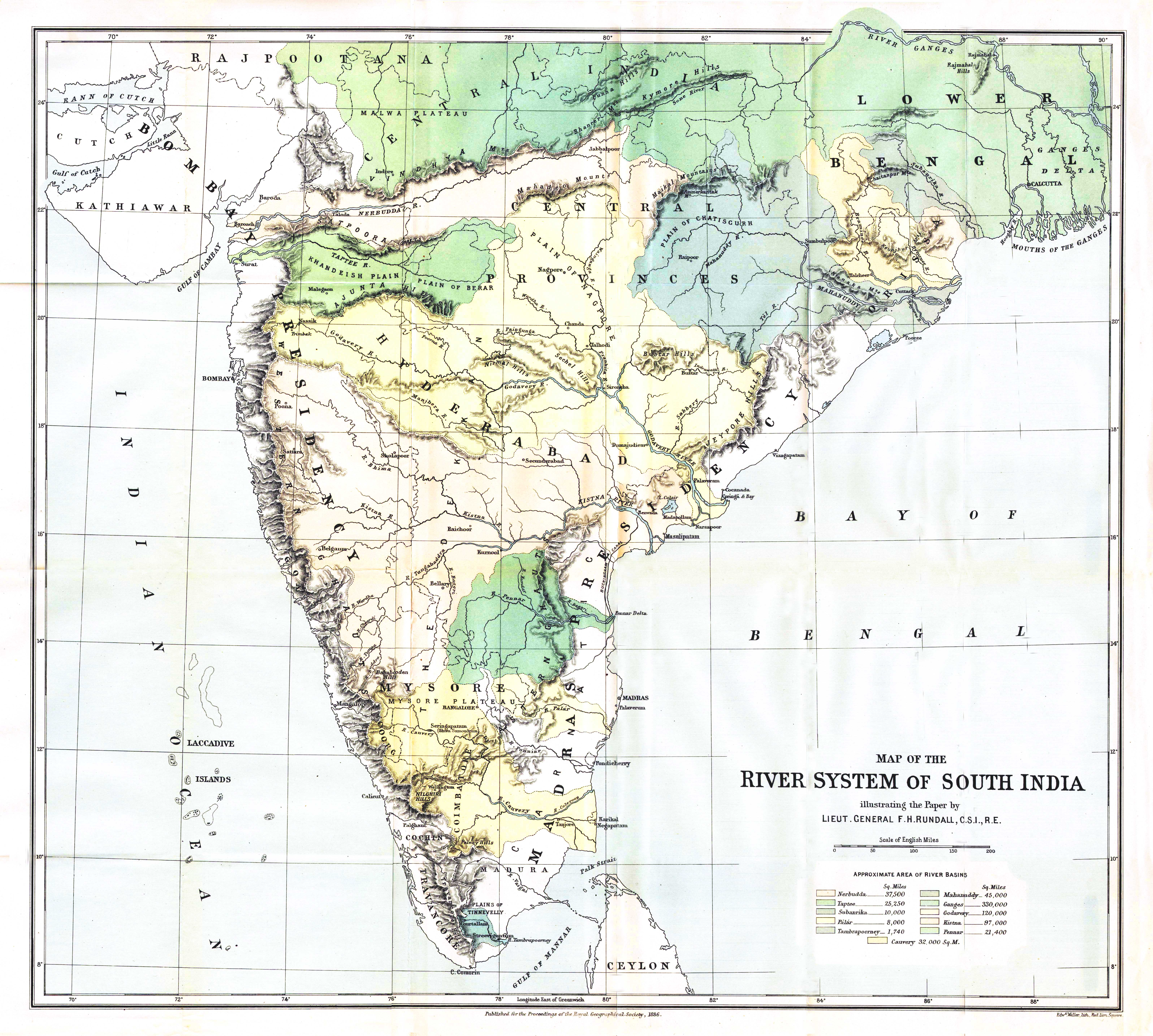
A map by Edward Weller: River System of South India (1886)

Edward Weller (1 July 1819 – May 1884) FRGS was a British engraver and cartographer who was one of the first to produce maps using lithography.

He was a "London-based engraver, cartographer and publisher, working from offices in Red Lion Square and later, Bloomsbury", who produced detailed steel plate engraved maps.
