= Snapper Island (New South Wales) =

Snapper Island Sydney, New South Wales
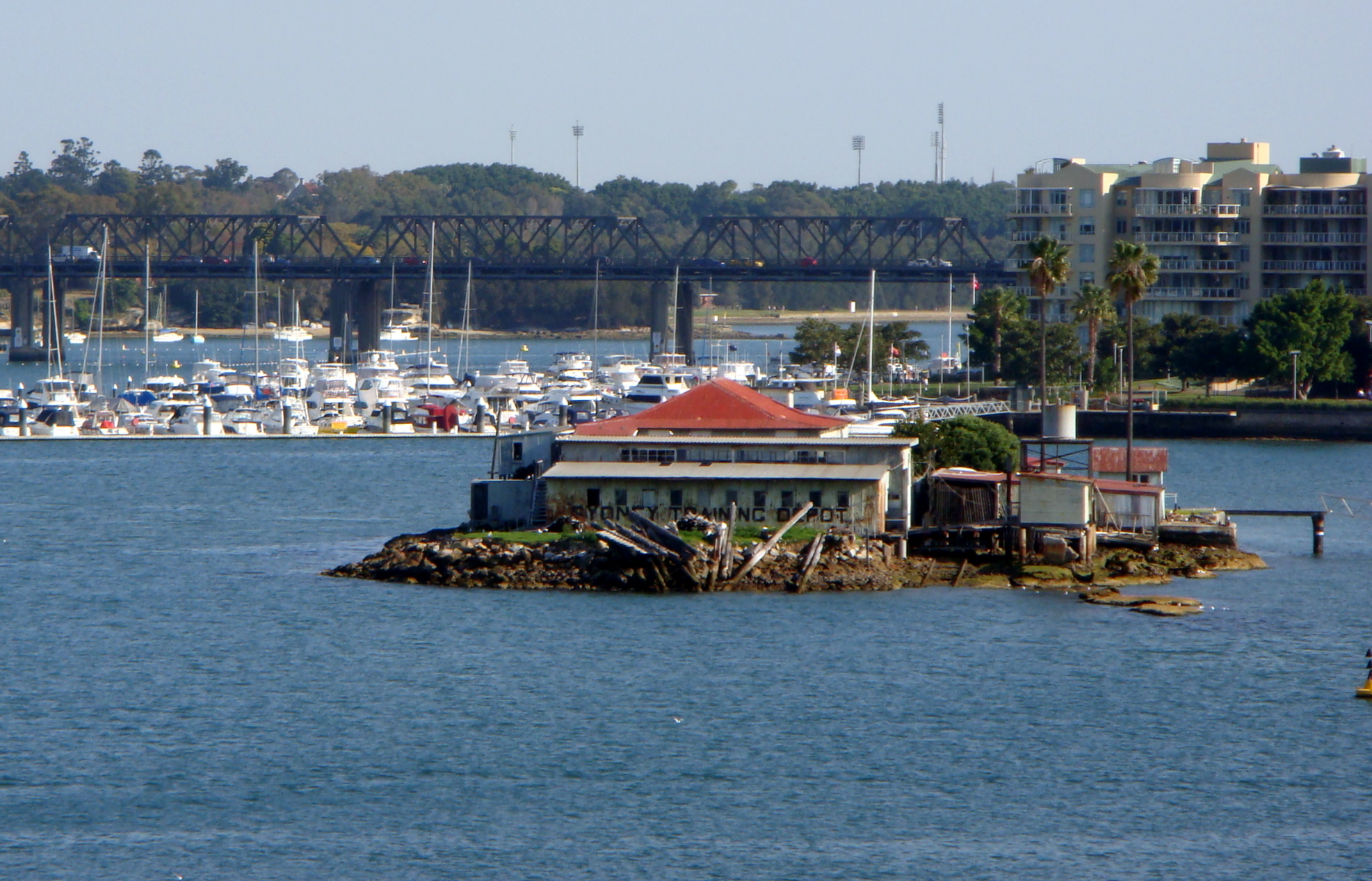

- Coordinates: 33°51′08″S 151°10′01″E
- Location: 0.3 km (0 mi) NE of Birkenhead Point, Drummoyne
Localities around Snapper Island:
	Sydney Harbour
Drummoyne	Snapper Island	Sydney Harbour
	Sydney Harbour

Snapper Island (previously known as Schnapper Island) is a 1.65-hectare (4.1-acre) island in Sydney Harbour, Australia. It lies in the main channel of the western section of the harbour, upstream of the Sydney Harbour Bridge, adjacent to the Sydney suburb of Drummoyne.

The island was originally a rocky outcrop, but in 1931-2 it was increased in size over seven times by land reclamation, and reshaped into the general plan form of a ship. Since then it has been used as a training depot by the Sea Cadets, and as a museum.

Snapper Island is the smallest island in the harbour and more than the others has been reshaped significantly by human intervention.

== Early history ==
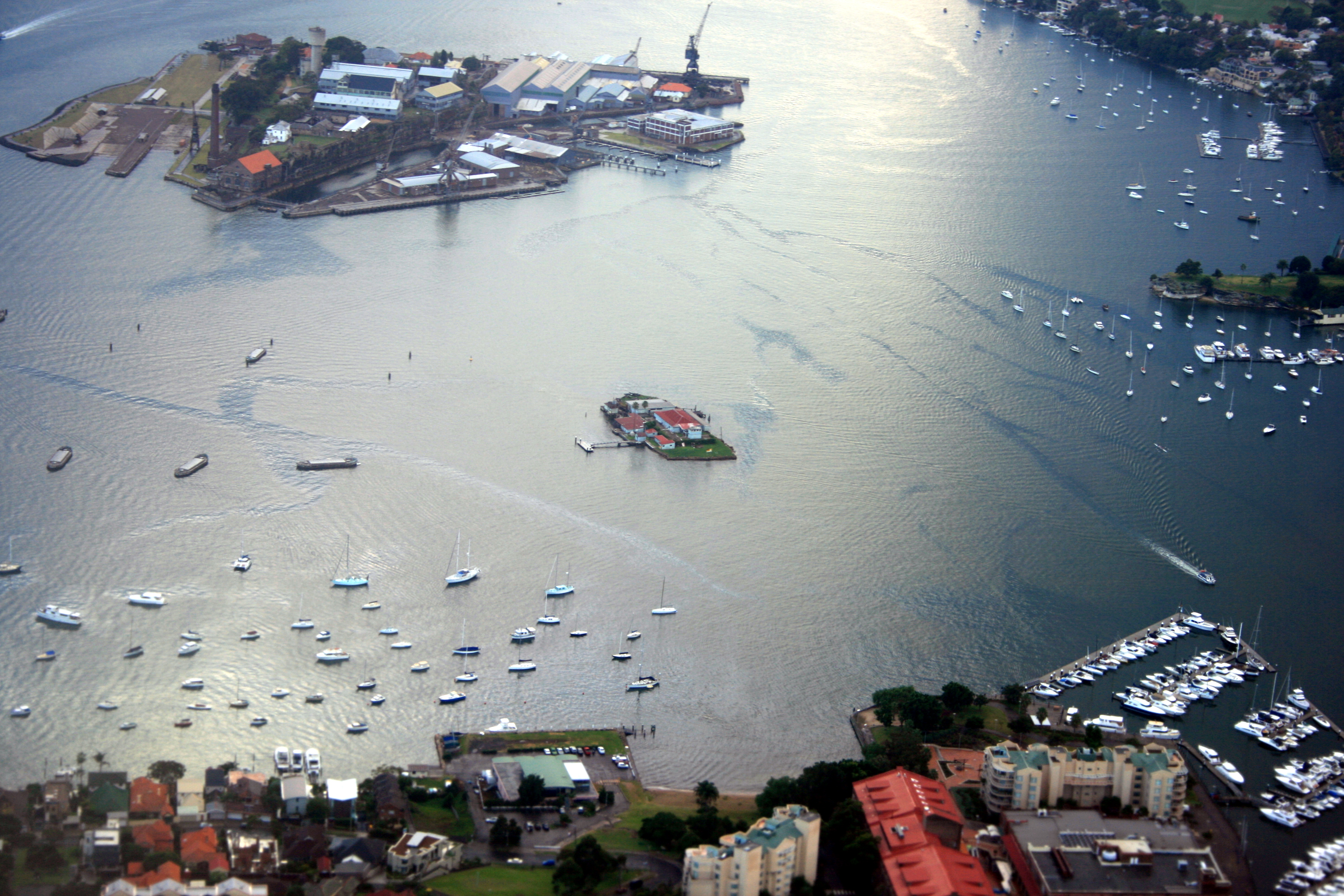
Snapper Island (centre) with Cockatoo Island (above), and the suburb of Drummoyne (below)

In 1879, Snapper Island was declared a public recreation reserve by the NSW Legislative Assembly. However, Snapper Island remained a rarely visited rocky outcrop.

When nearby Cockatoo Island was passed to the Royal Australian Navy in 1913, Snapper Island was included in its 'naval waters', and as such subject to naval control.

During World War I the island was leased to the Cockatoo Island Dockyard for storing ships' parts and old corrugated iron.

In 1930, Len Forsythe leased the island from the Commonwealth Government in order to create a training depot for boys in nautical skills. Around 50 cadets were recruited and began work on the island. After clearing the island of vegetation in 1931, the island was flattened by blasting an estimated 1,000 tonnes of rock from the top of the island over an eight-month period. Associated land reclamation activities increased the size of the island by around 1,000 square metres. The stone sea walls of the island were sculptured to create the shape of a ship with the stern (pointing towards Drummoyne) and the bow (pointing towards Cockatoo Island).

In 1932, building work commenced on a signal station, wharf and the other main buildings that can still be seen today. The layout of these buildings models the layout of a naval ship. The cadets also planted the two cabbage-tree palms which are still the only vegetation left on the island.

With the onset of World War II, the island was returned to the service of the Navy. At the end of 1942 United States troops moved onto the island to use it for training purposes. The British also used some of the facilities on Snapper Island as a social club for troops on leave.

In 1952, Forsythe decided to set up the Snapper Island Company and establish a museum on the island, the income from which would go towards the ongoing maintenance of the island. Opened after 1966, the museum held thousands of pieces of memorabilia from Australia's naval history.

Currently the island is closed to the public.
