= Robert William Pringle =

Scottish physicist

Prof Robert William Pringle OBE FRSE FRSC FIP FAPS (2 May 1920–20 June 1996) was a 20th-century Scottish physicist.

== Life ==
He was born in Edinburgh on 2 May 1920 the son of Llllias Dalgleish Hair and her husband, Robert Pringle. He was educated at George Heriot's School then studied physics at the University of Edinburgh, gaining the Vans Dunlop scholarship and graduated with a BSc in 1942. After graduation he assisted in University lectures. In 1945 he took up the post of lecturer under Professor Norman Feather.

In 1948 he left Edinburgh to go to Canada as assistant professor of physics at the University of Manitoba becoming a full professor in 1951, aged 31. He left there in 1955 to return to the UK where he took on the role as Chairman of Nuclear Enterprises (UK) Ltd. There he won the Queen's Award to Industry twice and won the Design Council Award for the diagnostic ultrasound scanner.

In 1964 he was elected a Fellow of the Royal Society of Edinburgh. His proposers were James Kyles, Norman Feather, Douglas Haig McIntosh, and George Richard Evans.

He died on 10 June 1996.

== Family ==
In 1948 he married Carol. They had one daughter and three sons. He was older brother to Derek Hair Pringle FRSE (1926–1995).

== Publications ==
- The Gamma Rays from Neutron-Activated Gold (1950)
- 20th Century Scottish Banknotes (1984) with James Douglas
