= Alexander Crichton Mitchell =

Scottish physicist

Alexander Crichton Mitchell FRSE
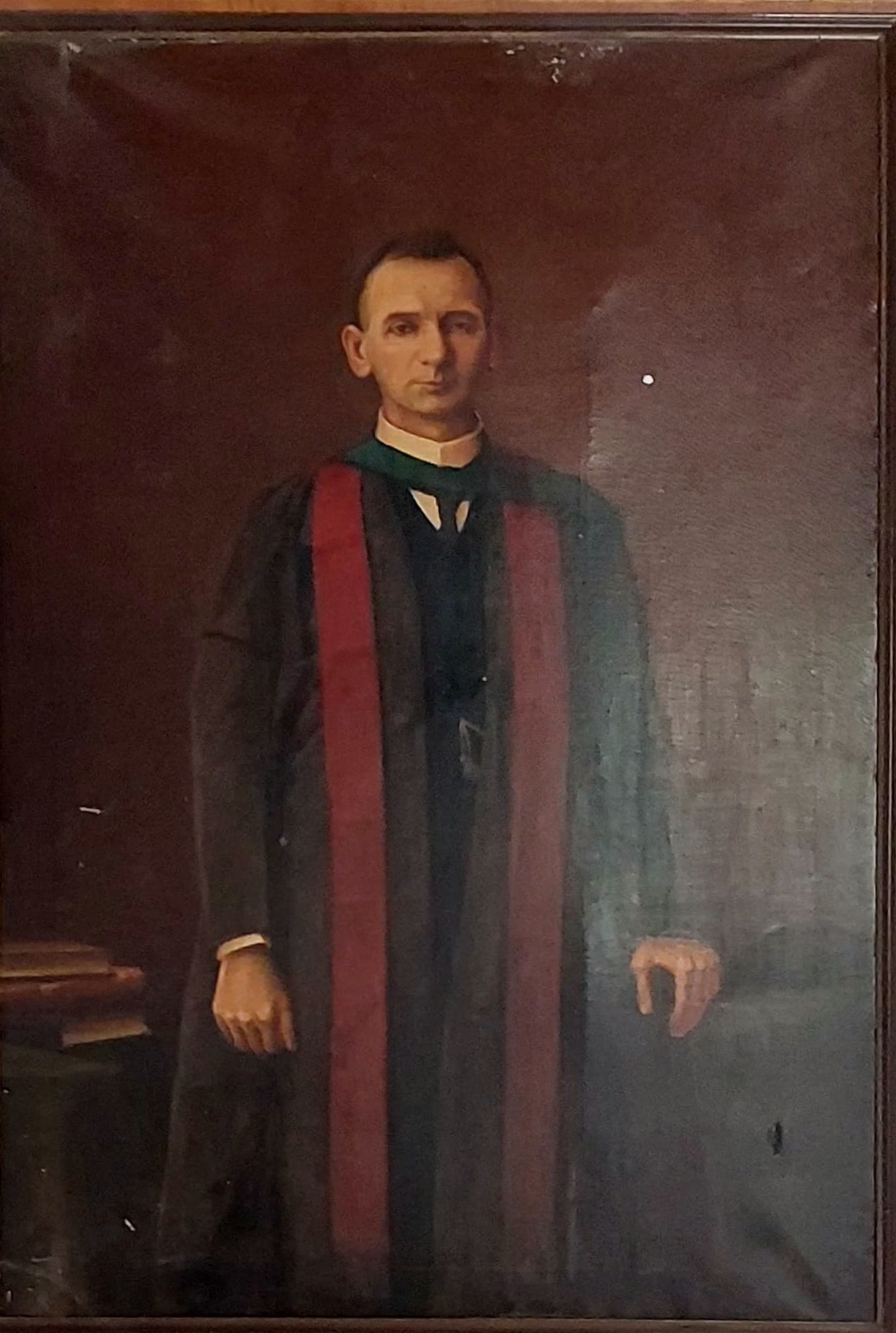
- Portrait at University College, Thiruvananthapuram
- Born: 1 July 1864; Edinburgh
- Died: 15 April 1952 (aged 87)
- Education: Edinburgh University
- Known for: Anti-submarine indicator loop
- Spouse: Agnes Farquharson Robertson
- Children: 3
- Awards: Keith Prize
- Scientific career
- Fields: Physics
- Workplaces: Royal Navy

Alexander Crichton Mitchell FRSE (1 July 1864 – 15 April 1952), named in some sources as Arthur Crichton Mitchell, was a Scottish physicist with a special interest in geomagnetics who worked for many years in India as a professor and head of a meteorological observatory before returning to Scotland. He then worked with the Royal Navy to devise a system, known as an anti-submarine indicator loop, for detecting submarines by detecting currents induced in a loop of wire on the sea floor.

== Early life ==
Mitchell was born in Leith on 1 July 1864 to James Mitchell and Isabella Mitchell née Crichton. He studied physics at Edinburgh University and graduated with a Bachelor of Science. He was elected Fellow of the Royal Society of Edinburgh in 1889. His proposers were Peter Guthrie Tait, Alexander Crum Brown, George Chrystal, and Sir Thomas Clark. He was elected a Fellow of the Scottish Meteorological Society in 1891.

== India ==
In 1890, he went to Trivandrum, in India, where he taught physics at the Maharaja's College. He also took up the position of director of the Trivandrum Observatory which had been established by John Caldecott and later headed by John Allan Broun before it fell into disuse. He married Agnes Farquharson Robertson (d. 1948) on 2 May 1892 and the couple had three children, all of whom were born in Trivandrum.

By 1893 he became a Principal of the college and also served as Director of Public instruction in the State of Travancore. The work involved inspecting schools across the region which he did on motorcycle. He once had an accident in Mavelikkara at a place later known as Mitchell Junction. Resigning from the college in 1912, he returned to Scotland and became an Honorary Research Fellow at Edinburgh University.

== Later work ==
During the First World War, German U-Boats were operational and a strategy was proposed to destroy the British Empire by blocking key ports such as the Firth of Forth. The Royal Society of Edinburgh set up a War Committee that discussed how science could be applied to defence. Mitchell visited the West Pier at Leith in June 1915 and on 1 August he tried a loop of wire at the end of Leith Pier and found that it could detect a passing trawler through the induced current. He later placed the loop horizontally on the harbour floor and found that it was too sensitive but could detect all passing ships. He solved the sensitivity problem by placing the loop in a figure of eight pattern.

In 1916, he became the superintendent of the Eskdalemuir Observatory. In 1922 he headed the Edinburgh office of the meteorological department which was created after the dissolution of the Scottish Meteorological Society. From 1916 to 1926 he was curator of the library for the Royal Society of Edinburgh and from 1926 to 1929 served as the Society's vice president under Sir Alfred Ewing as president. He received honorary doctorates from both the University of Edinburgh and Geneva.

In the 1920s he served on the committee for the Air Council.

He made important studies in terrestrial magnetism at Eskdalemuir Observatory in 1927. A major publication of Mitchell's was a review and history of the study of terrestrial magnetism published in three parts. His work on the diurnal incidence of disturbance in the geomagnetic field earned him the Keith Prize for 1931–33.

He died in Edinburgh on 15 April 1952.
