= Rhoda Bulter =

Rhoda Bulter (15 July 1929 – 1994), Shetland author, is one of the best-known Shetland poets of recent times.

== Biography ==
Born Rhoda Jernetta Ann Johnson, in Lerwick, she was the daughter of Jeremiah Johnson, seaman, from West Houlland in the parish of Walls, and Barbara Huano Thomason, from Da Horn, Lower Skelberry, Lunnasting. In January 1949 she married Dennis Bulter, 'Met man' from Lerwick Observatory.

== Poetry ==
Her first poem, 'Fladdabister', was published in The New Shetlander in 1970, following which she became a prolific writer in the Shetland dialect. For various reasons, her literary legacy is as yet uncollected. Four slim volumes of verse were published in her lifetime – Shaela, A Nev Foo a Coarn (subsequently combined as Doobled-Up), Linkstanes and Snyivveries

== Other work ==
Rhoda was a frequent contributor to the local Radio Shetland, reading her poems, and forming a double act known as "Tamar and Beenie" with local broadcaster and freelance journalist Mary Blance.

She also, over a number of years, wrote a regular monthly column for Shetland Life magazine, the fictional Beenie’s Diary.

== Bibliography ==
- Shaela 1976 – Thuleprint. ISBN 0-9504268-5-7
- A nev foo a coarn 1977 – Thuleprint. ISBN 0-906191-25-4
- Doobled-up 1978 – Thuleprint. ISBN 0-906191-25-4
- Link-Stanes 1980 – Shetland Times. ISBN 0-900662-28-X
- Snyivveries 1986 – Shetland Times. ISBN 0-900662-54-9

== CD – Bide a start wi' Me ==
This 22 track CD, a re-release of her 1976 LP was issued through BleatBeat Records on 9 December 2006 and featured recordings of Rhoda reading the following selection of her poetry:

- Bide a start wi' Me
- Fladdabister
- Gjaan for da airrents
- Mairch
- Neeborly Feelin
- Bül My Sheep
- Sea Pinks
- Wadder
- Rüts
- Da Exile
- Yule E'en
- Delight
- Da Bargain Book
- A Coorse Day
- Da Keepsake
- Da Tale O' Da Gluff
- Aald Daa
- Da Trooker
- Why
- Hame Again
- Da Boags' Spree
- It
