= Rob Varley =

Former CEO of the Met Office, UK

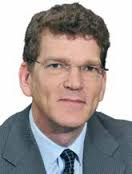
- Alma mater: University of East Anglia
- Employer: Met Office
- Position held: chief executive officer (2014–2018)

Rob Varley was appointed chief executive of the Met Office in 2014. He stepped down in 2018. Varley was First Vice President of the World Meteorological Organization until 24 April 2018.

He was educated at Cheltenham Bournside School and graduated from the University of East Anglia with a BSc in Environmental Sciences in 1983. Varley was the first CEO to be promoted from within the Met Office since its founding in 1854. He holds a postgraduate diploma in Management from the University of Reading (2001) and a diploma in Company Direction from the Institute of Directors (2010). He received an Honorary Doctorate of Science from the University of East Anglia in 2016. He is a Chartered Meteorologist of the Royal Meteorological Society and Chartered Director of the Institute of Directors. In 2012, he was named as the Institute of Directors' Director of the Year (Public and Third Sectors).

Varley was Vice President of the Royal Meteorological Society from 2013 to 2014, President of EUMETNET from 2015 to 2018 and First Vice President of the World Meteorological Organisation from 2017 to 2018.

Preceded by John Hirst	Chief Executive of the Met Office; 2014 - 2018	Succeeded by Penelope Endersby
