= Trivandrum Observatory =

Observatory in India

Coordinates: 8.508497°N 76.958318°E

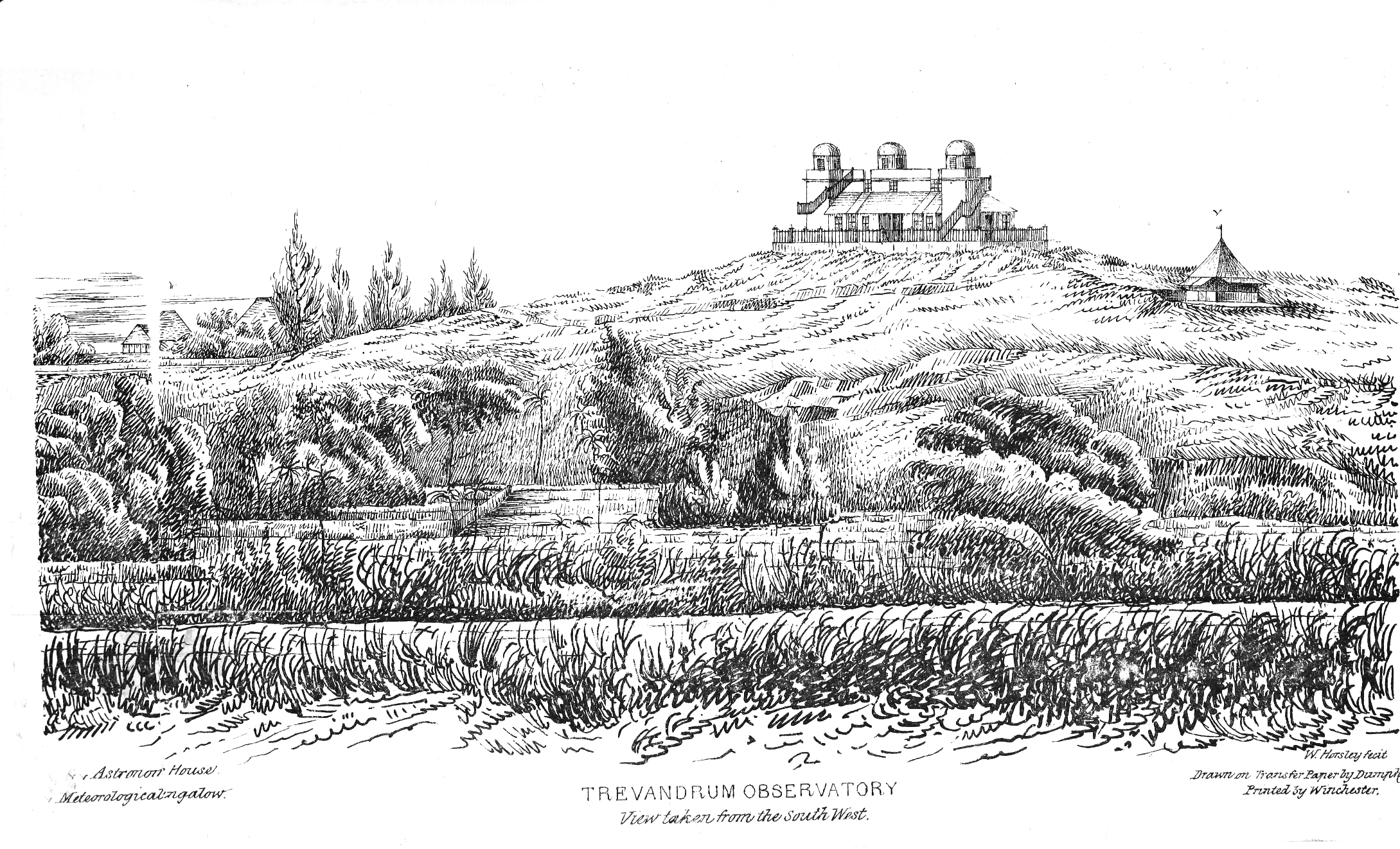
The observatory building in 1837

The Trivandrum Observatory or Thiruvananthapuram Astronomical Observatory is a scientific and astronomical observation station that was established by the Raja of Travancore Swathi Thirunal Rama Varma in 1836–37. Dr. Raja Rama Varma Rohani Thirunal was an established astronomer and member of the British and Canadian Astronomical Societies and a cousin of Raja Swathi Thirunal. He was also the Raja of Mavelikara Palace, a branch of the Travancore Royal family. The Raja wrote to the British Resident, Colonel James Stuart Fraser, an amateur scientist proposing the establishment of an astronomical observatory. This led to John Caldecott who earlier ran a small personal observatory at Alappuzha being appointed as the royal astronomer. The observatory was located on the highest point in the city and opposite the palace and was considered important as the magnetic equator at that time passed through Thiruvananthapuram. The observatory was designed by Lieutenant W. H. Horsley of the Madras Engineers. The British resident William Cullen initially considered the observatory as a bad use of money but the Raja and Caldecott were united in support of it.

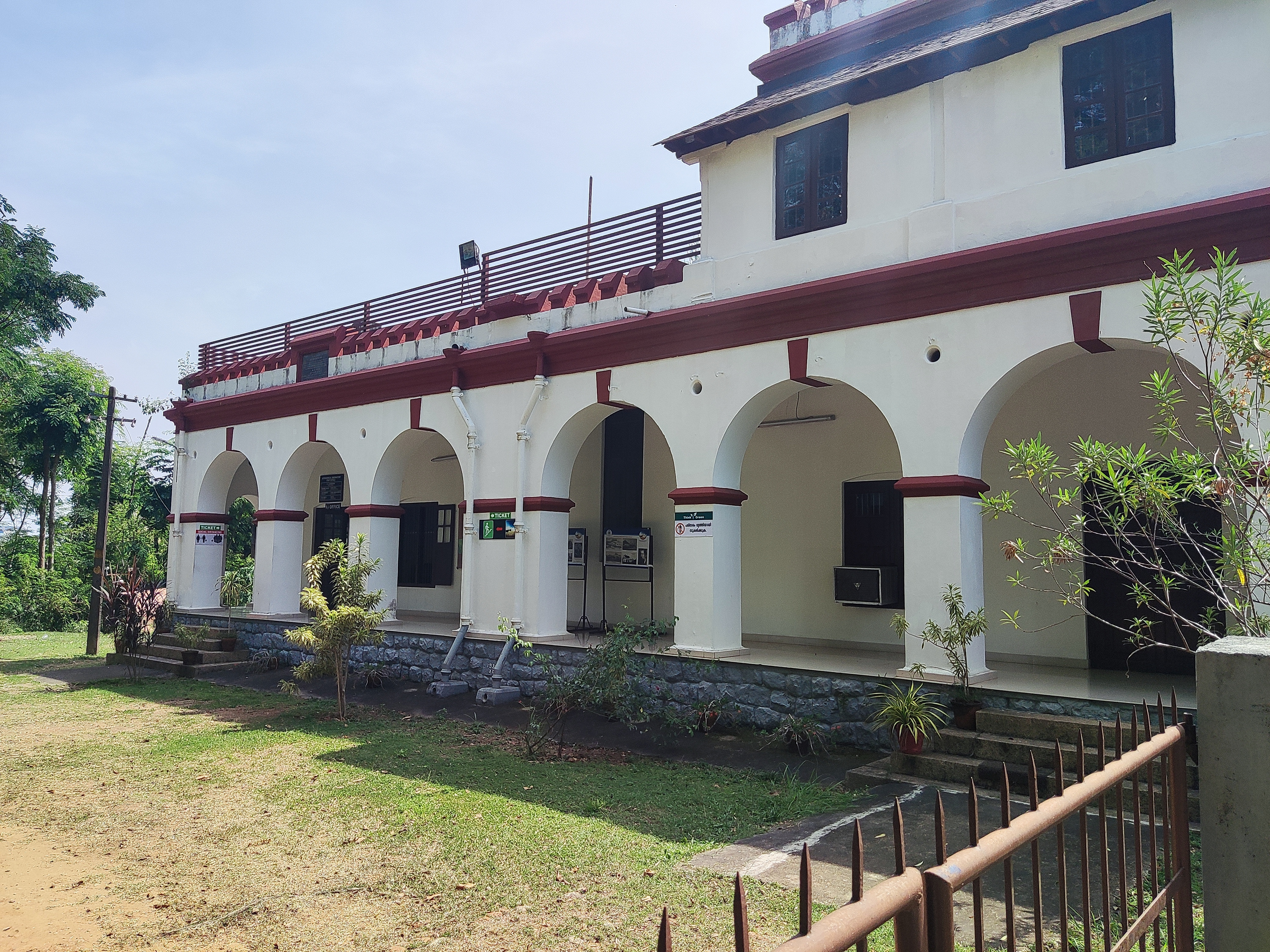
The new observatory

Caldecott also began taking meteorological measurements from July 1837 and expanded to another building in 1842 that housed a Dollond equatorial circle. A Travancore Almanac was published in 1838. Caldecott travelled to Europe in 1839 to obtain additional instruments and during this period the observatory was headed by Reverend Sperschneider. Caldecott died in 1849 and from January 1852 it was headed by John Allan Broun. Broun was also interested in altitudinal variation in the magnetic field and he had a second station established on the peak of Agasthyamalai ("Agastier Malley" or "Agustia Malley"). Broun and his assistants including J. Kochukunju (Cochoocoonjoo) and E. Kochiravi (Cocheravey) Pillai and several "computers" helped publish the Thiruvananthapuram Magnetic Observations in 1874.

The original observatory was demolished for constructing a water tank and a new observatory was built nearby. The new observatory has a telescope mounted above it and is open to visitors.

== See also ==
- List of astronomical observatories
- Madhava Observatory
