= Cheltenham Bournside School =

Secondary school in Gloucestershire, England

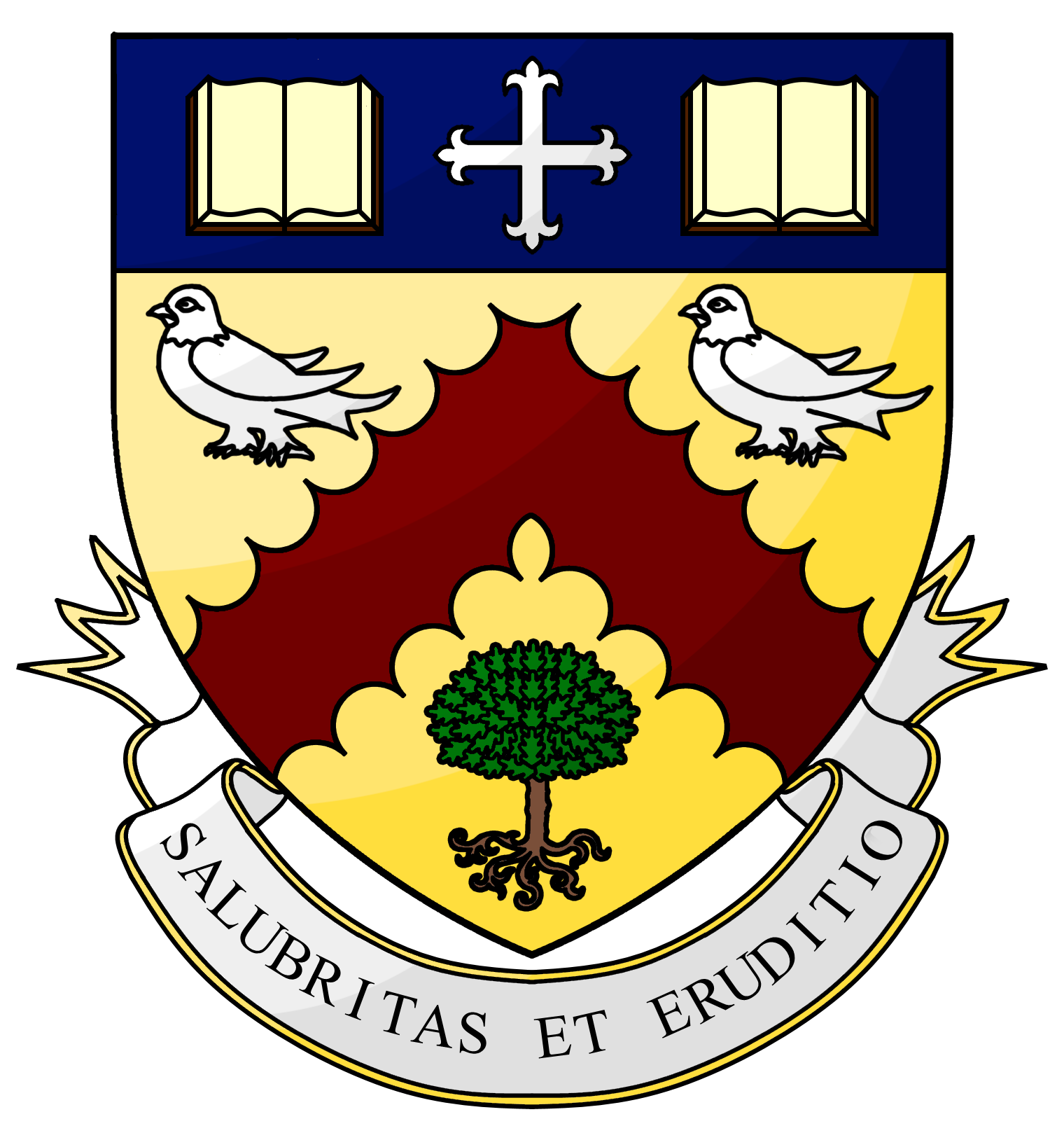
- The arms of Cheltenham Borough Council, as used by Bournside as their school badge

Location
- Warden Hill Road; Cheltenham, Gloucestershire, GL51 3EF; England; 51.8870°N 2.1005°W

Information
- Type: Academy
- Motto: "Usque Ad Finem’" (Latin) "Until the End"
- Established: 1972
- Department for Education URN: 136725 Tables
- Ofsted: Reports
- Chair of Governors: Stuart Hutton
- Headteacher: Steve Jefferies
- Teaching staff: 100
- Gender: Coeducational
- Age: 11 to 18
- Enrolment: 1828
- Houses: Attenborough; Frank; Hawking; Owens; Parks; Rowling
- Website: www.bournside.com

Cheltenham Bournside School, commonly referred to as Bournside School or simply Bournside, is a coeducational secondary school and sixth form with academy status, located in Cheltenham, Gloucestershire. The school initially opened as Gloucester Road Elementary School in 1919, going through several different reforms before becoming Cheltenham Bournside School in 1972.

It is situated in the south-west of Cheltenham, in the Warden Hill area. It is currently the largest school in Gloucestershire. Its current headteacher is Steve Jefferies, since 2020.

The school was last inspected on 27 September 2022, returning a result of 'Good'.

== History ==
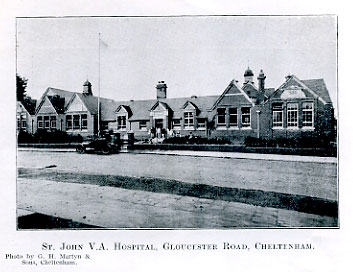
The Gloucester Road site during its use as a military hospital

Gloucester Road Elementary School opened in 1907, on a former farm and different site to the current school. It catered for 300 students of all ages, separated into different schools for boys, girls, and infants. From 1915 to 1919 it was used as St John's VA Hospital, with pupils being educated at local parish church schools on Milsom Street and Baker Street.

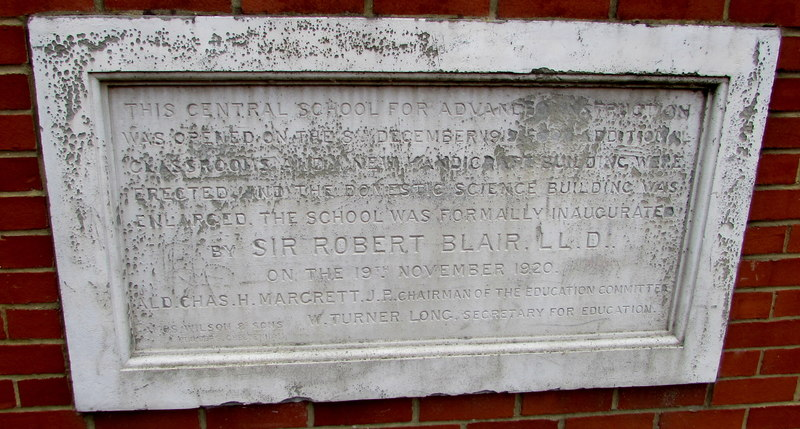
A plaque commemorating the Central School on Scholars Court, now a housing estate.

After its usage as a hospital ended, the school was expanded to include new handicraft, arts, and sciences blocks, and four new classrooms as well as a playing field. On re-opening in December 1919, it was renamed to the Cheltenham Central School for Advanced Instruction, accommodating 300 pupils aged 11–13. Soon after it was divided into the Central Boys School and the Central Girls School. In 1928 it purchased further land surrounding the school to use as sporting facilities.

In 1949, it was merged again into Cheltenham Technical High School, under reforms made by the Education Act 1944. It expanded to accommodate around 500 students around this time.

Work on the current site on Warden Hill Road began in 1967, with a second phase beginning in 1971. The new site opened in 1972 for 650 students, and the school was renamed to its current name. By 1975 it had 1,250 students, expanding further throughout the late 20th century to accommodate around 1,650 students by 2001.

The previous site on Gloucester Road was used by Gloucestershire College of Arts and Technology until demolition in 2003, after which it was replaced with a housing estate.

In 2011, Bournside School obtained academy status. It officially opened as an academy on 1 May 2011.

== Facilities ==
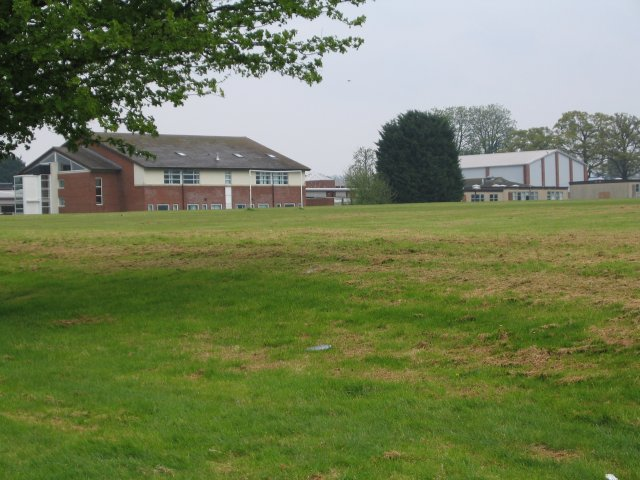
The school's playing fields and 'G' block.

The school occupies a large area in the Warden Hill ward of Cheltenham. It is based around a central quadrangle, with extensions built for humanities, sixth form, and science blocks. Separate from the main buildings are the sports facilities, the English and maths blocks, and a mixed-use block.

There are two large dining centres, with a capacity of 500 students. It began construction of a new maths block in 2017.

The sixth form has its own block, with a common room, study hall, and cafe.

=== Sports centre ===
The school operates a sports centre on-site, utilising its sports facilities. It is accessible to the public in the evenings.

=== Neighbouring schools ===
The school directly neighbours three schools: Belmont School and Bettridge School are both special needs establishments, whilst St James' is a primary school.

== School structure ==
=== Main school ===
Cheltenham Bournside students in Years 7–11 wear a uniform of a blue branded blazer, blue or black branded trousers, and a white shirt. Ties differ by house.

For sport, main school students are required to wear a branded white or navy polo shirt with navy shorts. Outside, students must wear branded navy sports socks, and boys must also wear the school's blue rugby jersey.

=== Sixth form ===
From the 2023 intake on, students must wear a specific uniform, including a branded sweater, branded trousers or a selection of skirts, and a sixth form house tie (compulsory for boys only). Previously students wore business attire.

=== Houses ===
The school has 6 Houses, named after famous people. They are currently Attenborough, Frank, Hawking, Owens, Parks and Rowling. Prior to this the 6 Houses were called Brontie, Curie, Fry, Holst, Pitt and Wren. Houses cover most pastoral affairs, with heads of house occupying a role similar to heads of year in other schools.

There are 10 tutor groups in each house, organised vertically: in the main school there are 3-8 students from each of the years 7-11 in every tutor group. Sixth form tutor groups are separate but also vertical.

Prefects and house captains are appointed from years 10 and 12 each year in Spring term. There is no head girl or head boy, with the roles instead being split between 12 senior house captains.

=== Governance ===
The school operates as a single-academy trust. It is led by a senior leadership team, accountable to a board of governors. The current headteacher is Steve Jefferies, who has been in the position since 2020. The current chair of governors is Susan Tovell.

== Academics ==
=== Enrolment ===
The school has 1,828 students as of 2024 with a capacity of 1,958. Of those, 286 are eligible for free school meals, or 19.2%. 11.9% of students do not speak English as a first language, below the national average of 18.1%.

It has 100 qualified teachers (full-time equivalent), meaning there is on average 1 teacher for every 18 students.

It does not have a specific catchment area, accepting students regardless of location.

=== Curriculum ===
The school follows the national curriculum up to GCSE level, with ability-based setting from year 8 onwards. Students choose their GCSE options in year 9 and begin studying them in year 10; BTec options are also available.

Class sizes are normal for a state secondary school, at around 30 students per class.

Sixth form students study 3 or 4 GCE A-Levels, 3 Level 3 vocational qualifications, or a mixture of both. Class sizes are normally smaller in sixth form, often around 10-20 per class. Students must achieve adequate grades to progress from year 12 to year 13.

The school runs a series of lectures from external speakers in partnership with the University of Gloucestershire. These run throughout the year for all students, covering a range of topics.

=== Performance ===
The school was last inspected by Ofsted on 27 September 2022, recording a result of 'Good' in all areas. It received primarily positive feedback, but was instructed to focus more on the key concepts of the curriculum and ensuring reading fluency for all students. Its last full inspection before this, in May 2012, also returned a result of 'Good'.

As of the 2022/2023 year, the school had a Progress 8 score of 0.52 for GCSE qualifications, falling into the 'well above average' banding. 55% of students achieved a grade 5 or above in English and maths, compared to a national average of 45%.

For the same year, the average result for sixth form students was C+ at A-level, slightly below the national average of B−. The average result for level 3 vocational qualifications was Dist-, slightly above the national average of Merit+. It recorded an average continuation rate of 91.95%.

=== Awards ===
The school was awarded the British Council International School Award in 2019 and 2022, for exceptional work in international education.

== Notable alumni ==
- Tom Thurlow, British entrepreneur
- Jaz Coleman, singer and composer
- Leon Taylor, Olympic diver, silver medallist at Athens 2004
- Rob Varley, Former Chief Executive of the Met Office
- Jack Clement, rugby player
