= Eskdalemuir Observatory =

Observatory in Dumfries and Galloway, Scotland

Coordinates: 55°18′44″N 3°12′22″W

The Eskdalemuir Observatory is a UK national environmental observatory located near Eskdalemuir, Dumfries and Galloway, Scotland. Along with Lerwick and Hartland, Eskdalemuir is one of three permanent geomagnetic observatories in the United Kingdom.

Built in 1904, its remote location was chosen to minimise electrical interference with geomagnetic instruments, which were relocated here from Kew Observatory in London in 1908 after the spread of electric tramcars led to excessive electromagnetic interference there.

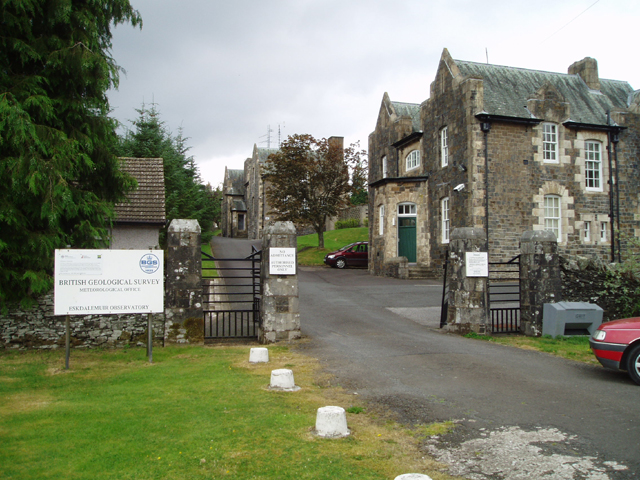
Eskdalemuir Observatory, the main buildings

== Purpose ==
The observatory is situated in the valley of the White Esk river at an altitude of 242 metres (794 ft), and so represents the climate of highland in northern Great Britain.

It currently monitors:

- Meteorological parameters
- Solar radiation
- Atmospheric pollution
- The UK Geomagnetic field
- Seismological activity

The observatory is managed by the British Geological Survey and the UK Met Office.

== Seismic measurements ==
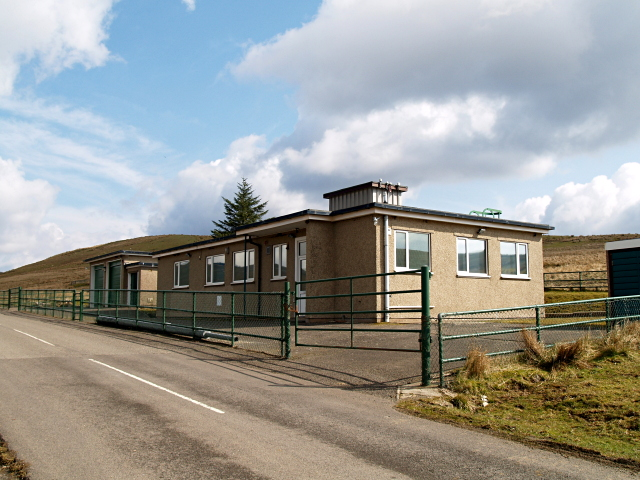
The seismic station to the north of the main observatory

The area has a low background of seismic activity, so is ideal for these measurements.

Shortly after 19:00 GMT on 21 December 1988, the observatory's seismometers recorded the ground impact of Pan Am Flight 103, which crashed into the nearby town of Lockerbie 14 miles (23 km) away after being destroyed by a bomb. The event registered 1.6 on the Richter magnitude scale.

There is a second seismic array approximately 2 miles (3.2 km) north of the main observatory established by the United Kingdom Atomic Energy Authority, which has been managed by Güralp Systems Ltd since 2002 on behalf of AWE Blacknest which provides the UK part of the international monitoring network of the Comprehensive Test Ban Treaty. This network allows covert nuclear tests to be detected via their seismic signatures. At Eskdalemuir it consists of an array covering 10 square kilometres (3 3/4 mi^{2}), consisting of two intersecting lines of 10 pits containing seismometers, a seismological vault and a recording laboratory.

== Historic atmospheric electricity measurements ==
Following the conventions of Kew Observatory, which preceded Eskdalemuir as a national geophysical laboratory, atmospheric electricity measurements formed a key part of the early operations. Atmospheric ion measurements were made by Lewis Fry Richardson. As Eskdalemuir is a relatively clean site distant from major towns and cities, the atmospheric electricity measurements have been analysed for global signals which are typically obscured at urban sites. The measuring technology followed that of Kew in employing a Kelvin water dropper electrometer for potential gradient measurements, changing to a radioactive polonium probe during the 1930s. The Eskdalemuir potential gradient was found to be correlated with measurements made simultaneously on the Carnegie research ship.

== Notable staff ==
- The meteorologist and mathematician Lewis Fry Richardson served as Superintendent at the Observatory between 1913 and 1918.
- Dr Arthur Crichton Mitchell superintendent of the observatory 1916 to 1922
- Dr Douglas Haig McIntosh worked here 1953 to 1955.
