= Lerwick Observatory =

British meteorological observatory

- Alternative names: Lerwick Observatory
- Organization: British Geological Survey
- Location: Lerwick, Shetland Islands, United Kingdom
- Coordinates: 60°08′17″N 1°10′56″W

Lerwick Observatory (also known as Lerwick Magnetic Observatory) is a British meteorological observatory located near the port of Lerwick, Shetland Islands, United Kingdom. Along with Eskdalemuir and Hartland, Lerwick is one of three permanent geomagnetic observatories in the United Kingdom and is operated by the Met Office.

== History ==
The Norwegian government requested that the British establish a meteorological observatory in the Shetland Islands, after Roald Amundsen expressed a desire to compare notes on the Aurora Borealis he observed during his expedition in 1920. The observatory was opened by Arthur Crichton Mitchell on the of 7 June 1921.

== Atmospheric observations ==
Established in 1921, Lerwick Observatory quickly became a hub for measuring atmospheric electricity and studying meteorological and auroral phenomena. For nearly six decades, researchers recorded the hourly potential gradient (PG) measurements, providing valuable data on atmospheric electrical changes. These measurements were made in a clean environment, making them even more valuable. Recent digitisation of the historic data by citizen scientists has allowed for further analysis.

One discovery made at the Lerwick Observatory is that there is a connection between the PG data and Pacific Ocean temperature anomalies. This finding has sparked international interest and offers insights into the complex relationship between atmospheric electricity and climate dynamics.

PG data from Lerwick has also demonstrated the effects of nuclear weapon detonations on the atmospheric electric environment.

The Lerwick Observatory has also contributed to our understanding of the cosmic rays and cloud properties. Researchers found that cloud base height distributions for low clouds vary with cosmic ray conditions. The global atmospheric electrical circuit can be influenced by cosmic rays, which have the potential to affect cloud properties, revealing the complex interaction between cosmic phenomena and our atmosphere.

Furthermore, the observatory's measurements have shed light on the relationship between the global electric circuit and electrified cloud parameters. They found that during El Niño periods, there was an increase in electric fields compared to La Niña or neutral phases in sea surface temperature.

The Lerwick Observatory's research has also improved our understanding of the geomagnetic activity. By comparing their data to another observatory, scientists discovered instrument-related inhomogeneities that affected the long-term trend of geomagnetic activity and the evolution of interplanetary magnetic field strength and solar wind speed.

Overall, scientists at the Lerwick Observatory have gained insights into atmospheric electricity, cosmic rays, cloud properties, geomagnetic activity, and space weather forecasting. Their findings contribute to the understanding of these phenomena and their connections to the environment.
