= Met Office =

United Kingdom's national weather service

Coordinates: 50°43′38″N 3°28′30″W

- Logo of the Met Office since 2000

Executive agency overview
- Formed: 1 August 1854; 172 years ago
- Jurisdiction: United Kingdom
- Headquarters: Bracknell, Berkshire (before December 2003) Met Office Operations Centre, Exeter, Devon (since December 2003)
- Motto: Per scientiam tempestates praedicere
- Employees: 2,473 (March 2025)
- Minister responsible: Liz Kendall MP, Secretary of State for Science, Innovation and Technology
- Deputy Minister responsible: Patrick Vallance, Minister of State for Science, Research and Innovation
- Executive agency executives: Penny Endersby, Chief Executive; Stephen Belcher, Chief of Science and Technology
- Parent department: Department for Science, Innovation and Technology
- Website: www.metoffice.gov.uk

The Met Office, previously known as the Meteorological Office until November 2000, is the United Kingdom's national weather and climate service. It is an executive agency and trading fund of the Department for Science, Innovation and Technology and is led by CEO Penny Endersby, who took on the role as Chief Executive in December 2018 and is the first woman to do so. The Met Office makes meteorological predictions across all timescales from weather forecasts to climate change.

Although an executive agency of the UK Government, the Met Office supports the Scottish Government, Welsh Government and Northern Ireland Executive in their functions and preparations ahead of intense weather and planning for extreme weather alerts. Met Office policies can be used by each government to inform their planning and decision-making processes. The Met Office has an office located in the Scottish capital, Edinburgh, and a forecasting centre in Aberdeen in the north-east of Scotland, which are some of the services used to help the Scottish Government with objectives such as climate change.

== History ==
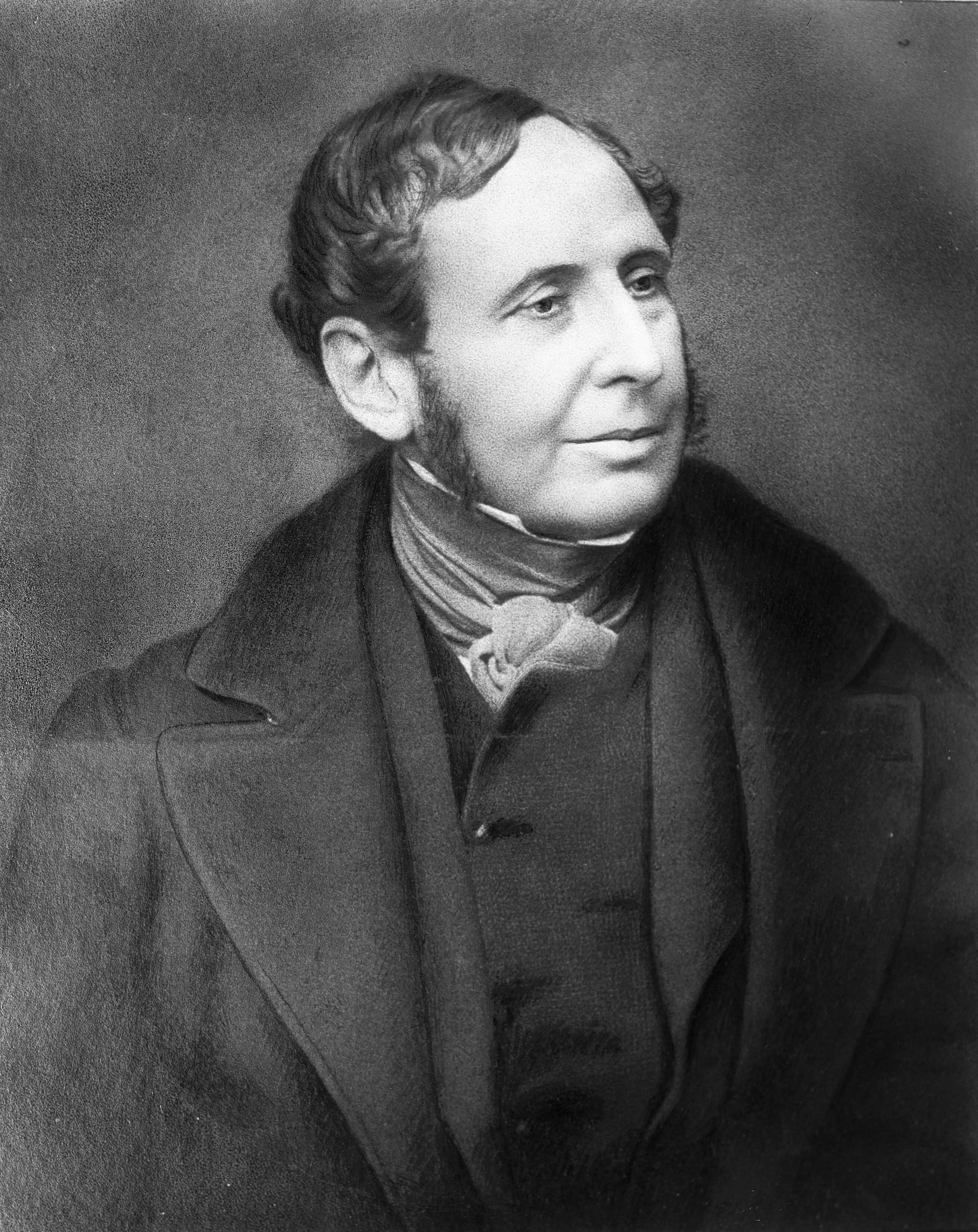
Vice Admiral Robert FitzRoy, founder of the Met Office

The Met Office was established on 1 August 1854 as a small department within the Board of Trade under Vice Admiral Robert FitzRoy as a service to mariners. The loss of the passenger vessel, the Royal Charter, and 459 lives off the coast of Anglesey in a violent storm in October 1859 led to the first gale warning service. FitzRoy established a network of 15 coastal stations from which visual gale warnings could be provided for ships at sea.

The new electric telegraph enabled rapid dissemination of warnings and also led to the development of an observational network which could then be used to provide synoptic analysis. The Met Office started in 1861 to provide weather forecasts to newspapers. FitzRoy requested the daily traces of the photo-barograph at Kew Observatory (invented by Francis Ronalds) to assist in this task and similar barographs and as well as instruments to continuously record other meteorological parameters were later provided to stations across the observing network. Publication of forecasts ceased in May 1866 after FitzRoy's death but recommenced in April 1879.

=== Connection with the Ministry of Defence ===
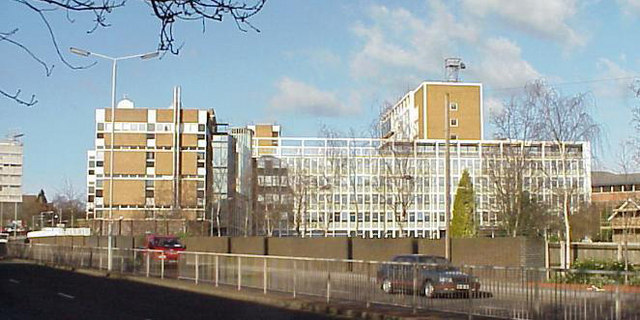
Former Met Office building in Bracknell, Berkshire, before relocation to Exeter, since demolished

Following the First World War, the Met Office became part of the Air Ministry in 1919, the weather observed from the top of Adastral House (where the Air Ministry was based) giving rise to the phrase "The weather on the Air Ministry roof". As a result of the need for weather information for aviation, the Met Office located many of its observation and data collection points on RAF airfields, and this accounts for the large number of military airfields mentioned in weather reports even today. In 1936 the Met Office split with services to the Royal Navy being provided by its own forecasting services.

It became an executive agency of the Ministry of Defence in April 1990, a quasi-governmental role, being required to act commercially.

=== Changes of ministry ===
Following a machinery of government change, the Met Office became part of the Department for Business, Innovation and Skills on 18 July 2011, and subsequently part of the Department for Business, Energy and Industrial Strategy following the merger of BIS and the Department of Energy and Climate Change on 14 July 2016.

Although no longer part of the MOD, the Met Office maintains strong links with the military through its front line offices at RAF and Army bases both in the UK and overseas and its involvement in the Joint Operations Meteorology and Oceanography Centre (JOMOC) with the Royal Navy. The Mobile Met Unit (MMU) are a unit consisting of Met Office staff who are also RAF reservists who accompany forward units in times of conflict advising the armed forces of the conditions for battle, particularly the RAF.

== Locations ==
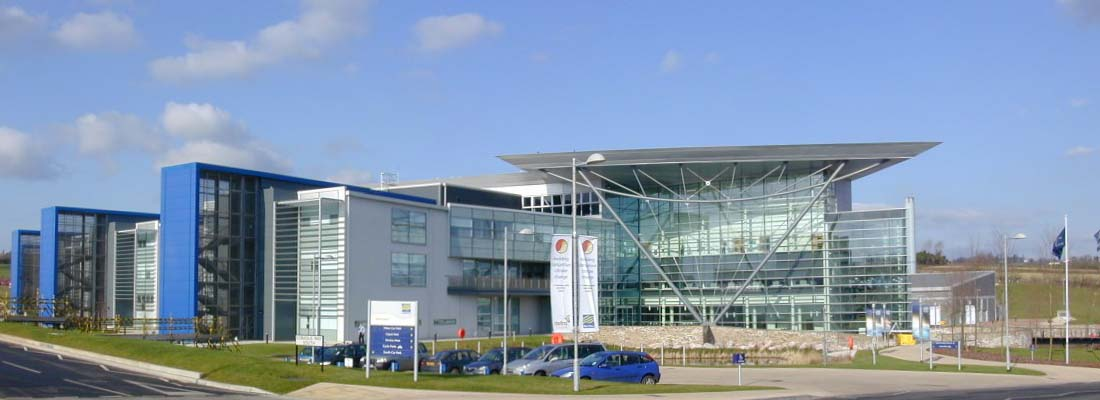
The 2003 headquarters building on the edge of Exeter

In September 2003 the Met Office moved its headquarters from Bracknell in Berkshire to a purpose-built £80m structure at Exeter Business Park, near junction 29 of the M5 motorway. The new building was officially opened on 21 June 2004 – a few weeks short of the Met Office's 150th anniversary – by Robert May, Baron May of Oxford.

It has a worldwide presence – including a forecasting centre in Aberdeen, and offices in Gibraltar and on the Falklands. Other outposts lodge in establishments such as the MetOffice@Reading (formerly the Joint Centre for Mesoscale Meteorology) at University of Reading in Berkshire, the Joint Centre for Hydro-Meteorological Research (JCHMR) site at Wallingford in Oxfordshire, and there is a Met Office presence at Army and Air Force bases within the UK and abroad (including frontline units in conflict zones). Royal Navy weather forecasts are often provided by naval officers, not Met Office personnel.

== Forecasts ==
=== Weather forecasting and warnings ===
The Met Office issues Severe Weather Warnings for the United Kingdom through the National Severe Weather Warning Service (NSWWS). These warn of weather events that may affect transport infrastructure and endanger people's lives. In March 2008, the system was improved and a new stage of warning was introduced, the 'Advisory'.

The Met Office along with Irish counterpart Met Éireann introduced a storm naming system in September 2015 to provide a single authoritative naming system for the storms that affect the UK and Ireland. The first named storm under this system, Abigail was announced on 10 November 2015. In 2019, the Met Office and Met Éireann were joined by Dutch national weather forecasting service the Royal Netherlands Meteorological Institute (KNMI).

=== Weather prediction models ===
The Unified Model, or UM, is the principal modelling suite used by the Met Office. Released in 1990, it is named as such for its ability to be run over a range of scales in space and time. The UM forms the basis of all operational Numerical Weather Prediction at the Met Office, for both deterministic and ensemble forecasts.

Deterministic forecasts include the UKV model which runs at 1.5 km (0.93-mile) resolution over the UK and 4 km (2.5-mile) in surrounding areas out to a maximum of 120 hours. In addition is global deterministic forecast at 1.0 km (0.62-mile) resolution out to six days, which then provides the boundary conditions for the UKV model.

Ensemble forecasts are also run for both the UK and globally. The UK ensemble (MOGREPS-UK) has 18 members and operates at a 2.2 km (1.4-mile) resolution out to five days, while the global ensemble (MOGREPS-G) runs at 20 km (12-mile) out to seven days. The global model also has 18 members, which then provide interpolated physics perturbations and necessary boundary conditions for the corresponding members of the UK ensemble.

=== Flood Forecasting Centre ===
Formed in 2009, the Flood Forecasting Centre (FFC) is a joint venture between the Environment Agency and the Met Office to provide flood risk guidance for England and Wales. The Centre is jointly staffed from both parent organisations and is based in the Operations Centre at the Met Office headquarters in Exeter.

==== Scottish Flood Forecasting Service ====
In Scotland this role is performed by the Scottish Flood Forecasting Service, a joint venture between the Scottish Environment Protection Agency (SEPA) and the Met Office.

=== Seasonal forecasts ===
The Met Office makes seasonal and long range forecasts and distributes them to customers and users globally. The Met Office was the first climate and weather forecast provider to be recognised as a Global Producing Centre of long range forecasts by the World Meteorological Organisation and continues to provide forecasts to the WMO for dissemination to other national meteorological services worldwide.

Met Office research has broken new ground in seasonal forecasting for the extratropics and has demonstrated its abilities in its seasonal predictions of the North Atlantic Oscillation and winter climate for Europe and North America.

=== Supply of forecasts for broadcasting companies ===
One of the main media companies, ITV produce forecasts for ITV Weather using the Met Office's data and animated weather symbols.

The BBC used to use Met Office forecasts for all of its output, but on 23 August 2015, it was announced that the BBC would be replacing the Met Office with MeteoGroup, a competing provider, as part of the corporation's legal obligation to provide best value for money for the licence fee payers. The BBC still uses some Met Office data for certain forecasts, particularly severe weather warnings and the Shipping Forecast. In July 2025, the BBC announced that it would be partnering with the Met Office again in future.

=== World Area Forecast Centre ===
The Met Office is one of only two World Area Forecast Centres or WAFCs, and is referred to as WAFC London. The other WAFC is located in Kansas City, Missouri, and known as WAFC Washington. WAFC data is used daily to safely and economically route aircraft, particularly on long-haul journeys. The data provides details of wind speed and direction, air temperature, cloud type and tops, and other features.

=== Volcanic Ash Advisory Centre ===
As part of its aviation forecast operation the Met Office operates the London Volcanic Ash Advisory Centre (VAAC). This provides forecasts to the aviation industry of volcanic ash clouds that could enter aircraft flight paths and impact aviation safety. The London VAAC, one of nine worldwide, is responsible for the area covering the British Isles, the north east Atlantic and Iceland. The VAAC were set up by the International Civil Aviation Organization (ICAO), an agency of the United Nations, as part of the International Airways Volcano Watch (IAVW). The London VAAC makes use of satellite images, plus seismic, radar and visual observation data from Iceland, the location of all of the active volcanoes in its area of responsibility. The NAME dispersion model developed by the Met Office is used to forecast the movement of the ash clouds 6, 12 and 18 hours from the time of the alert at different flight levels.

=== Air quality ===
The Met Office issues air quality forecasts made using NAME, the Met Office's medium-to-long-range atmospheric dispersion model. It was developed as a nuclear accident model following the Chernobyl accident in 1986, but has since evolved into an all-purpose dispersion model capable of predicting the transport, transformation and deposition of a wide class of airborne materials. NAME is used operationally by the Met Office as an emergency response model as well as for routine air quality forecasting. Aerosol dispersion is calculated using the United Kingdom Chemistry and Aerosols model.

The forecast is produced for pollutants and their typical health effects are shown in the following table.

Pollutant	Health Effects at High Level
Nitrogen dioxide Ozone; Sulphur dioxide	These gases irritate the airways of the lungs, increasing the symptoms of those suffering from lung diseases.
Particulates	Fine particles can be carried deep into the lungs where they can cause inflammation and a worsening of heart and lung diseases

Decadal Predictions

The Met Office coordinates the production and collation of decadal climate prediction from climate centres around the world as part of its responsibilities as World Meteorological Organisation Lead Centre for Annual to Decadal Climate Prediction. These predictions are updated each year and a summary, the Global Annual to Decadal Climate Update is published each year.

=== IPCC ===
Until 2001 the Met Office hosted the Intergovernmental Panel on Climate Change working group, chaired by John Houghton, on climate science. In 2001 the working group moved to the National Oceanic and Atmospheric Administration.

=== High performance computing ===
Due to the large amount of computation needed for Numerical Weather Prediction and the Unified model, the Met Office has had some of the most powerful supercomputers in the world. In November 1997 the Met Office supercomputer was ranked third in the world.

Year	Computer	Calculations per second	Horizontal resolution (global/local)	Number of vertical levels
1959	Ferranti Mercury	3 kiloflops	(N.A./320 km)	2 levels
1965	English Electric KDF9	50 kiloflops	(N.A./300 km)	3 levels
1972	IBM System/360 195	4 megaflops	(300 km/100 km)	10 levels
1982	CDC Cyber 205	200 megaflops	(150 km/75 km)	15 levels
1991	Cray Y-MP C90/16	10 gigaflops	(90 km/17 km)	19 levels
1997	Cray T3E 900/1200	430 gigaflops	(60 km/12 km)	38 levels
2004	NEC SX-6	2.0 teraflops	(40 km/12 km)	50 levels
2006	NEC SX-8 and SX-6	5.4 teraflops	(40 km/4 km)	50 levels
2009	IBM Power6	140 teraflops	(17 km/1.5 km)	70 levels
2015	Cray XC40	16 petaflops	(10 km/1.5 km)	70 levels
2025	Microsoft Azure	60 petaflops	(10 km/1.5 km)	70 levels

=== Customer service ===
Since 2012 the Met Office Contact Centre (known as the Weather Desk) has been part of Contact Centre Panel's 'Top 50 Companies for Customer Service' programme.

In 2015 the Met Office won awards in the following categories:

- Rated 1st Overall for Combined Channels
- Most Improved Overall for Social Media
- Rated 2nd Overall for Call Service
- Rated 1st Overall for Email Service
- Best in Public Sector
- Best Extra Small Centre

== Weather stations ==
Reports (observations) from weather stations can be automatic (totally machine produced), semi-automatic (part-machine and part manual), or manual. Some stations produce manual observations during business hours and revert to automatic observations outside these times. Many stations feature "present weather" sensors, CCTV, etc. There is also a network of 'upper air' stations, using radiosondes. The six main radiosonde stations in the UK are Camborne, Lerwick, Albemarle, Watnall, Castor Bay and Herstmonceux.

Some stations have limited reporting times, while other report continuously, mainly RAF and Army Air Corps stations where a staffed met office is provided for military operations. The "standard" is a once-hourly reporting schedule, but automatic stations can often be "polled" as required, whilst stations at airfields report twice-hourly, with additional (often frequent in times of bad weather) special reports as necessary to inform airfield authorities of changes to the weather that may affect aviation operations.

Some stations report only CLIMAT data (e.g. maximum and minimum temperatures, rainfall totals over a period, etc.) and these are usually recorded at 0900 and 2100 hours daily. Weather reports are often performed by observers not specifically employed by the Met Office, such as Air traffic control staff, coastguards, university staff and so on.

- Eskdalemuir Observatory
- Lerwick Observatory
- Penkridge weather station
- Prestatyn weather station
- Stonyhurst
- Sutton Bonington
- Wye weather station
- RAF Benson
- RAF Brize Norton weather station
- RAF Coningsby
- RAF Cottesmore
- RAF Cranwell weather station
- RAF Kinloss weather station
- RAF Leeming weather station
- RAF Leuchars weather station
- RAF Linton-on-Ouse weather station
- RAF Little Rissington weather station (supported by RAF Brize Norton)
- RAF Lossiemouth weather station
- RAF Lyneham weather station
- RAF Marham weather station
- RAF Northolt weather station 51.55 N 0.417 W
- RAF Odiham weather station
- RAF Shawbury
- RAF Waddington weather station
- Wattisham Flying Station weather station
- RAF Valley
- Middle Wallop Flying Station weather station

== Meteorological Research Unit and the Facility for Airborne Atmospheric Measurements (FAAM) ==
Meteorological Research was carried out at RAE Bedford with instruments being carried by barrage balloons until the RAE facility closed in the 1980s.

The Met Office association with Cardington continued by maintaining a Meteorological Research Unit (MRU) until 2025. This was responsible for conducting research into part of the atmosphere called the boundary layer by using a tethered balloon which was kept in a small portable hangar.

=== FAAM ===
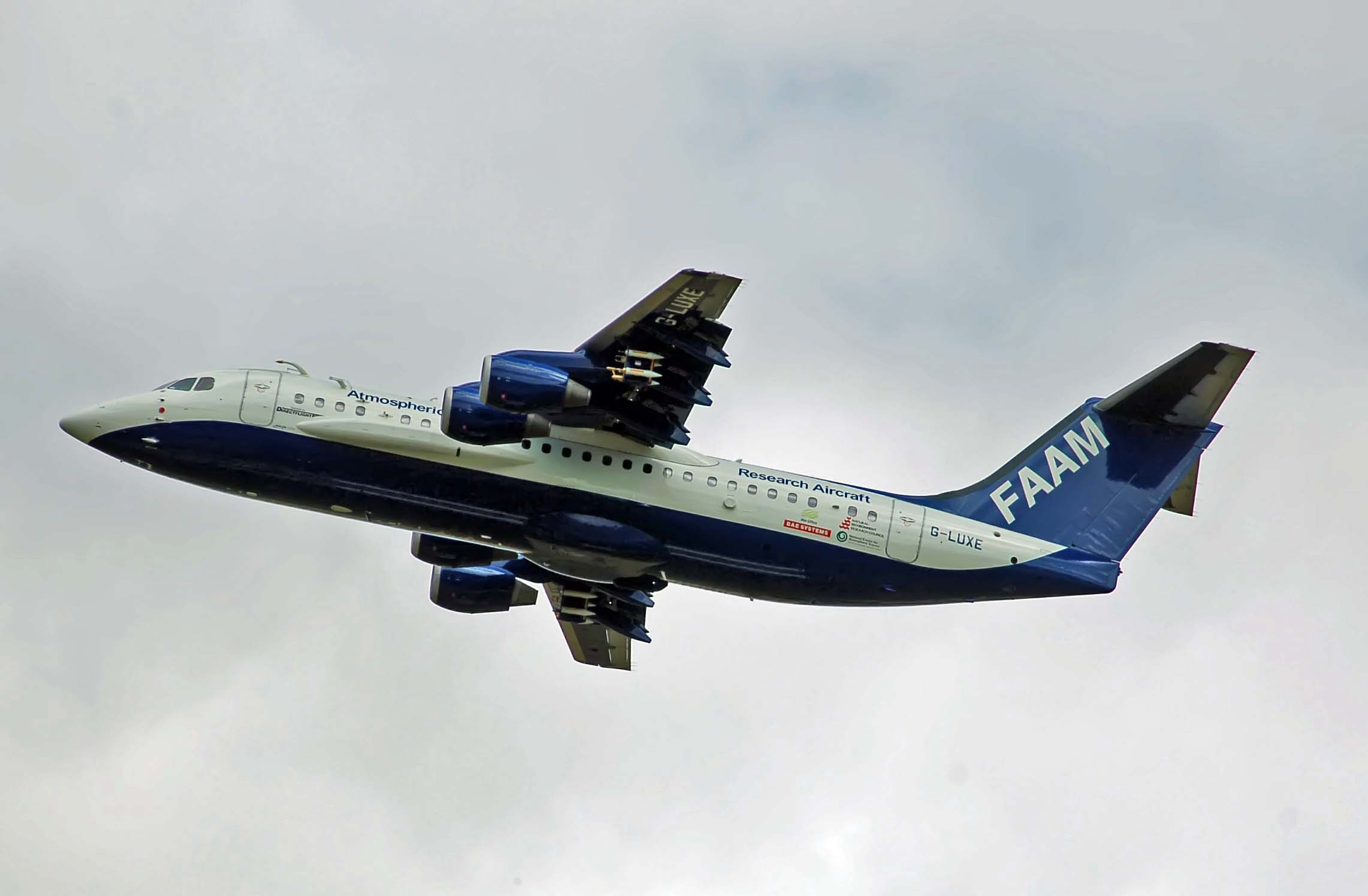
FAAM BAe146-300 takes off at RIAT, RAF Fairford, England

The Facility for Airborne Atmospheric Measurements (FAAM), part of the National Centre for Atmospheric Science, is based at Cranfield Airport. It is a collaboration with the Natural Environment Research Council.

The FAAM was established as part of the National Centre for Atmospheric Science (NCAS), itself part of NERC, to provide aircraft measurement for use by UK atmospheric research organisations on worldwide campaigns. The main equipment is a modified BAe 146 type 301 aircraft, registration G-LUXE, owned and operated by BAE Systems on behalf of Directflight Limited.

Areas of application include:

- Radiative transfer studies in clear and cloudy air;
- Tropospheric chemistry measurements;
- Cloud physics and dynamic studies;
- Dynamics of mesoscale weather systems;
- Boundary layer and turbulence studies;
- Remote sensing: verification of ground-based instruments;
- Satellite ground truth: radiometric measurements and winds;
- Satellite instrument test-bed;
- Campaigns in the UK and abroad.

== Directors general and chief executives ==
- Sir William Napier Shaw 1905–1920
- Sir Graham Sutton 1954–1965
- Sir Basil John Mason 1965–1983
- Sir John Houghton 1983–1991
- Julian Hunt 1992–1997
- Peter Ewins 1997–2004
- David Rogers 2004–2005
- Mark Hutchinson 2005–2007
- John Hirst 2007–2014
- Rob Varley 2014–2018
- Penelope Endersby 2018–

== Arms ==
Coat of arms of Met Office
Notes Mantled Purpure and Bleu Celeste doubled Argent Adopted 1990 Crest Within a Coronet the rim Or the finials composed of alternate sails and Mullets of four greater and as many lesser points Argent a Sea Eagle (Haliaetus albicilla) wings close holding in the dexter claw a Pole headed by a Weather Cock having below its points North South East West all Gold Escutcheon Per fesse Bleu Celeste and Vert goutty deau a Fess nebuly Argent and in dexter chief a Mullet of four greater and as many lesser points Argent Motto Per Scientiam Tempestates Praedicere

== See also ==
- Climatic Research Unit email controversy
- Climate of the United Kingdom
- Climate change in the United Kingdom
- Burns' Day storm
- Eskdalemuir Observatory
- European Centre for Medium-Range Weather Forecasts
- Great Storm of 1987
- Met Éireann, the Irish meteorological service, which separated from the UK Met Office in 1936.
- North West Shelf Operational Oceanographic System
- Weather system naming in Europe
