= Penny Endersby =

British researcher and academic

Penny Endersby CBE FREng HonFInstP
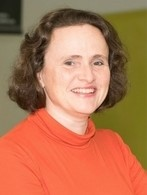

Chief Executive of the Met Office
- Incumbent
- Assumed office December 2018
- Preceded by: Rob Varley

Personal details
- Born: Penelope Clare Endersby; February 1970 (age 56)
- Children: 2
- Education: Haberdashers' Aske's School for Girls; University of Cambridge

Penelope Clare Endersby CBE FREng HonFInstP (born 1970) is a British scientist and senior civil servant originally specialising in armour and explosives. She was appointed chief executive of the Met Office in December 2018. Prior to that, she led cyber and information systems at the Defence Science and Technology Laboratory (DSTL).

== Education and early career ==
Endersby grew up in north London with an engineer father, who worked for British Gas, and a mother who was a full-time homemaker following a degree in classics at Oxford. She was privately educated at Haberdashers' Aske's School for Girls, Elstree. She studied Natural Sciences at the University of Cambridge, and was an undergraduate student at Newnham College, Cambridge. She remains an associate of Newnham. Here she became interested in materials science and metallurgy. She was sponsored by British Gas, researching fuel cells.

== Research and career ==
After graduating, she joined the Royal Armament and Research Development Establishment in 1993.

Endersby started her career as a researcher specialising in armour and explosives. She served at the Royal Armament and Research Development Establishment, becoming the "UK expert on electric and intelligent armours".

She was appointed as the department manager at the Defence Science and Technology Laboratory at Porton Down in 2009. She began to focus on C4ISR and cyber security. She served on the board of Ploughshare Innovations, the Ministry of Defence (United Kingdom) technology transfer office.

She holds visiting professorships at University of Southampton in computer science and at Exeter University in Physics and the Environment. Endersby was made division head of Cyber and Information Systems Division at the Defence Science and Technology Laboratory in 2015. She was involved in their International Women's Day celebrations.

One of the first engineers chartered to the Institute of Physics (IoP), Endersby joined the council of the IoP in 2017.

Endersby was appointed chief executive at the Met Office in December 2018, the first woman to fill that role.

In 2021 she was elected a Fellow of the Royal Academy of Engineering (FREng) and awarded the British Computer Society medal for her outstanding contribution to green technology.

Endersby was appointed Commander of the Order of the British Empire (CBE) in the 2024 New Year Honours for services to meteorology, defence science and technology.

Endersby is the UK’s permanent representative to the World Meteorological Organisation and a member of their Executive Council. As UK delegate to the European Centre for Medium-Range Weather Forecast she was elected president (the first female in the role) in 2023.

== Personal life ==
Endersby is an expert choir singer. A member of the St Peter’s Singers, she has also recorded with The Farrant Singers, Chamber Choir, Salisbury.

A lay canon, Endersby is the first Canon Scientist at Exeter Cathedral. She has two children. She is interested in wildlife and records UK phenology. She is a trustee of the Wiltshire Wildlife Trust. She is chair of the Dartmoor Steering Group

Preceded by Rob Varley	Chief Executive of the Met Office; December 2018 - present	Incumbent
