= John Allan Broun =

Scottish scientist

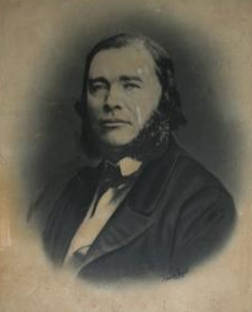
- Born: 21 September 1817; Dumfries, Scotland
- Died: 22 November 1879 (aged 62)
- Known for: meteorologist
- Awards: FRS; Royal Medal (1878); Keith Medal (1859-61)

John Allan Broun FRS (21 September 1817 – 22 November 1879) was a Scottish scientist with interests in magnetism, particularly of the earth, and meteorology. Broun studied in Edinburgh University and worked at the observatory in Makerstoun from 1842 to 1849 before moving to India to work in the Kingdom of Travancore. He continued his studies on geo-magnetism in India and was involved in setting up observatories there apart from managing the Napier Museum in Trivandrum. One of the fundamental discoveries he made was that the Earth loses or gains magnetic intensity not locally, but as a whole. He also found that solar activity causes magnetic disturbances.

== Early years ==
Broun was born in Dumfries where his father ran a school training students intending to join the navy. Broun was educated at Edinburgh University where he was influenced by James D. Forbes. In 1842, there was an interest in magnetic observations and Thomas McDougall Brisbane established an observatory at his home in Makerstoun, in Scotland and when a director was sought, Forbes recommended Broun who worked there from 1842 to 1849. The observations Broun made at Makerstoun were published in the Transactions of the Royal Society of Edinburgh. Broun suffered heart palpitations, possibly due to extended overnight study. He then hired John Welsh as an assistant. In 1850 he moved to Paris, also marrying Isaline Vallouy, daughter of a priest from Canton du Vaud. Colonel William Henry Sykes recommended Broun for work in India in 1851.

== Work in India ==
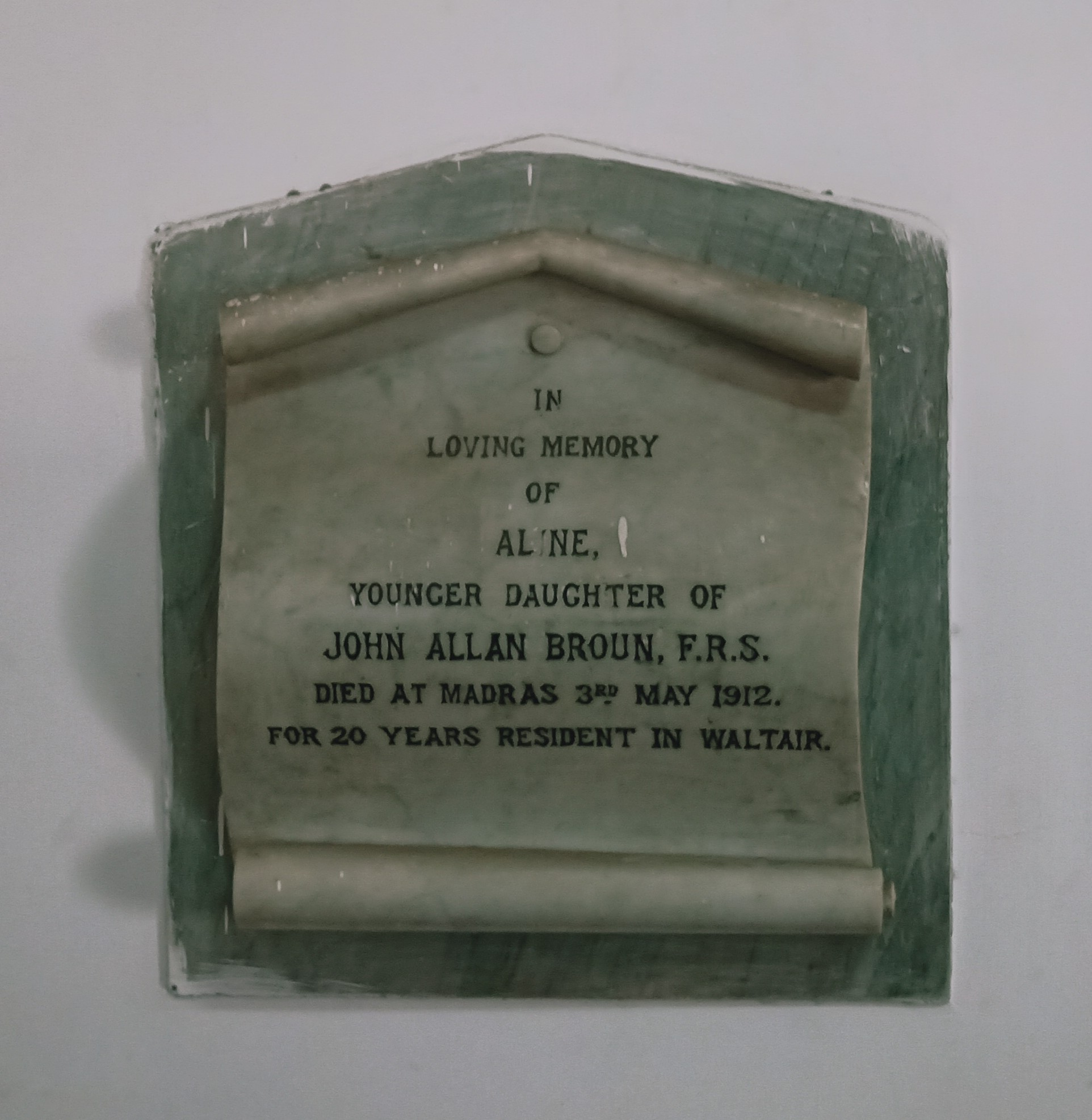
Memorial tablet for Broun's daughter Aline

From 1852, Broun was director of Trivandrum Observatory, in Trivandrum, in Travancore, India. Trivandrum is today known as Thiruvananthapuram, and is the capital of the Indian State of Kerala, but then it was the capital of the princely state of Travancore, a territory in a subsidiary alliance with British India. The observatory had been founded in 1836 by Swathi Thirunal Rama Varma, the Maharajah of Tranvacore. The first director of the observatory was John Caldecott (1800-1849). The observatory is now part of the University of Kerala, and is one of the oldest of its kind in India. The rulers of Tranvacore during the time of Broun were Uthradom Thirunal (until 1860) and his successor Ayilyam Thirunal. Broun was sent to study geomagnetism at a period when the British Academy was interested in studying it on a global scale. Trivandrum was close to where the magnetic equator lay at the time of Broun.

Broun observed large scale pressure changes across India between Shimla and Madras and cyclic variation in magnetic declination. Broun's assistants in Kerala included J. Kochukunju (Cochoocoonjoo) and E. Kochiravi (Cocheravey) Pillai. Broun, while still in India, was elected a Fellow of the Royal Society of London in 1853. He also built an observatory on Agastya Mala, the highest peak in Travancore, and helped to found the museum and zoological gardens. He had a bifilar magnetometer setup on Agastyamalai between 1855 and 1858. This museum was later demolished and replaced by what is now called Napier Museum. The original zoological gardens still survive as Trivandrum Zoo. Trivandrum. Broun suffered from deafness and sickness in India forcing a return to Europe in 1860 and then returned to India to work for three years.

== Later career ==
Broun left India for good around 1865, living in Lausanne, Switzerland, and then Stuttgart, Germany, before arriving in London, England, in 1873. He then, with a grant from the Royal Society, worked on analysing magnetic observations made at colonial stations. He also published reports on the Makerstoun and Trivandrum observatories. He was awarded the Keith Medal of the Royal Society of Edinburgh and the Royal Medal of the Royal Society in 1878 for over 35 years of work on magnetism and meteorology.

== Sources ==
- Entry for John Allan Broun in Dictionary of National Biography (1903)
- A. M. Clerke, Anita McConnell, Broun, John Allan (1817–1879), rev. Anita McConnell, Oxford Dictionary of National Biography, Oxford University Press, 2004
- Entry for Broun in the Royal Society's Library and Archive catalogue's details of Fellows (accessed 22 April 2008)
- History of the University, including the University Observatory, from the University of Kerala
