= Douglas Haig McIntosh =

Douglas Haig McIntosh FRSE FRMS OBE (1917–1993) was a 20th-century Scottish meteorologist. He was affectionately known as “Mac”.

== Life ==
McIntoch was born in Leven, Fife on 9 September 1917, and, in what was perhaps a patriotic fever during the First World War, named after Douglas Haig, Lord Haig, the commanding officer of the British Army.

He studied Science at the University of St Andrews graduating with an MA BSc in 1938, and then joining the staff of the Meteorology Department at the University of Edinburgh.

Interrupted by the Second World War he became a meteorological forecaster for RAF Coastal Command in Scotland before being posted to Calcutta in India as Senior Meteorological Officer. In 1944 he became Deputy Chief Meteorological Officer for Southeast Asia, with the notional rank of Squadron Leader. After the war he was based in Germany from 1947 to 1950.

He returned to the Edinburgh Meteorological Office in 1950. In 1953 he joined the Eskdalemuir Observatory for two years, returning to Edinburgh in 1955 as Head of the Meteorological Department of the University of Edinburgh.

In 1955 he was elected a Fellow of the Royal Society of Edinburgh. His proposers were C. T. R. Wilson, James Paton, Mervyn A. Ellison, and Sir Ernest Wedderburn. The University of Edinburgh awarded him an honorary doctorate (DSc) in 1960.

He retired in 1982 and died in Edinburgh on 3 March 1993. His body was cremated.

== Publications ==
- Essentials of Meteorology (1972)

== Family ==
In 1941 he married Constance Murray.
