= John Caldecott =

English businessman, astronomer and meteorologist

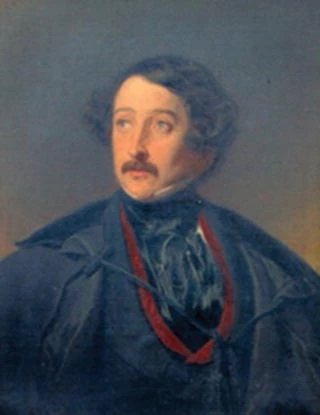

John Caldecott (16 September 1801 – 16 December 1849, Trivandrum) was an East India Company commercial agent, meteorologist and astronomer who worked in the court of the Raja of Travancore at the Trivandrum Observatory.

== Biography ==
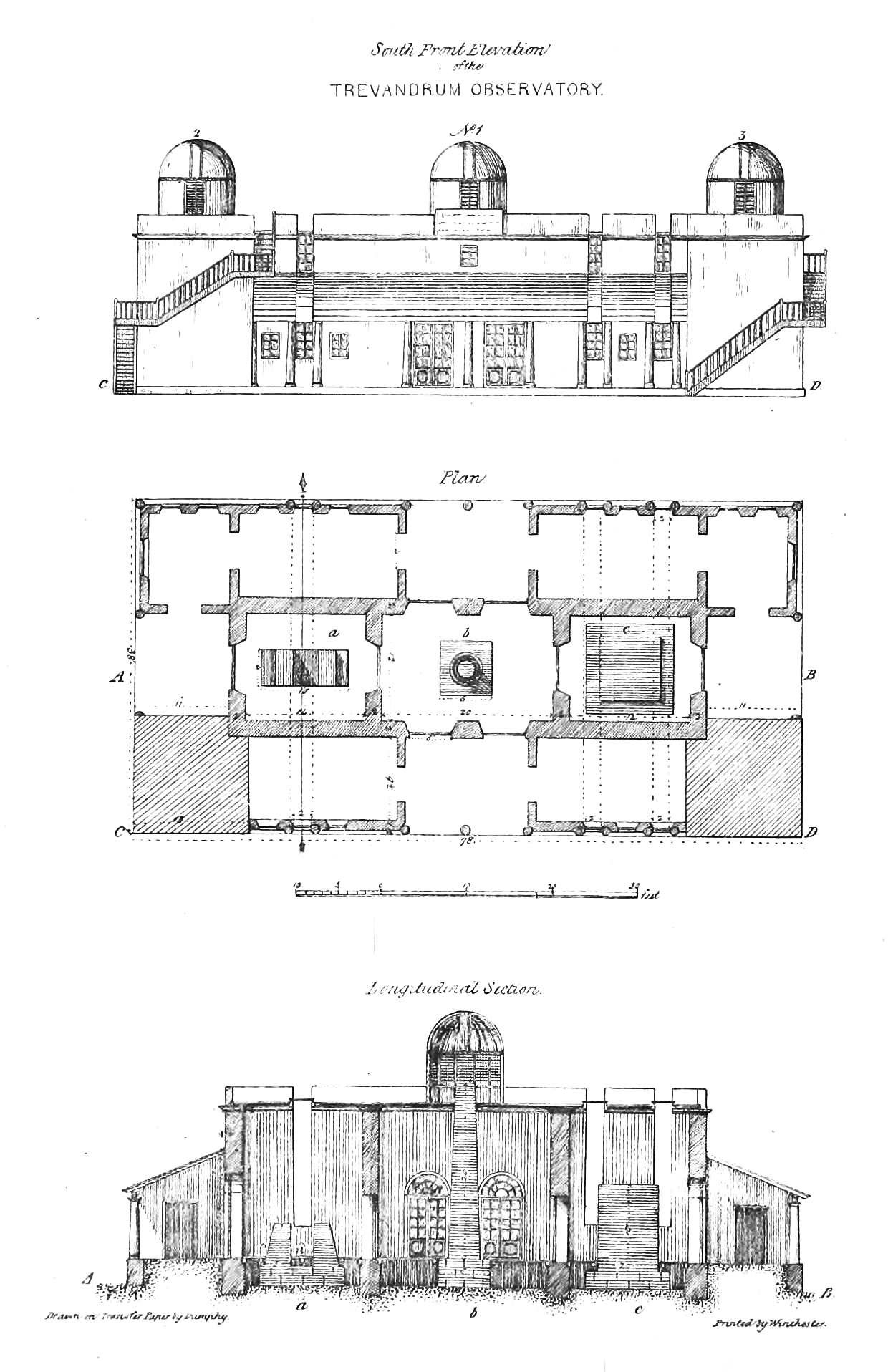
Plan of the Travancore observatory (1837)

Caldecott was born in Finsbury in London where his father, also John, and mother Susannah lived. He was christened on 1 November 1801 at St Luke's Church. John Caldecott (junior) went to India in 1820 on the Mulgrave Castle and reached Bombay in May 1821. He worked at Apollo Cotton as an assistant to Daniel West who was a family friend. A relative, William West had an interest in telescopes and microscopes as an evening amusement and this sparked off a scientific interest in John Caldecott. In 1832 he was posted as a commercial agent at the Indian port of Allepey (now Alappuzha) and he saw the need for an astronomical observatory there. This idea was aired in 1836, supported by the Resident Colonel James Stuart Fraser and approved by Raja Swathi Thirunal Rama Varma of Travancore. An observatory was constructed at Trivandrum. The building was constructed by Captain Horsley of the Madras Engineers. Opened in 1837, Caldecott was appointed as director. Two mural circles, a transit and equatorial telescopes were installed at the observatory. In April 1841, he also brought in instruments to measure the magnetic field of the Earth. He was interested in examining the magnetic field of the Earth at various parts, a scheme inspired by Alexander von Humboldt. He was also very interested in matters of the temperature of the core of the Earth. He published his observations extensively and pursued these ideas until his death.

His measurements of the temperature of the ground at different depths in Trivandrum allowed him (and J.D. Forbes who commented on his observations) to point out errors in the assertions of Professor A. Kupffer, of the Imperial Academy of St. Petersburg who said that the Earth is about 6 degrees cooler than the air (based on measurements in Russia) and pointed out that Bossingault was wrong in assuming that the temperature underground below a depth of one foot was constant. He made observations on the solar eclipse of 21 December 1843 at Parrat near the origin of the Mahé River and noticed Baily's beads. He made observations of several comets. He also collaborated with Thomas Glanville Taylor of Madras and examined the magnetic field variations in southern India.

Caldecott married Selina, daughter of James Somerville Darby of Dublin on 8 November 1825 at Bombay. This however did not work out well and she returned to England in 1827. He married again in 1835 to Sophia Rodgers at Allepey. Caldecott was elected to the Royal Society as well as the Royal Astronomical Society in 1840. Caldecott died in 1849 at Trivandrum and his work was continued by Reverend Josiah Sperschneider until his position was succeeded by John Allan Broun at the Trivandrum Observatory.
