= John Hirst (businessman) =

British businessman

John Raymond Hirst CBE is a British businessman. He was the chief executive officer of the UK Met Office from 2007 to 2014.

Hirst was born in Cyprus in 1952, and moved to England as a child. He studied economics at Leeds University, and then joined PwC, the professional services firm, as an accountant. He later moved to ICI, becoming head of the Specialty Chemical Division. In 1998, he took up the post of Chief Executive at electronic parts distributor Premier Farnell; in 2005, he was pushed out by the chairman, Sir Peter Gershon, who cited poor shareholder value as the trigger.

Hirst was appointed Commander of the Order of the British Empire (CBE) in the 2014 New Year Honours for services to meteorology.

== Sources ==
- Executive - Management —MetOffice
