= Battle of Alford =

Part of the Scottish Civil War (1645)

Coordinates: 57°14′17″N 2°43′26″W

- Part of the Scottish Civil War
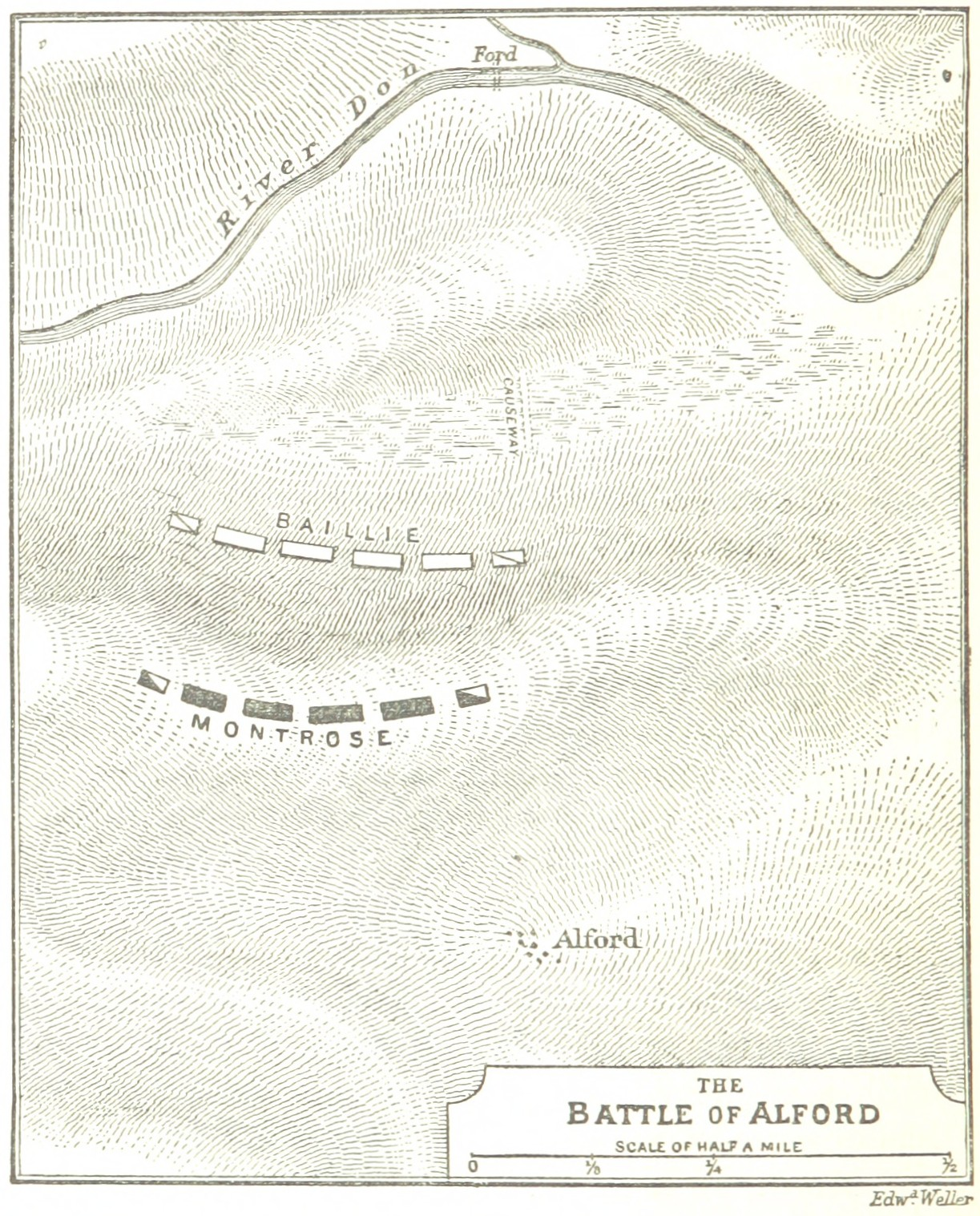
- Map of the battle of Alford by Edward Weller
Date	2 July 1645
Location	Alford, Aberdeenshire
Result	Royalist/Irish Victory

Belligerents
Royalists; Irish Brigade	Covenanters

Commanders and leaders
Lord Montrose; George, Lord Gordon; James Gordon, 2nd Viscount Aboyne; Manus O'Cahan	General William Baillie; Alexander Lindsay, 1st Earl of Balcarres

Strength
2,000 foot 250–300 cavalry	2,000 foot 5–600 cavalry

Casualties and losses
Several hundred	1,500

Registered battlefield
- Designated: 21 March 2011
- Reference no.: BTL1

The Battle of Alford was an engagement of the Scottish Civil War. It took place near the village of Alford, Aberdeenshire, on 2 July 1645. During the battle, the Royalist general James Graham, 1st Marquess of Montrose defeated the forces of the Covenanter-dominated Scottish government, commanded by William Baillie.

The battlefield is included in the Inventory of Historic Battlefields in Scotland and protected by Historic Scotland under the Historic Environment (Amendment) Act 2011.

== Background ==
Following the Scottish Parliament's decision to intervene in the First English Civil War on the Parliamentarian side, King Charles I had appointed Montrose as his Captain-General in Scotland and charged him with conducting the Royalist resistance. It was hoped that by carrying out a disruptive campaign in Scotland, Montrose would tie down government troops that would otherwise be used in the war in England.

Aided by 2,000 men sent by Confederate Ireland, Montrose won surprise victories at Tippermuir and Aberdeen in September 1644. His troops plundered large parts of the west Highlands that winter, before routing and destroying the forces of key government supporter the Marquess of Argyll at Inverlochy on 2 February. Finally, Montrose defeated a larger government army under Sir John Urry at Auldearn on 9 May.

Following Auldearn, the commander of the Irish contingent, Alasdair Mac Colla, departed for the western Highlands in an attempt to raise more men. Montrose himself made an effort to engage the remaining Covenanter army under Major-General Baillie. Baillie, a veteran soldier, had seen his forces reduced in size by the controlling body of the Scottish Parliament, the Committee of Estates, which had the power to overrule his orders. The Committee, which comprised the Earl of Argyll, the Earls of Crawford and Tullibardine, and the Lords of Elcho, Burleigh, and Balcarres, together with a number of Calvinist clergy, had ordered the detachment of around 1,200 of Baillie's most experienced foot to create a second army, intended to be commanded by the Earl of Lindsay. Some of the resulting gaps were filled by inexperienced militia. Conscious of the weakened state of his army, Baillie spent the early summer months trying to evade contact with Montrose, and both forces manoeuvred through Moray and Aberdeenshire for several weeks in an attempt to secure an advantage.

Montrose caught Baillie on 24 June near Keith, but the latter formed up for battle in a strong defensive position. Montrose refused to attack and, after several days of waiting, moved his force on and across the River Don. Baillie was now compelled to follow, otherwise Montrose would have had a clear route of march into central Scotland. By 1 July, Montrose occupied high ground near the village of Alford, probably at Gallows Hill. Early on the morning of 2 July, he received word that the Covenanters were rapidly approaching the ford of the Don and made a decision to attack, mainly as he knew that Lindsay was finally en route to reinforce Baillie.

== Battle ==
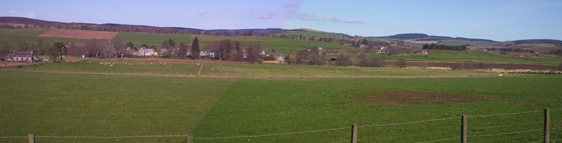
The site of the Battle of Alford

The two armies appear to have been roughly equal in size, though Baillie later claimed the Royalists outnumbered them. Up to 1,000 of Baillie's troops may have been local militia hastily pressed into service just before the battle. Baillie's position was further weakened by the presence of representatives of the Committee of Estates on his chain of command in the person of the Earl of Balcarres.

In Mac Colla's absence, the Irish troops supporting Montrose were commanded by Col. Manus O'Cahan, who showed a high degree of military discipline in the coming battle by unleashing his men at the critical point. This was the first battle where Montrose's Irish contingent did not outnumber his Scottish troops. Thanks to the presence of the Strathbogie and other Gordon regiments, Montrose also now had many more Lowlanders than Highlanders.

=== Order of battle and deployments ===
- Royalist (James Graham, 1st Marquess of Montrose)
  - Irish Brigade (600 men) (Col. Manus O'Cahan)
    - Thomas Laghtnan's Regiment
    - James McDonnell's Regiment / O'Cahan's Regiment
  - Strathbogie Regiment (500)
  - Col. William Gordon of Monymore's Regiment (200)
  - Col. James Farquharson of Inverey's Regiment (300)
  - Clan MacDonell of Glengarry (200)
  - Lord Gordon's Regiment of Horse (200)
  - Viscount Aboyne's Regiment of Horse (300)
- Covenanter (Maj-Gen. William Baillie)
  - Infantry regiments (2,400)
    - Lord Elcho's Regiment
    - Earl of Cassilis' Regiment
    - Earl of Callendar's Regiment
    - Earl of Glencairn's Regiment
    - Earl of Lanark's Regiment
  - Cavalry (380)
    - Earl of Balcarres' Horse
    - Sir James Halkett's Horse
    - Sir William Forbes of Craigevar's Horse
    - John Forbes of Leslie's Horse
    - Master of Forbes' Horse

Following Montrose's occupation of high ground overlooking the Don, Baillie did not want to risk crossing the river, seeing that his troops would be vulnerable to attack before they could form up. It was afterwards rumoured that Balcarres, a member of the Committee of Estates and Baillie's cavalry commander, insisted on giving battle, and Baillie later wrote that he was unhappy about engaging as he felt they were outnumbered. Other accounts, however, suggest that despite Montrose moving his whole army down to within musket shot of Baillie, Baillie was misled into believing he faced only a Royalist rearguard, as the majority of their troops were concealed on the hill's reverse slope. Montrose had drawn up his army with the majority of the infantry in the centre and the cavalry on the flanks: Aboyne on the left and Gordon on the right, each strengthened by a unit of Irish foot. As Baillie was still in the process of moving forward, he attempted to use a stretch of marshy ground, intersected by ditches and pools, to strengthen his position.

=== Montrose attacks ===
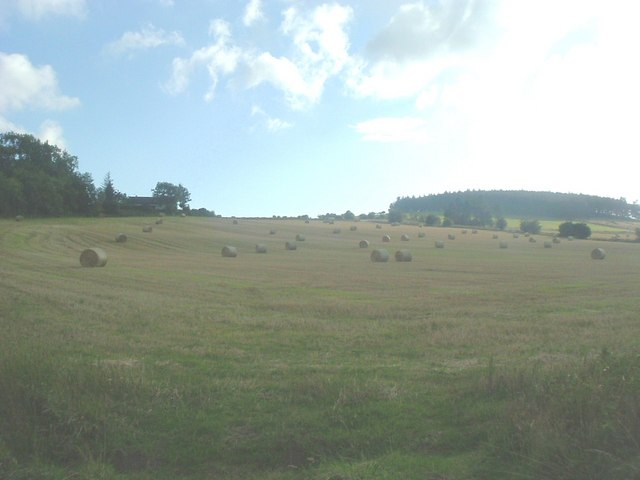
The view up from the battlefield towards Gallow Hill, where Montrose drew up his army

Montrose waited until Balcarres' cavalry was across the river, and the infantry was in the process of crossing, before ordering Lord Gordon's horse to attack Balcarres. A fierce fight ensued around the ford between the two groups of cavalry. Balcarres threw back the attack, but Gordon regrouped and attacked again, supported by Thomas Laghtnan's regiment of Irish infantry. Balcarres' cavalry broke and retreated: Baillie, now having no choice but to commit to the battle, ordered Halkett forward but the latter was driven off by the Royalist left wing under Aboyne.

Baillie and his infantry had now crossed the Don only to witness their cavalry routed. Baillie responded to the threat of being outflanked by extending his line: however to do so he had to deploy his troops only three ranks deep. Montrose finally ordered his infantry to attack: Baillie's men initially held firm and refused to give quarter. However, when some of the Royalist cavalry under Gordon returned and attacked them on the flank and rear, they broke and began to flee from the battlefield. It is likely that by being deployed only three lines deep they were unable to turn and effectively face the cavalry assault. The difficulties presented by escaping across a ford meant that the rout was particularly vicious: government losses were about 1,500 of their 2,000 infantry, although much of their cavalry escaped, along with Baillie, Balcarres and other commanders. Cassilis' and Glencairn's regiments in particular were reduced to little more than 100 men each. Primary sources suggest that the pursuit of the defeated Covenanter infantry went on until the early evening, over a distance of 9 miles.

The Royalists lost several hundred men, including Lord Gordon - a serious loss to their cause, and in the long run possibly the most significant outcome of the battle. Nevertheless, the battle was one of the few bright moments for the Royalists in the aftermath of the Battle of Naseby, only two weeks earlier. Montrose's success helped convince Charles that it was worthwhile to continue the fight in England.

== Aftermath ==
After the defeat an unhappy Baillie tendered his resignation to the Committee of Estates, but was compelled to stay in command until his intended replacement, Maj-Gen. Monro, could be recalled from the war in Ireland. The Committee appointed a deputation to advise him on tactics, although many of those involved had already been defeated by Montrose at some point, and their interference in the next engagement was to prove disastrous.

Montrose was now at last in a position to march towards the south of the country, where in mid-August he would face a freshly raised government force at the Battle of Kilsyth, the largest battle of the conflict in Scotland.

== In culture ==
The Historic Scotland report commented that despite its importance the battle "has drawn little popular attention" outside the immediate area, but notes that a fragment of a ballad called The Battle of Alford has survived, though the surviving verses do not relate to the fighting itself. It also noted that the great-grandfather of James Watt, a Kildrummy crofter named Thomas Watt, was among the militia conscripted to fight on the government side, and was killed there.
