= Inventory of Historic Battlefields in Scotland =

The Inventory of Historic Battlefields is a heritage register listing nationally significant battlefields in Scotland, which is maintained by Historic Environment Scotland (HES). The list of battlefields is intended to guide landowners, developers, local authorities and the Scottish Ministers in the future development of these areas to protect the historic significance and archaeological potential of these sites. The inventory entries summarise historic sources, archaeological evidence and finds, significance, and provide a map defining the extent of the battlefield. Selection criteria used for identifying nationally important sites were: historical association; physical remains and archaeological potential; cultural association; and landscape context. The inventory is maintained under the terms of the Ancient Monuments and Archaeological Areas Act 1979, and HES must be consulted on any proposals considered to affect an Inventory battlefield.

The Inventory was published for consultation in December 2010 by Historic Scotland, an agency of the Scottish Government, and launched as the Inventory in May 2011. Seventeen sites were included in the first phase of the inventory, with a number of other sites under consideration for inclusion at a later date. By the end of 2012 the inventory had expanded to 39 sites. Since 2015 the list has been maintained by Historic Environment Scotland, which took over the roles and responsibilities of Historic Scotland.

As of 2025 there are 40 battlefields on the inventory. The most recent addition was the Battle of Sark, which was listed in 2016.

== Battlefields on the Inventory ==
ID	Battle	Date	Co-ordinates	Council area	Belligerents	Campaign	Outcome
BTL1	Battle of Alford	2 July 1645	57.238°N 2.723°W	Aberdeenshire	Scottish Royalists / Government troops	Wars of the Three Kingdoms	Royalist victory
BTL2	Battle of Ancrum Moor	27 February 1545	55.536°N 2.607°W	Scottish Borders	Kingdom of Scotland / Kingdom of England	Rough Wooing	Scottish victory
BTL3	Battle of Auldearn	9 May 1645	57.571°N 3.813°W	Highland	Scottish Royalists / Government troops	Wars of the Three Kingdoms	Royalist victory
BTL4	Battle of Bannockburn	24 June 1314	56.092°N 3.915°W	Stirling	Kingdom of Scotland / Kingdom of England	Wars of Scottish Independence	Scottish victory
BTL5	Battle of Bothwell Bridge	22 June 1679	55.795°N 4.057°W	South Lanarkshire	Covenanter army / Government troops	Covenanter Rebellion of 1679	Government victory
BTL6	Battle of Culloden	16 April 1746	57.478°N 4.097°W	Highland	Jacobites / Government troops	Jacobite rising of 1745	Government victory
BTL7	Battle of Dunbar II	3 September 1650	55.980°N 2.490°W	East Lothian	Kingdom of Scotland / Commonwealth of England	Wars of the Three Kingdoms	English victory
BTL8	Battle of Dupplin Moor	11 August 1332	56.353°N 3.538°W	Perth & Kinross	Loyalist Scots / Rebels supporting Edward Balliol, and English allies	Second War of Scottish Independence	Balliol victory
BTL9	Battle of Falkirk II	17 January 1746	55.987°N 3.814°W	Falkirk	Jacobites / Government troops	Jacobite rising of 1745	Jacobite victory
BTL10	Battle of Glen Shiel	10 June 1719	57.166°N 5.317°W	Highland	Spanish troops and Jacobites / Government troops	Jacobite rising of 1719	Government victory
BTL11	Battle of Harlaw	24 July 1411	57.308°N 2.411°W	Aberdeenshire	Lowland clans under Alexander Stewart, Earl of Mar / Allies of Donald of Islay, Lord of the Isles	Feud between Clan MacDonald and Stewart royal family	Inconclusive
BTL12	Battle of Killiecrankie	27 July 1689	56.753°N 3.796°W	Perth & Kinross	Jacobites / Government troops	Jacobite rising of 1689	Jacobite victory
BTL13	Battle of Kilsyth	15 August 1645	55.984°N 4.018°W	North Lanarkshire	Scottish Royalists / Government troops	Wars of the Three Kingdoms	Royalist victory
BTL14	Battle of Philiphaugh	13 September 1645	55.542°N 2.868°W	Scottish Borders	Scottish Royalists / Government troops	Wars of the Three Kingdoms	Government victory
BTL15	Battle of Pinkie Cleugh	10 September 1547	55.933°N 3.023°W	East Lothian	Kingdom of Scotland / Kingdom of England	Rough Wooing	English victory
BTL16	Battle of Prestonpans	21 September 1745	55.960°N 2.950°W	East Lothian	Jacobites / Government troops	Jacobite rising of 1745	Jacobite victory
BTL17	Battle of Sheriffmuir	13 November 1715	56.195°N 3.910°W	Stirling	Jacobites / Government troops	Jacobite rising of 1715	Inconclusive
BTL18	Battle of Barra	22 May and 23 May 1308	57.335°N 2.318°W	Aberdeenshire	Scottish Royal Army / Scottish opponents of Bruce under John Comyn, 3rd Earl of Buchan	Wars of Scottish Independence	Royalist victory
BTL19	Battle of Carbisdale	27 April 1650	57.916°N 4.421°W	Highland	Covenanter army / Scottish Royalists	Wars of the Three Kingdoms	Covenanter victory
BTL20	Battle of Cromdale	30 April and 1 May 1690	57.195°N 3.292°W	Highland	Jacobites / Government troops	Jacobite rising of 1689	Government victory
BTL21	Battle of Drumclog	1 June 1679	55.631°N 4.184°W	South Lanarkshire	Covenanter army / Government troops	Covenanter Rebellion of 1679	Covenanter victory
BTL22	Battle of Fyvie	28 October 1644 - 30 October 1644	57.433°N 2.395°W	Aberdeenshire	Covenanter army / Scottish Royalists	Wars of the Three Kingdoms	Royalist victory
BTL23	Battle of Inverkeithing II	20 July 1651	56.025°N 3.413°W	Fife	Kingdom of Scotland / Commonwealth of England	Wars of the Three Kingdoms	English victory
BTL24	Battle of Inverlochy II	2 February 1645	56.832°N 5.075°W	Highland	Covenanter army / Scottish Royalists	Wars of the Three Kingdoms	Royalist victory
BTL25	Battle of Linlithgow Bridge	4 September 1526	55.971°N 3.634°W	West Lothian	Earl of Lennox / Earl of Arran	Feud between Clan Douglas and Stewart royal family	Douglas victory
BTL26	Battle of Mulroy	4 August 1688	56.903°N 4.839°W	Highland	Clan Mackintosh and Government Independent Highland Company / Clan MacDonald of Keppoch and Clan Cameron	Feud between Clan Cameron and Clan Mackintosh	Cameron & MacDonald victory
BTL27	Battle of Rullion Green	28 November 1666	55.855°N 3.164°W	Midlothian	Covenanter army / Scottish Royalists	Scottish Covenanter Wars	Royalist victory
BTL28	Battle of Stirling Bridge	11 September 1297	56.131°N 3.932°W	Stirling	Kingdom of Scotland / Kingdom of England	Wars of Scottish Independence	Scottish victory
BTL29	Blar na Léine	15 July 1544	57.030°N 4.819°W	Highland	Clan Fraser and Clan Grant / Clan MacDonald and Clan Cameron	Scottish clan wars	MacDonald / Cameron victory
BTL30	Battle of Darnick	29 July 1526	55.601°N 2.745°W	Scottish Borders			
BTL31	Battle of Dunbar I	27 April 1296	55.97692°N 2.52119°W	East Lothian	Kingdom of Scotland / Kingdom of England	Wars of Scottish Independence	English victory
BTL32	Battle of Dunkeld	21 August 1689	56.565°N 3.585°W	Perth & Kinross	Jacobites / Government troops	Jacobite rising of 1689	Government victory
BTL33	Battle of Glenlivet	3 October 1594	57.352°N 3.257°W	Moray	Catholic clans / Protestant clans	Clan feud	Catholic victory
BTL34	Battle of Inverlochy I	September 1431	56.827°N 5.084°W	Highland	Alexander of Islay Lord of the Isles / Crown forces	Clan feud	Rebel victory
BTL35	Battle of Langside	13 May 1568	55.830°N 4.264°W	Glasgow	King's Men / Queen's Men	Marian civil war	King's Men victory
BTL36	Battle of Loudoun Hill	10 May 1307	55.609°N 4.210°W	East Ayrshire	Kingdom of Scotland / Kingdom of England	Wars of Scottish Independence	Scottish victory
BTL37	Battle of Roslin	24 February 1303	55.855°N 3.164°W	Midlothian	Kingdom of Scotland / Kingdom of England	Wars of Scottish Independence	Scottish victory
BTL38	Battle of Sauchieburn	11 June 1488	56.068°N 3.916°W	Stirling	Royalist / Rebels	Second rebellion against James III	Rebel victory
BTL39	Battle of Tippermuir	1 September 1644	56.391°N 3.525°W	Perth and Kinross	Royalist / Covenanters	Wars of the Three Kingdoms	Royalist victory
BTL40	Battle of Sark	23 October 1448	54.986°N 3.074°W	Dumfries and Galloway	Kingdom of Scotland / Kingdom of England	Anglo-Scottish Wars	Scottish victory

== See also ==
- Registered Battlefields (UK)
