= Battle of Kilsyth =

Battle that took place during the Wars of the Three Kingdoms

Coordinates: 55.98427°N 4.01885°W

- Part of the Scottish Civil War
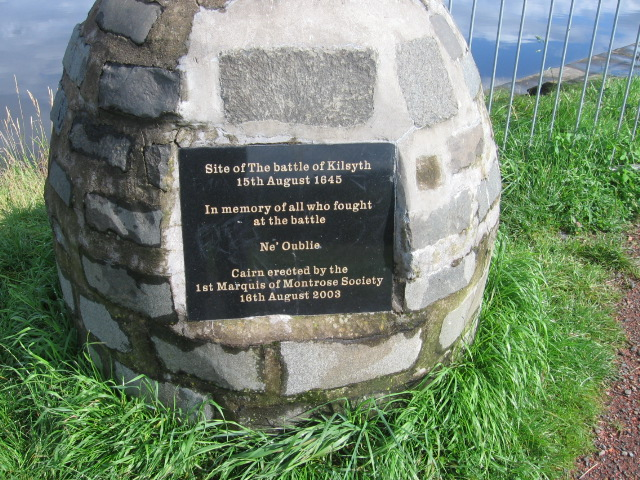
- Cairn in memory of the Battle of Kilsyth
Date	15 August 1645
Location	Kilsyth, about 10 miles south-west of Stirling, Scotland
Result	Royalist/Irish Victory

Belligerents
Royalists; Irish Brigade	Covenanters

Commanders and leaders
Marquess of Montrose; Alasdair MacColla	William Baillie; Alexander Lindsay

Strength
3,000 foot 500 cavalry	7,000 foot 800 cavalry

Casualties and losses
Light	c. 4,500

Registered battlefield
- Designated: 21 March 2011
- Reference no.: BTL13

The Battle of Kilsyth, fought on 15 August 1645 near Kilsyth, was an engagement of the Wars of the Three Kingdoms. The largest battle of the conflict in Scotland, it resulted in victory for the Royalist general Montrose over the forces of the Covenanter-dominated Scottish Parliament, and marked the end of General William Baillie's pursuit of the Royalists.

== Background ==
Between mid-1644 and 1645, Montrose had fought a successful disruptive campaign around Scotland, intended to tie down Scottish government troops and prevent their aiding the Parliamentarian side in the First English Civil War. Leading a force built around an Irish Confederate brigade under Alasdair Mac Colla, Montrose had beaten the Covenanters at Tippermuir, Aberdeen, Inverlochy, Auldearn and Alford. Following the bloody Royalist victory at Alford on 2 July 1645, there remained only a single intact government force in Scotland, under the command of the experienced professional soldier William Baillie.

Baillie and his army were at Perth, attending the meeting of the Scottish Estates. He had been given command of a mixture of new, untrained levies from Fife, a number of regular regiments withdrawn from England, and the remnants of several regiments already defeated by Montrose at Auldearn and Alford. His cavalry, led by Lord Balcarres, was mainly regular dragoons. In addition to these troops, the Earl of Lanark had raised a new levy of 1,000 infantry and 500 cavalry from the estate of his brother, the Duke of Hamilton, in Clydesdale, and was en route north to join the main body.

When news of this troop movement reached Montrose, he decided to confront these forces individually, before they could join up. Marching from Dunkeld he skirted Baillie's force at Perth and travelled via Kinross, Glenfarg and Alloa, crossing the River Forth near Stirling, and circumnavigating Stirling Castle. By nightfall on 14 August, the army was camped in a meadow near Colzium, by Kilsyth, in the area around Colzium Castle. This area is still known as Cavalry Park in memory of the event.

Baillie learned of Montrose's advance almost immediately, but it took a little time for its purpose to become apparent. Realising that his opponent had gained an advantage and that Lanark's forces were in danger, he moved his men southward, reaching Stirling by the line of the modern A9 road. On the same night as Montrose reached Colzium, Baillie was only three miles off at Hollinbush. He arrived late and his men had little rest.

Overnight, his scouts located the Royalist encampment, and at dawn the next morning his troops were on the move and, marching directly across country, reaching the village of Banton. This gave the Covenanters the higher ground around the eastern rim of the hollow occupied by the Royalist infantry.

== Deployments ==
Montrose had been reinforced at Dunkeld by 800 high-quality infantry and 400 cavalry led by Viscount Aboyne. He retained at least 500 of his Irish troops, a large number of Lowland infantry from the Gordon estates, and a regiment of Athollmen under Patrick Graham of Inchbrackie, as well as up to 1400 Highlanders from western clans: a total of around 3000 foot, with up to 600 cavalry and dragoons. Baillie is stated to have had up to 7,000 infantry based on Royalist accounts, though 3,500 may be a more accurate figure. While four of the government regiments were regulars, and a further unit under Lieutenant-Colonel Kennedy was made up of the remains of three veteran regiments from Alford and Auldearn, a large proportion of Baillie's foot was composed of the three newly raised regiments of levies from Fife, led by the lairds of Fordell, Ferny and Cambo. On news of the Royalist advance, the levies had already attempted to desert en masse, and had to be forcibly brought back.

- Royalist (James Graham, 1st Marquess of Montrose)
  - Infantry regiments
    - Irish Brigade (Alasdair Mac Colla)
    - Mac Colla's Lifeguard
    - Strathbogie Regiment
    - Col. Patrick Graham of Inchbrackie's Regiment
    - Col. William Gordon of Monymore's Regiment
    - Col. James Farquharson of Inverey's Regiment
    - Clan MacDonell of Glengarry / western clans
  - Cavalry
    - Col. Nathaniel Gordon's Regiment
    - Viscount Aboyne's Regiment
    - Earl of Airlie's Regiment
    - Viscount Aboyne's Regiment of Dragoons
    - Captain John Mortimer's Regiment of Dragoons (Irish)
- Covenanter (Maj-Gen. William Baillie)
  - Infantry regiments
    - Marquess of Argyll's Regiment
    - Earl of Crawford-Lindsay's Regiment
    - Col. Robert Home's Regiment
    - Earl of Lauderdale's Regiment
    - Lt-Col. John Kennedy's Battalion
    - Col. James Arnot of Ferny's Regiment
    - Col. John Henderson of Fordell's Regiment
    - Sir Thomas Morton of Cambo's Regiment
  - Cavalry
    - Earl of Balcarres' Regiment
    - Col. Harie Barclay's Regiment

== Battle ==
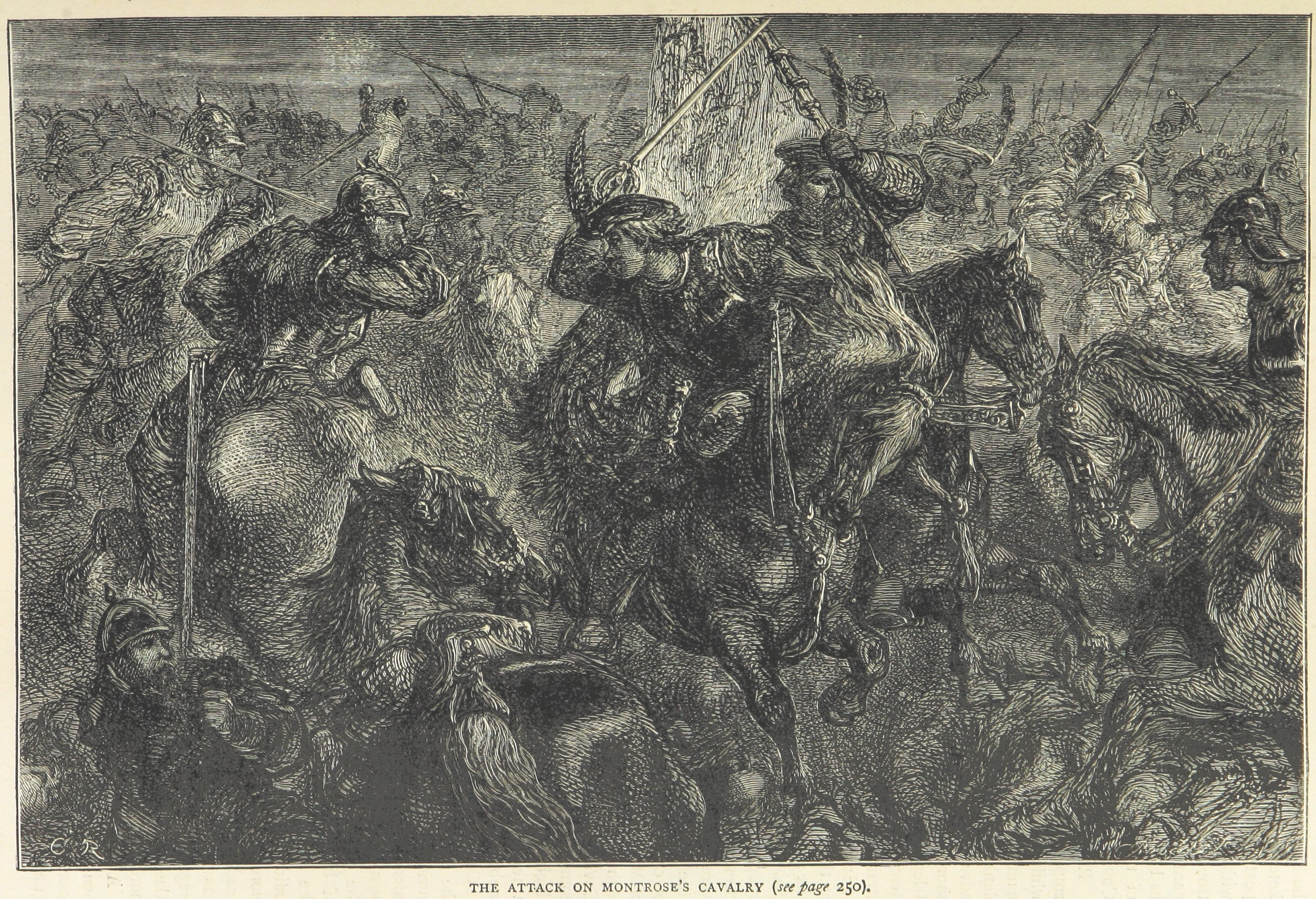
The Covenanters Attack the Royalist Cavalry

The Royalist troops were clearly visible, undisturbed by the arrival of the main army of their enemies. Having a healthy respect for his opposition, and appreciating that his own forces had already marched several miles in full kit, Baillie decided to take positions where he was and wait for Lanark's force to appear. If Lanark arrived on the field, Baillie would have Montrose trapped between his force and the reinforcements; and if Montrose decided to attack Lanark as he arrived, Baillie could advance against the Royalist army from the rear. A direct attack by Montrose against the Covenanter line would face daunting high ground held by a numerically superior opponent.

Although Baillie's decision was sound, he was not allowed to adhere to it. His orders were subject to the approval of the "Committee of Estates", consisting of the Earls of Argyll, Crawford and Tullibardine, and the Lords Elcho, and Balfour of Burleigh, together with a number of Calvinist clergymen. Worried by the possibility of Montrose escaping to fight another day, they ordered a flank march around the Royalist position. Baillie protested against the redeployment, but was overruled.

Clashes soon broke out as the Covenanter army made their flank march, with the left wing of Baillie's force (now the rear of the flanking column) attacking the MacLean infantry occupying cottages on Montrose's left flank, and the cavalry on the Covenanter right flank (or van) attacking the Royalist cavalry. Other Covenanter and Royalist units joined the fray, acting without orders. Montrose seized the unexpected opportunity, and sent his cavalry and Highlanders against the now disrupted Covenanter column. The mass of the Royalist infantry subsequently joined in the attack. Baillie's army soon broke and ran in the face of the ferocious "Highland Charge".

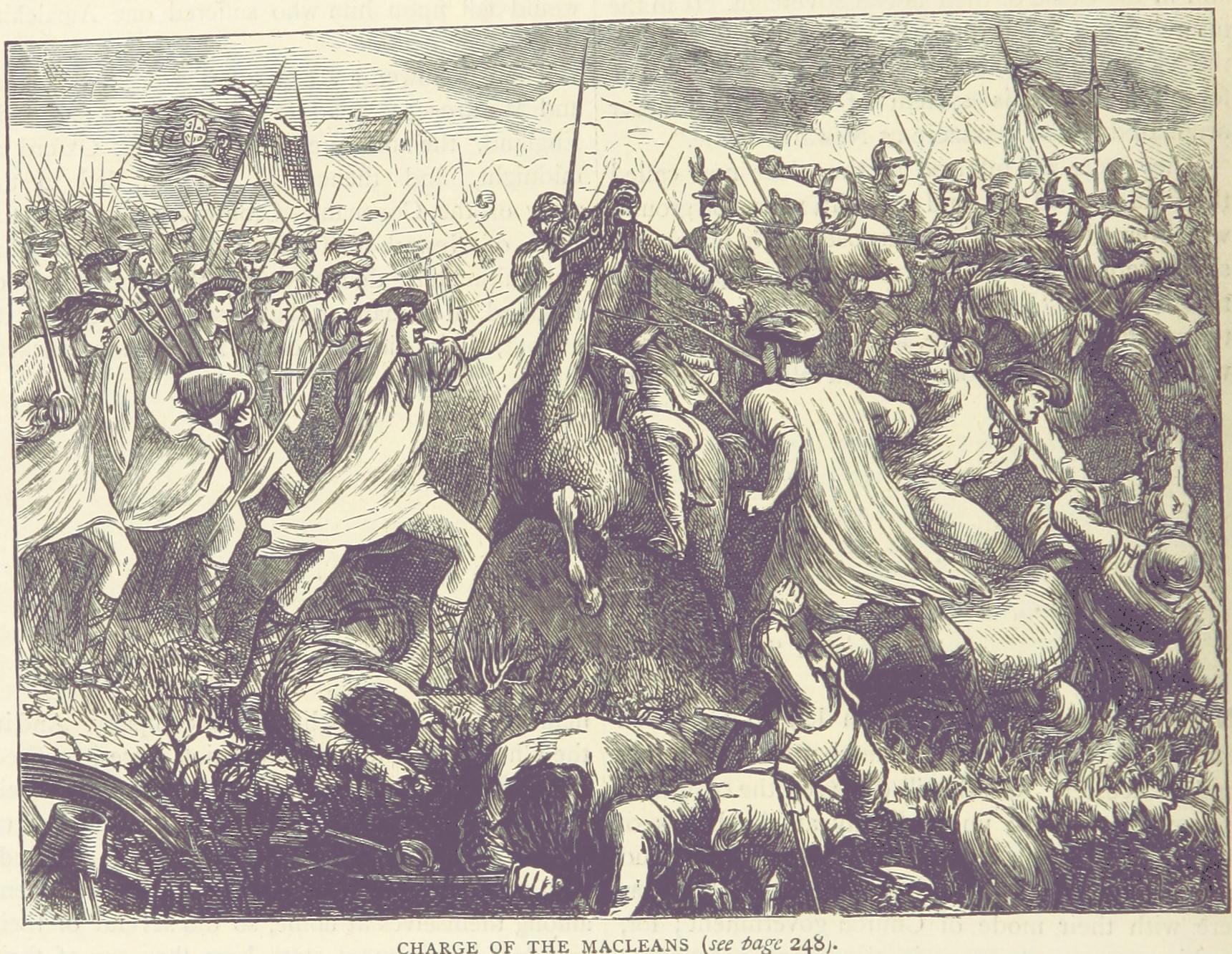
The Charge of Clan Maclean

Approximately three-quarters of the Covenanter troops perished. Baillie himself fled south with an escort of cavalry, but was caught in the notorious Dullatur Bog, a marshy area lying between the head waters of the Kelvin and the Bonny. He managed to escape, although he left most of his escort behind, and reached safety at Stirling Castle. During construction of the Forth and Clyde Canal, the bodies of several troopers, one still seated on a horse, were recovered from the bog.

== Aftermath ==
Lanark's forces were told of the defeat, and dispersed. Lanark himself and the Committee of Estates escaped across the border to England. Briefly, Montrose found himself undisputed master of Scotland, and proceeded to Glasgow, where he summoned a parliament in the name of the King. Unknown to Montrose, the victory was too late; the Battle of Naseby had already been lost and the Royalist cause was in ruins. News of the Scottish Royalist victory compelled the main Covenanter army under Leven to abandon the Siege of Hereford and retreat. Montrose made an attempt to move south in support of the king, but was himself decisively defeated at Philiphaugh on 13 September 1645.

The battle and the Royalist campaign of 1644–1645 in general feature in the 1937 novel And No Quarter by the Irish writer Maurice Walsh, told from the perspective of two members of O'Cahan's Regiment.

== Battlefield ==
Ordnance Survey maps mark the battlefield as being in the vicinity of Banton Loch, which was expanded in the 18th century. The battlefield has been inventoried and protected by Historic Scotland under the Scottish Historical Environment Policy of 2009.
