= Battle of Lagganmore =

Battle in 1646 at Lagganmore in Glen Euchar, west of Loch Scammadale

Coordinates: 56.324°N 5.482°W

- Part of the Scottish Civil War
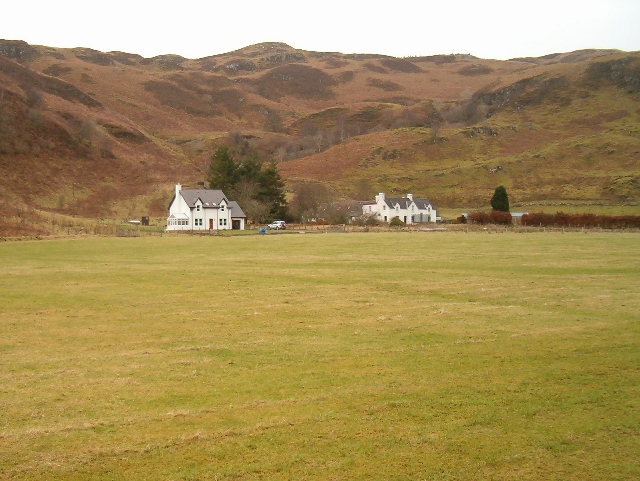
- The settlement of Lagganmore in modern times
Date	1646
Location	Lagganmore, in Glen Euchar, west of Loch Scammadale, Scotland.
Result	Royalist/Irish victory

Belligerents
Royalists: Clan Donald; Clan MacDougall; Clan MacAulay; Irish Brigade	Covenanters: Clan Campbell; Clan MacCallum; Clan MacNaghten

Commanders and leaders
Alasdair MacColla; Lachlan MacLean	John Campbell; Donald Campbell; Zachary MacCallum †

Strength
c. 1,500	c. 700
- Scotland

The Battle of Lagganmore took place in 1646 at Lagganmore in Glen Euchar, west of Loch Scammadale. It was part of the Wars of the Three Kingdoms, though in this case the battle, which was fought largely between Highland clansmen, incorporated a long running feud between Clan MacDonald and Clan Campbell.

The Royalist forces of Alasdair Mac Colla, supported by men of Clan MacDougall and Clan MacAulay, defeated the pro-government forces of the Campbells who were supported by Clan MacCallum.

== Background ==
The battle took place in the context of the Scottish Civil War. Mac Colla and a group of Irish professional soldiers were sent to Scotland in June 1644 by Confederate Ireland, ostensibly to aid the Royalist party there, at the instigation of the Earl of Antrim. Mac Colla joined with the Royalist Lord Montrose and fought a successful campaign against the Scottish government in 1644–5. However Antrim, Mac Colla and many of their recruits in Scotland were members of Clan Donald, and it appears that a significant objective of Antrim's plan was to recover ancestral lands in Kintyre and elsewhere from which the Clan Donald South had been driven by the pro-government Clan Campbell.

After leaving Montrose's forces in late 1645, Mac Colla, some of his Irish troops and a large contingent of MacDonald and other clansmen returned to Kintyre and renewed their attacks on Clan Campbell lands. Much of early 1646 was spent on a fruitless siege of Craignish Castle, during which Archibald Campbell, the Tutor of Craignish, repeatedly taunted Mac Colla by challenging him to single combat. In the spring of 1646, the Campbells raised a force to oppose them under the local gentry, John Campbell of Lochnell and Donald Campbell of Bragleen.

== The battle ==
The location and scale of Lagganmore meant that little was recorded in contemporary written sources. Most of what is known about the battle is derived from local folklore, albeit most of the traditions are fairly consistent with each other.

Bragleen and Lochnell's forces, largely consisting of men of Clan Campbell and several associated clans, assembled in Glen Euchar to attack Mac Colla. Another landowner Zachary MacCallum, or Malcolm, of Poltalloch also joined the battle. By tradition, this was supposedly as he happened to be in the area, but Poltalloch was well known as a political supporter of the Campbell chief Argyll so he and some of his men are likely to have already been with the Campbell forces. Mac Colla was said, at this point, to have had about 1,500 men, retaining a number of his veteran Irish troops along with some clan levies from the MacDougalls of Dunollie and the MacAulays of Ardincaple. The number of Campbells was possibly around 700.

The Campbells were attacked by the Royalist advance guard and routed. Lochnell escaped from the field and Bragleen was captured, though was supposed to have escaped later. Poltalloch was supposedly close to killing Mac Colla himself when he was struck down by an opponent armed with a scythe, though other traditions place his death elsewhere.

== Aftermath ==
The battle is notorious, in the folklore of the area, for an atrocity purportedly committed by the Royalist forces in its aftermath. Mac Colla's men were claimed to have driven a number of prisoners from the battle, along with Campbell women and children from the district, into a barn which was then set alight. Only two women (or alternatively one woman and Campbell of Bragleen) were said to have escaped from what became known as Sabhal nan Cnamh, the "Barn of Bones". The massacre was part of a series of revenge-driven atrocities committed by both sides in the conflict.
