= Battle of Auldearn =

Part of the Scottish Civil War (1645)

- Part of Scottish Civil War
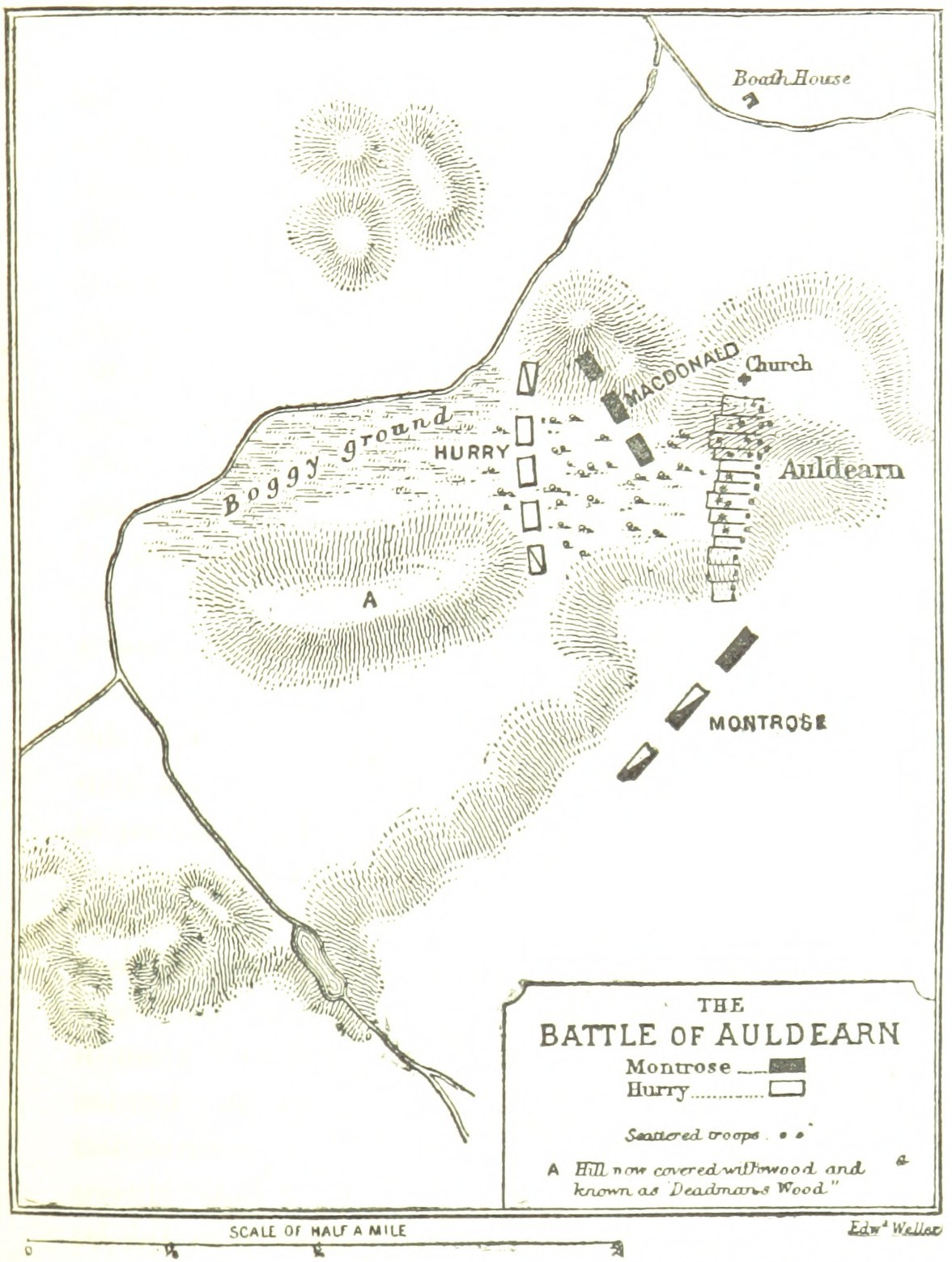
- Map of the battle of Auldearn by Edward Weller
Date	9 May 1645
Location	Auldearn, east of Nairn grid reference NH 916 554; 57°34′35″N 3°48′43″W
Result	Royalist/Irish Victory

Belligerents
Royalists; Irish Brigade	Covenanters

Commanders and leaders
Lord Montrose; Alexander MacDonald; Manus O'Cahan	Sir John Urry; Earl of Seaforth

Strength
1,300 foot 250 cavalry	3,600 foot 300 cavalry

Casualties and losses
Light	1,500

Registered battlefield
- Designated: 21 March 2011
- Reference no.: BTL3
- Location within Scotland

The Battle of Auldearn was an engagement of the Wars of the Three Kingdoms. It took place on 9 May 1645, in and around the village of Auldearn in Nairnshire. It resulted in a victory for the royalists, led by the Marquess of Montrose and Alasdair MacColla, over Sir John Urry and an army raised by the Covenanter-dominated Scottish government.

The pibroch Blár Allt Earrann commemorates the battle. The battlefield has been included in the Inventory of Historic Battlefields in Scotland and is protected by Historic Scotland under the Historic Environment (Amendment) Act 2011.

== Background ==
In mid-1644, after the Scottish Committee of Estates decided to intervene in the First English Civil War on the Parliamentarian side, Montrose had been given a commission by King Charles I to command his forces in Scotland. After initial setbacks, he was able to raise an army consisting partly of Highlanders and partly of professional troops sent by Confederate Ireland at the instigation of the Marquess of Antrim. Most of the Covenanter army had been sent into England, and Montrose began to threaten Covenanter control over the Highlands.

On 2 February 1645, Montrose won a complete victory over the pro-Covenanter Clan Campbell and its leader, the Earl of Argyll, at the Battle of Inverlochy. He then attempted to attack the Covenanter forces in the Lowlands, but found that many of his Highlanders were drifting home with plunder and the Covenanters were too strong. He fell back to the northeast, hoping to recruit more forces. In particular, he needed the support of Clan Gordon, who could provide at least some cavalry.

The Covenanters divided their forces. While Lieutenant General William Baillie remained based in Perth, he sent a detachment commanded by Sir John Urry to the north. Urry was an experienced soldier who had deserted the English Parliamentarians to join the Royalists in 1643, but had changed sides once again to join the Covenanters after their success at the Battle of Marston Moor in 1644.

Montrose, meanwhile, had made a couple of feints towards the Lowlands, but was unable to challenge Baillie's large army. On 18 April, he heard that Urry's army was threatening the Gordon lands. Montrose marched north to Skene, where he was rejoined on 30 April by Alasdair MacColla, who had been recruiting fresh forces in the western Highlands, and several contingents of Gordons. From Skene, Montrose advanced against Urry, who was near Elgin.

== Battle ==
As the area about Elgin was Covenanter in sympathy, Urry had plenty of information about Montrose's approach. He withdrew westwards, hoping to lure Montrose into a position where he could launch a surprise counter-attack. His army consisted of four regiments of foot commanded by Colonels Loudoun, Lothian, Buchanan and Sir Mungo Campbell of Lawers, the Mackenzies under the Earl of Seaforth, the levies of the Earl of Sutherland, 800 other local levies and 400 cavalry.

Hearing late on 8 May that Montrose had encamped at Auldearn, which was then a small hamlet, Urry advanced, hoping to catch the Royalists unawares at dawn. In his attempt to achieve surprise, he left his artillery some distance behind. Unfortunately for Urry, some of his men discharged their muskets to clear damp powder charges, thereby alerting the Royalists. Thus warned, Montrose hastily deployed his forces to counter-attack Urry.

On Montrose's right flank, Alastair MacColla commanded one Irish regiment and some Gordon infantry totalling about 500 men. They were deployed in some enclosures in front of Auldearn, and the Royal Standard was prominently displayed among them to convince Urry that the entire Royalist force was in this position. Montrose's main force was concealed in a hollow on MacColla's left flank. There were two Irish regiments and some Gordons fighting on foot (totalling about 800 musketeers and clansmen), and 200 Gordon horsemen led by Lord Aboyne and his younger brother, Lord Lewis Gordon.

Urry's four regular regiments of infantry advanced against the obvious position defended by Alasdair MacColla, while a small body of 50 cavalry attempted to outflank what they believed to be the Royalist left. The various levies and Urry's remaining cavalry remained in reserve. The impatient MacColla led an advance against the Covenanters but was forced back. Montrose rode up to the Gordon cavalry, who could hear the noise of battle but could not see what was going on, and claimed that the Macdonalds were driving all before them and were likely to claim all the glory. The Gordon horsemen charged out of the hollow. The small body of Covenanter cavalry trying to outflank MacColla was taken by surprise while trying to negotiate a bog and fled. Montrose's infantry followed his cavalry and advanced against the right flank of Urry's four infantry regiments, which broke under attack from all sides. Urry's three bodies of levies and his remaining cavalry fled the field.

The only part of Urry's army to make a stand was Clan MacLennan, styled the "Bannermen of Kintail", who, as standard bearers to Seaforth, chief of Clan Mackenzie, remained isolated during the Covenanters' flight. They refused to retreat and stood their ground in the face of the Royalist onslaught, refusing to give up the standard of the Mackenzies, the "Cabar Feidh." Offered no quarter by the Gordon cavalry, Ruairidh Mac Gille Fhinnein, chief of his name, and his clansmen, together with some MacRaes and Mathesons, were all cut down.

As with most of Montrose's victories, many of the casualties were inflicted after the Covenanter army broke and fled, in a merciless pursuit which was continued for 14 miles (23 km).

== Aftermath ==
Montrose had destroyed half the Covenanter forces arrayed against him. Urry later turned his coat once again and joined Montrose. Over the next three months, Baillie and Montrose faced off twice, first at the Battle of Alford and then the Battle of Kilsyth, the largest battle of the conflict in Scotland.

A pub/restaurant, previously named "The Covenanter" and now the "1645" in commemoration of the battle, stands on part of the old battlefield at the end of Auldearn.

The battle and the Royalist campaign of 1644–1645 in general feature in the 1937 novel And No Quarter by Irish writer Maurice Walsh, told from the perspective of two members of O'Cahan's Regiment.

== General references ==
- Buchan, J. Montrose, 1938.
- Cowan, E. J., Montrose. For Covenant and King, 1995.
- MacDonald, John, Orian Iain Lom. Songs of John MacDonald, Bard of Keppoch, ed. and trans. A. M. Mackenzie, 1964.
- Macleod, R. H., The Battle of Auldearn, 9 May 1645, in The Seventeenth Century in the Highlands, Inverness Field Club, 1986 ISBN 978-0-9502612-5-6.
- O'Danachair, C. O., Montrose's Irish Regiments, in Irish Sword, 1959–60.
- Reid, S., The Campaigns of Montrose, 1990.
- Ruthven, Patrick Gordon of, A Short Abridgement of Britane's Distemper, 1844.
- Stevenson, D., Alasdair MacColla and the Highland Problem in the Seventeenth Century, 1980.
- Wishart, George, The Memoirs of James Marquis of Montrose, trans. A. D. Murdoch and H. F. Moorland-Simpson, 1893.
