= Alasdair Mac Colla =

Scottish military officer (c.1610–1647)

Sir Alasdair Mac Colla Chiotaich MacDhòmhnaill
- Born: c. 1610; Colonsay, Hebrides, Scotland
- Died: 1647 (aged 36–37); Battle of Knocknanuss, County Cork, Ireland
- Burial place: Clonmeen, County Cork, Ireland
- Other name: Sir Alexander MacDonald
- Spouse: Elizabeth MacAlister
- Relatives: Coll Ciotach (father)
- Military career
- Allegiance: Irish Government (1641–1642); Irish Confederates (1642–1647); Scottish Royalists (1644–1646)
- Service years: 1641–1647
- Rank: Major general
- Nickname: Fear thollaidh nan tighean ("The destroyer of houses")
- Conflicts: Wars of the Three Kingdoms: Battle of Glenmaquin; Battle of Tippermuir; Battle of Aberdeen (1644); Battle of Inverlochy (1645); Battle of Auldearn; Battle of Kilsyth; Battle of Rhunahaorine Moss; Battle of Dunaverty; Battle of Knocknanuss †

Sir Alasdair Mac Colla Chiotaich MacDhòmhnaill (c. 1610 – 13 November 1647), also known by the English variant of his name Sir Alexander MacDonald, was a military officer best known for his participation in the Wars of the Three Kingdoms, notably the Irish Confederate Wars and Montrose's Royalist campaign in Scotland during 1644–45. A member of the Gaelic gentry of the Clan MacDonald of Dunnyveg, a branch of the Clan Donald active in the Hebrides and Ireland, Mac Colla is particularly notable for the very large number of oral traditions and legends which his life inspired in the Highlands.

During Montrose's campaign of 1644–45, in which the Royalist army won a series of remarkable victories, Mac Colla was given a knighthood. He died in 1647 in Ireland at the Battle of Knocknanuss.

== Name ==
His full name can be translated from Scottish Gaelic as 'Alexander the son of Coll the Left-Handed MacDonald'. Gaelic-speakers, preferring the patronymic system, generally referred to him as Alasdair MacColla; English-speakers generally used the form Alexander MacDonald or MacColl. Mac Colla himself would have used both English and Gaelic forms: the three surviving examples of his signature, all in English language documents, use "Allexander Macdonell".

English-speaking writers of the past, not understanding the Gaelic patronymic and sloinneadh (genealogical descent) systems, often referred to him as "Collkitto", an anglicised spelling of Coll Ciotach, a nickname properly belonging to his father, Coll Macdonald. Ciotach, "left-handed", can also mean "devious" in Gaelic.

== Biography ==
=== Early life ===
Mac Colla was born on the Inner Hebridean Isle of Colonsay in the early seventeenth century. His early life encompassed both Gaelic Ireland and the Gaelic western Highlands of Scotland.

His father Coll, the Laird of Colonsay, was a descendant of the 5th chief of Clan Donald South, or MacDonald of Dunnyveg. This branch of the Clan Donald had historically claimed ownership of land both in the western Scottish islands and, following the 1399 marriage of Irish heiress Margery Byset into the family, in County Antrim, north-eastern Ireland. According to some traditions Alasdair's mother Mary was a daughter of Campbell of Auchinbreck, but has also been suggested to be one of the O'Cahans of Dunseverick, a daughter of Macdonald of Sanda, a daughter of Macneil of Barra, or a daughter of Ranald MacDonald of Smerby, the latter being the tradition favoured on Colonsay itself.

Mac Colla was born into a period in which the Clan Donald's regional power and influence had waned. This was due partly to the incorporation of the Lordship of the Isles by the Scottish crown and the growing regional influence of the chiefs of the rival Clan Campbell.

Mac Colla's career would, despite the larger context of the Scottish and Irish wars, become defined by an effort to counter Campbell expansionism, and particularly to recover Islay and other lost MacDonald possessions.

At a time when much of Scotland was Calvinist and Presbyterian, many of the MacDonalds remained Roman Catholic, particularly due to the efforts of missionaries from the Order of Friars Minor. Mac Colla's father is sometimes described as an enthusiastic Catholic convert from Protestantism, though he appears to have embraced the faith long before the first missionaries arrived in 1623.

=== Civil War in Ireland and Scotland ===
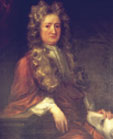
Randal Macdonnell, 1st Marquess of Antrim. Antrim was a kinsman of the Macdonalds of Dunnyveg, and much of Mac Colla's career would be in the service of his interests in Scotland and Ireland.

Mac Colla's military career was prompted by the onset of the long and interlinked series of conflicts known as the Wars of the Three Kingdoms, in which several heads of the Scottish and Irish branches of Clan Donald gave support to the Royalists and to Confederate Ireland. Their main rival for regional power, the Campbell chief Archibald Campbell, 1st Marquess of Argyll, was a key supporter of the Scottish government, then controlled by the Presbyterian party known as the Covenanters.

At the outbreak of the Irish Rebellion of 1641, Mac Colla was in Ulster, where his kinsman the 1st Marquess of Antrim held large estates in the Glens. Antrim had taken an interest in the growing crisis in Scottish politics, sensing a potential opportunity to recover his family's traditional lands in Scotland. He initially took a neutral position in the Irish rebellion; he raised a mixed Protestant and Catholic force to protect settlers against the rebels, engaging his relative Mac Colla to serve as an officer.

As religious tensions grew, a group of Antrim's Catholic officers, including Mac Colla claimed there was a Protestant plot to massacre them. In January 1642 they defected to Felim O'Neill's rebel forces after killing 60-90 Protestant colleagues while they slept in what became known as the "Portna Massacre". Present at several actions in eastern Ulster including the Siege of Coleraine, Mac Colla was wounded at Glenmaquin in June 1642: later that year he left the rebels and sought terms with the Scottish general Alexander Leslie, 1st Earl of Leven.

Although he subsequently rejoined the Irish Confederates, Mac Colla appears not to have been given another military command until late 1643, when he returned to the Hebrides as part of an expeditionary force against the Scottish government, by this point in alliance with the English Parliament. It was reported that Mac Colla had landed with 300 men, and that his brother Ranald was following with reinforcements. Argyll eventually dispatched a force of 600 under James Campbell of Ardkinglas to dislodge them, and Mac Colla's rebels were driven back to Ireland; a small garrison remaining on Rathlin Island was defeated in June 1644.

=== The campaign in Scotland, 1644–45 ===
In 1644, Antrim recommended Mac Colla to the Supreme Council of Confederate Ireland to lead an expedition to the mainland of Scotland to aid the Royalist forces there. He was given three regiments, comprising around 1600 largely Irish soldiers. Some appear to have been Ulstermen recruited from the Marquess of Antrim's estates, though many of the Irish were (according to the chronicler John Spalding of Aberdeen) "expert soldiers" who were recruited from Spanish service in West Flanders, and one company (Sgt-Major Ledwytch's) appears to have been a unit of English-descended Palesmen. Alongside the Irish, three companies of Hebridean Scots were constituted as Mac Colla's personal lifeguard. Spalding noted that Mac Colla's men wore a coat and trews and wore a twist of oats pinned to their bonnets and caps as a badge.

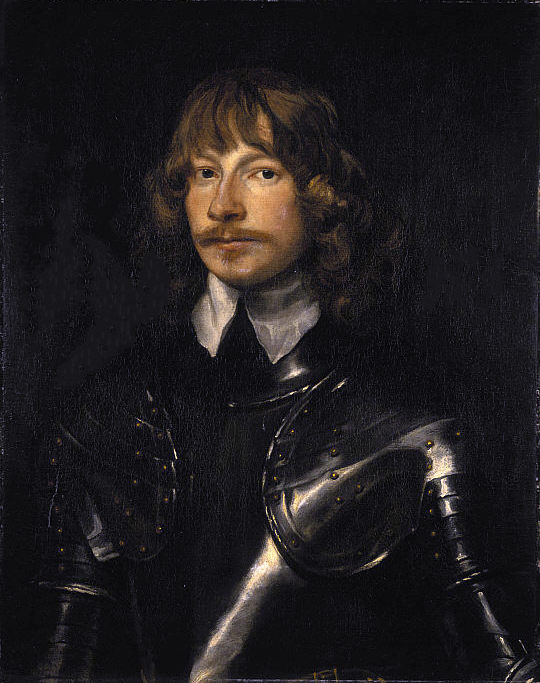
The Marquess of Montrose, alongside whom Mac Colla fought in 1644–45 against the forces of the Parliament of Scotland.

Mac Colla's force landed in the Ardnamurchan peninsula in July 1644, attacking Mingarry Castle. It initially fought its way through Argyll, raiding Campbell properties: by August, Mac Colla was finally able to link up with the King's Lieutenant, James Graham, 1st Marquess of Montrose. The support of Montrose raised the standing of Mac Colla amongst the Highlanders, who looked down on him both as an island outsider and as a landless member of the gentry, rather than the ancient nobility they were accustomed to follow. Mac Colla had been able to raise a further 1500 soldiers from among his Clan Donald kinsmen, such as Clan MacDonald of Keppoch, Glengarry and Sleat: the Royal commission enabled him to raise additional recruits including a group of men under Donald Robertson, the Tutor of Struan.

In the following campaign, Mac Colla and Montrose won a series of dramatic victories, often against larger, but frequently inexperienced Covenanter reserves in Scotland. Most of the experienced Covenanter troops, many of them having fought as professional soldiers for the 'Lion of the North', Gustavus Adolphus of Sweden in the Thirty Years' War or in the Dutch Republic's famous Scots Brigade, were with the main Covenanter force fighting alongside English Parliamentarians and contributing to many Royalist defeats in England. By contrast, the Covenanter troops left behind in Scotland were mainly militia. Nevertheless, MacColla, Montrose and co.'s list of victories remains impressive. They won at Tippermuir, Aberdeen, Inverlochy, Auldearn, Alford and Kilsyth. While traditional historiography tended to emphasise Montrose's tactical genius, some more recent studies, notably the work of Prof. D. Stevenson, give Mac Colla a substantial share of credit for some of the victories.

Oral history and Gaelic-language poetry also gave Mac Colla a central role in events, and preserved stories such as his beheading of the opposing commanderSir Duncan Campbell of Auchinbreck at Inverlochy. After Kilsyth, Montrose, acting on the orders of King Charles, conferred knighthood on Mac Colla and raised him to the rank of Major-General.

For much of the campaign Mac Colla's men supported themselves by pillaging Campbell lands, burning of houses and barns and carrying off livestock. Their actions during the winter of 1644–45 earned Mac Colla the byname fear thollaidh nan tighean, the "destroyer [lit: piercer] of houses" amongst the Argyll peasantry. An account of the campaign sent to Dublin, possibly written by Mac Colla himself or by one of his colonels James Macdonnell, stated that "throughout all Argyle, we left neither house nor hold unburned, nor corn nor cattle that belonged to the whole name of Campbell".

For a time much of Scotland was in fear of his progress, with one contemporary observer writing: "There is nothing heard now up and down the kingdom but alarms and rumores, randevouses of clans [...] Montross and MacKoll in every manes mouth, nay the very children frightened". Whilst the military contribution of the Irish troops and Highlanders to the Royalist campaign was undeniable, it is arguable that the aftermath of several of their actions, particularly the three-day plunder of Aberdeen by the victorious troops, seriously harmed the Royalist cause, and it is likely that at least some accounts of Mac Colla's depredations were Parliamentarian propaganda.

=== In the Highlands, 1645–1647 ===
Mac Colla and Montrose ultimately parted company as Mac Colla's priorities, focused on regaining Macdonald possessions from the Campbells, lay in the western Highlands, whereas Montrose wanted to secure the Scottish Lowlands for the King. As a result, both were defeated separately by the Covenanters. Those of the Irish troops who had stayed with Montrose under Colonel Manus O'Cahan were massacred, after being promised quarter, subsequent to the Battle of Philiphaugh in September 1645, and after a brief guerrilla campaign Montrose was ordered to lay down his arms by King Charles.

Mac Colla, with the remaining Irish and clansmen, ignored Charles's orders and continued the conflict in the western Highlands, allegedly refusing cooperation with a remaining Royalist force under George Gordon, 2nd Marquess of Huntly, who still held out in the north. He went on to win a further victory against the Campbells at Lagganmore, following which he was said to have burned down a building full of Campbell women and children that was henceforth known as Sabhal nan Cnamh, the "Barn of Bones". The campaign petered out in a series of sieges of castles in Kintyre, and Mac Colla was eventually defeated at the Battle of Rhunahaorine Moss in May 1647, escaping with most of his troops to the Isle of Gigha and then to Islay. Leaving small garrisons of Highlanders at Dunaverty and at Dunyvaig on Islay, the latter under his father Coll, he then returned to Antrim along with most of his men. His brother Archibald (Gilleasbuig) was killed at the Siege of Skipness Castle in August 1646.

=== Influence on military tactics ===
Mac Colla has been credited with inventing or refining the tactic of the Highland charge, which came to be a feature of several battles of the following century. In an attack, his men ran at enemy infantry, stopped to fire a coordinated volley from their muskets at close range, and then threw down their firearms and closed hand to hand at speed. This proved remarkably successful in both Ireland and Scotland due to the musket's slow reloading time, the effectiveness of a single mass volley against the usual "rolling fire" of contemporary musket drill, and the poor discipline and training of many of the troops Mac Colla's men faced. Usually, the Covenanter infantry broke, ran, and were cut down when facing a coordinated charge by Montrose and Mac Colla's soldiers. Stevenson has suggested that Mac Colla first introduced the tactic from Ireland, refining it with the addition of a musket volley at a range of 25–55 metres, after which his men would advance obscured by the dense smoke from their own firearms.

Past historiography often presented the charge as a direct descendant of an older Gaelic mode of warfare, which relied on shock attacks by an elite of heavily armed troops to break an enemy's line. However, despite the popular image of Mac Colla's troops being equipped and fighting in a purely 'Highland' fashion, the majority of men in his Irish regiments, at least, were experienced veterans of the Spanish Army of Flanders and equipped conventionally with pike and musket. It has even been suggested that rather than being a development of a traditional 'Gaelic' or Highland tactic, the charge could have been inspired by similar Swedish musket tactics of the Thirty Years War, a conflict some of Mac Colla's veterans would have known, or could have simply been an energetic version of a standard 17th century practice of "falling-on" after discharging weapons.

It appears that not all observers were impressed with Mac Colla's military skill: the Scottish professional soldier Sir James Turner, another veteran of the Thirty Years War, judged him to be "nae soljer, tho stout enough", and accused him of being "excessivelie besotted with brandie and aquavitae".

=== Defeat and death ===
Mac Colla's father Coll Ciotach, who was again taken prisoner at Dunyvaig, was killed in retaliation for his son's atrocities in the Campbell country. Mac Colla himself rejoined the Irish Confederates: he initially made plans to lead his veteran troops to Spain into the service of Philip IV, though in the event nothing came of the proposal. He also made an attempt to join the Ulster army of Owen Roe O'Neill, but was forbidden from doing so by the Marquess of Antrim, who was by then on bad terms with O'Neill.

Mac Colla's troops, (both Irish survivors of the 1644 expedition and "redshanks", or Scottish Highlanders) were split up and assigned to the Leinster and Munster armies: Mac Colla was attached to the latter with the rank of Lieutenant-General. He was initially appointed governor of Clonmel, mounting a successful defence of the town. Mac Colla's men were, however, mostly killed in the Confederate defeats at the Battle of Dungan's Hill in County Meath and then at the battle of Cnoc na nOs (Knocknanuss, "Hill of the Deer") in County Cork, where Alasdair commanded the right wing, under the overall command of Viscount Taaffe against Lord Inchquin's Parliamentarian army. Mac Colla lead the right wing in a completely successful highland charge, routing Inchquin's best infantry before overrunning the enemy artillery and then pillaging Inchquin's baggage train. Unbeknown to Mac Colla, however, the rest of Viscount Taafe's army had been routed, leading Mac Colla's men to be repeatedly attacked by cavalry charges before Mac Colla had had time to reform his ranks. Completely surrounded by enemy forces, in the course of the following fighting most of Alasdair's men were killed, whereupon, according to several sources, he surrendered upon the promise of quarter. The promise was broken, however, by a certain Major Nicholas Purdon, who shot Mac Colla in cold blood after he had been taken prisoner. His death was much lamented by many in Ireland and Scotland, with Cardinal Rinuccini bitterly deploring his abandonment by the rest of Viscount Taafe's army and comparing his death in battle for faith and country to that of Judas Maccabeus. Several laments were composed in honour of Mac Colla, praising his bravery and strength, including one by Iain Lom. A ford on the River Awbeg in Rathmaher townland, still known in the 19th century as the "Chieftain's Ford", was said locally to be the place of his death.

Mac Colla was buried in the now ruined church of Clonmeen, County Cork, near the village of Banteer, in one of the tombs of the O'Callaghan family, then of Clonmeen Castle and later of Clonmeen Lodge. The family's head Donough O'Callahan was at the time a member of the Council of the Irish Confederacy. The vault is supposed to be under the church's north wall, against which a monument was placed in 2011 by a local historical society. His famous long sword, which was said to be unusual in both size and design, was still to be seen at nearby Lohort Castle as late as the early 1800s, but has since disappeared.

== Family ==
He married Elizabeth MacAlister, daughter of Hector MacAlister and Margaret Campbell; they had three sons:

- Coll, who married Anne Magee, died on 25 March 1719
- Gill'Easbuig Mór, who married Anne Steward, died in 1720
- A third son, about whom little has been recorded

After Alasdair's death the family settled at Kilmore House, Glenariffe, in County Antrim. Four generations later Alasdair's great-great-grandson James McDonnell (1763–1845), sometimes known as the "father of Belfast medicine", founded the Medical School now located in Queens University, as well as establishing a hospital that at a later stage became the Royal Victoria Hospital. A later descendant of the family is the SDLP politician Alasdair McDonnell.

== Commemoration ==
After his death, Mac Colla became a figure of minor folklore in Gaelic Ireland and Scotland, with songs and melodies written in his honour in both countries, and many stories entering the oral tradition of the western Highlands and Hebrides, particularly in districts inhabited by the MacDonalds. These stories depicted him as an immensely strong man, 7 feet tall, of conspicuous bravery and swordsmanship. Rather than as a historic source, the tales are best regarded as an Early Modern equivalent of the heroic cycles of earlier Gaelic tradition. Of those stories that can be related to historical events, most appear to refer to events during the 1646 campaign in Kintyre.

Even less dramatic contemporary descriptions give Mac Colla's height as over 6 feet, with a targe "as big as a door" (though this may be a misunderstanding of the bardic phrase "door of battle" meaning a shield or targe, a metaphor for their plied wood construction).

Mac Colla appears in And No Quarter, a 1937 novel by Irish author Maurice Walsh, which covers the Royalist campaign in Scotland of 1644–1645, told from the perspective of two members of O'Cahan's regiment.

He is commemorated in the Scottish Gaelic poetry of Iain Lom and Dorothy Brown (Diorbhail Nic a' Bhriuthainn). Ian Lom in particular, as a Macdonald of Keppoch, was concerned to frame Mac Colla's victories as part of a specifically Gaelic military effort against the traditional enemies of Clan Donald, ignoring the wider Civil War context and the contribution of Montrose.

In Ireland he was remembered by a piece of traditional music from or near the period named “Marsial Alasdair” (aka “Alasdair's March" or ”MacAlasdrum's March" and several other names in various spellings), supposed variously to be the tune played by Alasdair's pipers en route to the battle, and / or as the march played to his grave afterwards. It appears to be related to the style of Gaelic art music now known as "piobaireachd" (piping) or more correctly as "ceol mor" (big music). There are a number of interesting variations, including a jig.

Another tune associated with him is "Bas Alasdair" (Death of Alasdair), a majestic and moving harp dirge of the ancient style of Gaelic "high art" harping that was soon to be lost.

This was recorded and annotated by at least the 18th century, and a version occurs in one of Captain Francis O'Neill's books ("Irish Folk Music, A Fascinating Hobby") Ann Heymann, the harpist and folklorist, has recorded a set consisting of the air “Bas Alasdair” and “Marsial Alasadair” that dates from the mid seventeenth century and is still performed.

=== Alasdair Mac Colla ===
Another song which praises the deeds of Alasdair and date from the period is a Scottish Gaelic waulking song "Alasdair Mhic Colla Ghasda" ("Alasdair, son of gallant Coll").

This song may have originally been taken from a bardic brosnachadh (battle incitement) or praise poem, judging from certain bardic qualities seen in it, such as the ceangal (tying or binding) wherein the last line of a verse becomes the first line of the next.

The song has been recorded numerous times, and appears on the following albums:

- 1988 - Capercaillie - The Blood Is Strong
- 1996 - Clannad - Lore
- 2002 - Aneka - The Power of Scotland
- 2005 - Moya Brennan - Óró – A Live Session
- 2007 - Anne Lorne Gillies - O Mo Dhùthaich / Oh My Land
- 2008 - Éamonn Doorley, Muireann Nic Amhlaoibh, Julie Fowlis and Ross Martin - Dual
- 2008 - Moya Brennan - Heart Strings

=== Gol na mBan san Ár ===
"Gol na mBan san Ár" ("Lament of the Women in the Massacre") was composed in memory of MacColla and his female followers. The song has been recorded under many names.

- 1957 - Séamus Ennis - The Bonny Bunch of Roses
- 1980 - The Chieftains - Boil the Breakfast Early
- 1993 - Noel Hill, Tony MacMahon and Iarla Ó Lionáird - Aislingí Ceoil (Music Of Dreams)
- 2008 - Éamonn Doorley, Muireann Nic Amhlaoibh, Julie Fowlis and Ross Martin - Dual
