= Irish Confederate expedition to Scotland =

Standard of the Irish Brigade.

The Irish Confederate expedition to Scotland took place in 1644–1645 during the Wars of the Three Kingdoms. A force of about 2,000 Irish Confederate troops, under the command of Alasdair Mac Colla, sailed to Scotland in June 1644, where they joined with Royalist forces fighting Montrose's Highland campaign against the Covenanters. The expedition was the result of an effort by King Charles I to enlist help from Irish Catholics in fighting Parliamentarian forces.

== Troop request ==
In September 1643, a truce was made between James Butler, Marquis of Ormonde, who was leader of the Royalist regime based in Dublin, Ireland, and the Confederate Catholics of Ireland. The truce permitted Butler to send Royalist forces previously engaged against the Irish Confederates in Ireland to fight for King Charles I in Britain, while allowing the Confederate Catholics to concentrate their forces against the Scots and Parliamentarian forces in Ireland.

King Charles also hoped for additional troops from the Confederate Catholics of Ireland that he could use in the British theatres of the war. However, he could not be seen to be directly in league with the Irish Catholics since associating with them would alienate many of his British supporters. He decided to negotiate through Randal MacDonnell, Earl of Antrim, who was loyal to him but also held the rank of Lieutenant General of the Confederate Catholic armies. The plan was for MacDonnell to lobby the Confederate Supreme Council based in Kilkenny, Ireland, to allow him to send 2,000 Irish troops to Scotland and 10,000 troops to England.

== Troops are assembled ==
In February 1644, MacDonnell was in Kilkenny where the Confederate Council agreed to arm and equip 2,000 men and transport them to Scotland, but the council refused to send men to England. The Scottish expedition was beneficial to the Confederate Council, in that it would draw the Scots army away from Ulster, which was, at that time, the biggest threat to southern Ireland. At the very least it would keep the Scots army close to the ports, which would prevent them campaigning in southern and western Ireland. Another factor that the Confederates likely took into account was that many of the Ulster Irish disapproved of the Confederate-Ormond truce as their lands were still under occupation by the Scots army in Ulster. Some of these men wished to continue fighting the Scots but did not wish to join Owen Roe O’Neill's Ulster confederate army as they were traditional enemies of his faction of the O'Neills. Also some who followed Randall MacDonnell wished to use the expedition to further the claims of their clan relatives in Scotland and attack their traditional enemies the Campbells.

== Ships of the expedition ==
The expedition sailed in late June 1644, from the Port of Passage in County Waterford in three ships—The Christopher, The Angell Gabriel, and The Jacob of Ross—arranged by Kilkenny merchant Patrick Archer. These ships were protected by The Harp, a frigate which sailed out of Wexford.

== List of officers in the expedition ==
A list of the officers and the numbers of soldiers exists in the Ormonde manuscripts in the National Library of Ireland. The names are mostly those of Ulster Gaels who would have come from what is now North Londonderry and Antrim, which were areas under Scottish occupation at the time. There are also some Leinster names, such as Ledwitch, Deasy and Newgent, and also some names of likely Scottish exiles from the Highlands.

There are three regiments documented, which were commanded by Colonel James MacDermott (500 men), Colonel Manus O'Cahan (500 men), and Lieftenant-Generall Mac Donnell (1,030 men) who was most likely Randal MacDonnell's brother, Alexander. However, it seems likely that he did not actually travel there, as there is a statement in the Commentarius Rinnucianianus that a "Thomas O'Lachnanus" commanded a regiment in the name of Alexander MacDonnell. This is likely the "Sarjeant Major Thomas Laghtnan" listed by MacDonnell. Overall command was given to Major General Alasdair MacColla MacDonald.

== Arrival in Scotland ==
On 6 July the expedition captured two English ships off Duart in the Isle of Mull, which "were laden with wheat, rye and sack", and on 7 July Colonel O'Cahan landed with 400 men in Morvern, followed on 8 July by MacDonald, who landed the rest of the army on Ardnamurchan. According to Leith's Memoirs of Scottish Catholics: "gradually the rumour everywhere spread that a cruel, savage and foreign enemy had invaded the country".

After marching inland and linking with the Scottish Royalist leader, the Marquis of Montrose, this small army participated in a year of unbroken Royalist victories in Scotland, and fought in six major battles: Tippermuir, Aberdeen, Inverlochy, Auldhern, Alford and Kilsyth.

== Sources ==
- Lenihan, Padraig (2001). Confederate Catholics at War 1641–1649. Studies in Irish History. ISBN 978-1-85918-2-444.
- Stevenson, David (1981). Scottish Covenanters and Irish Confederates. ISBN 978-1-90368-8-472.
- Stevenson, David (2003). Highland Warrior: Alasdair MacColla and the Civil Wars. John Donald. ISBN 978-0-85976-5-633.
