= William Baillie (soldier) =

Scottish general

General Sir William Baillie
- Born: c. 1595
- Died: 1653
- Children: James Baillie, son; William Baillie, son
- Relatives: Sir William Baillie of Lamington, father; Mrs Home, mother

General William Baillie (c. 1595–1653) was a Scottish professional soldier who fought for the Dutch and later commanded a regiment under Gustavus Adolphus in Sweden. Previously having seen service in the Scots-Dutch brigade, he joined the Scottish regiment of Colonel Alexander Hamilton in Sweden before going on to command a German regiment. Records of his service in the Swedish army fade out after 1633. He returned to Scotland in 1639. He served with the Army of the Covenant in 1639 at Duns Law with the rank of colonel.

== Early life ==
Baillie was the illegitimate son of Sir William Baillie of Lamington in Lanarkshire and of a "Mrs. Home", a daughter of Alexander Home of North Berwick, Provost of Edinburgh. At the time of Baillie's birth, his father was married to Margaret Maxwell, Countess of Angus, the widow of Archibald Douglas, 6th Count of Angus. After the Countess of Angus's death, Baillie's father married Mrs. Home in an unsuccessful attempt to legitimize Baillie's birth.

== Military career ==
William Baillie was a Scottish officer who served as the lieutenant colonel of Alexander Hamilton's regiment from early in 1629 to June 1630, when Hamilton's regiment merged with another regiment led by Sir John Meldrum.

In 1644, Baillie marched into England with the Army of the Covenant. He commanded part of the Scottish infantry at the Battle of Marston Moor, overall command of which fell to Alexander Leslie. In 1645, he commanded the detachment sent from Alexander Leslie, 1st Earl of Leven's army against James Graham, 1st Marquess of Montrose. On his arrival in Scotland, Baillie successfully manoeuvred to prevent Montrose from marching south. In April, he almost caught up with Montrose at Dundee but Montrose succeeded in escaping into the Highlands. Baillie then split his forces, planning to trap Montrose between his own troops and a detachment commanded by Sir John Hurry. However, Montrose decisively defeated Hurry at the Battle of Auldearn in May 1645; two months later he defeated Baillie himself at the Battle of Alford. After this defeat, Baillie tendered his resignation. This was rejected by the Covenanter leaders. Instead a new army was raised. Baillie retained command but was now accompanied by a Committee of War headed by the Earl of Argyll. Against Baillie's advice, a battle with Montrose was forced at the Battle of Kilsyth. Once again, he was defeated - his final involvement against Montrose who was in turn defeated at the Battle of Philiphaugh on 13 September.

During the Second Civil War, Baillie commanded the infantry in the Duke of Hamilton's ill-fated Engager invasion of England. The Engagers were defeated by Oliver Cromwell at the Battle of Preston in August 1648. While Hamilton escaped, Baillie was ordered to surrender with his infantry.

== Later life and death ==
Baillie died in 1653.
