= Battle of Inverlochy (1645) =

Part of the Wars of the Three Kingdoms

Coordinates: 56.831°N 5.079°W

- Part of the Scottish Civil War
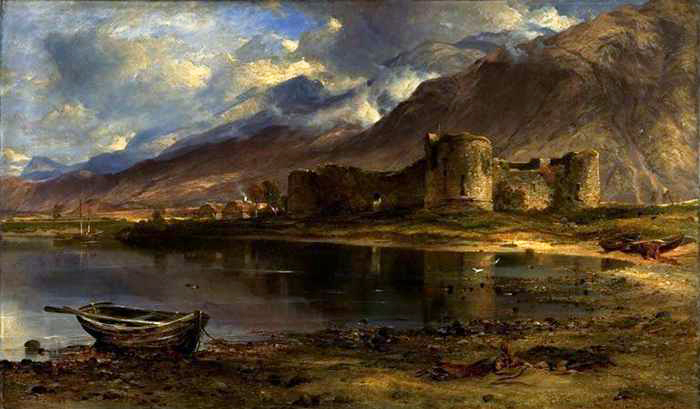
- Inverlochy Castle; Ben Nevis in the background
| Date | 2 February 1645 |
| Location | Inverlochy |
| Result | Royalist/Irish victory |

Belligerents
| Royalists; Irish Brigade | Covenanters |

Commanders and leaders
| Lord Montrose; Sir Alasdair MacColla; Sir Thomas Ogilvie † | Lord Auchinbreck † |

Strength
| 1,500 | 2,000–3,500 |

Casualties and losses
| Few | 1,500 |

Registered battlefield
- Official name: Battle of Inverlochy II
- Designated: 30 November 2011
- Reference no.: BTL24

Locations in Scotland

The Battle of Inverlochy occurred on 2 February 1645, during the Wars of the Three Kingdoms, when a Royalist force of Highlanders and Confederate Irish troops under the overall command of James Graham, 1st Marquess of Montrose, routed and largely destroyed the pursuing forces of Archibald Campbell, 1st Marquess of Argyll, who had been encamped under the walls of Inverlochy Castle.

After being researched, the area was designated as a battlefield by Historic Scotland in 2011.

== Background ==
After the Covenanter-controlled Scottish Committee of Estates decided to intervene in the English Civil War on the Parliamentarian side, the Royalist party sought to find ways of tying down Covenanter forces in Scotland to prevent them being employed in England. King Charles I had already given a commission to Montrose, a disaffected former signatory of the Covenant, to organise Royalist opposition in Scotland. The project was given impetus when Confederate Ireland, at the instigation of the Earl of Antrim and the Duke of Ormond, aided the Royalists by sending 2,000 experienced troops to Scotland under Antrim's relative Alasdair Mac Colla. The Irish landed at Ardnamurchan on the west coast in early July 1644.

Montrose and a small number of Royalist clansmen linked up with Mac Colla in August. By this time the Committee of Estates had sent armies into the field against them, under the overall command of the experienced general William Baillie. Montrose, however, won surprise victories against government troops at Tippermuir and Aberdeen in September. He then retreated into the Highlands, pursued by a force under the Marquess of Argyll, the head of Clan Campbell and one of the key figures in the Committee of Estates, while Baillie's main army blocked Montrose's path eastward. By late November, the Royalists had added another 1,000 recruits, largely from amongst the men of Clan Donald. Over the winter they conducted a fierce campaign of burning and plundering largely directed against the lands of Argyll himself, and culminating in the sacking of Inveraray. Montrose left Inveraray on 14 January 1645 and headed north. It is believed that he split his army at Glen Etive sending part of it up past Ballachulish while the bulk continued across Rannoch Moor, into Glencoe.

Baillie and Argyll believed that Montrose's force would easily be trapped or dispersed once the difficulty of supplying them in the Highlands in winter took hold. Indeed, by the end of January, Montrose had halted at Kilchummin in the Great Glen, with supplies exhausted and with his forces reduced to less than 2,000 due to sickness and desertions amongst the Highlanders, who were eager to return home with their plunder. At Kilchummin he learned that a large contingent of Northern Levies under the Earl of Seaforth blocked the route northward at Inverness, while Argyll – with a force made up of his own regiment, eight companies of Lowland foot sent by Baillie, and a large number of Clan Campbell levies – was camped to the south of him at Inverlochy. Further south, Baillie and Sir John Urry were assembling further troops. The Royalists were now effectively trapped.

== Flank march ==
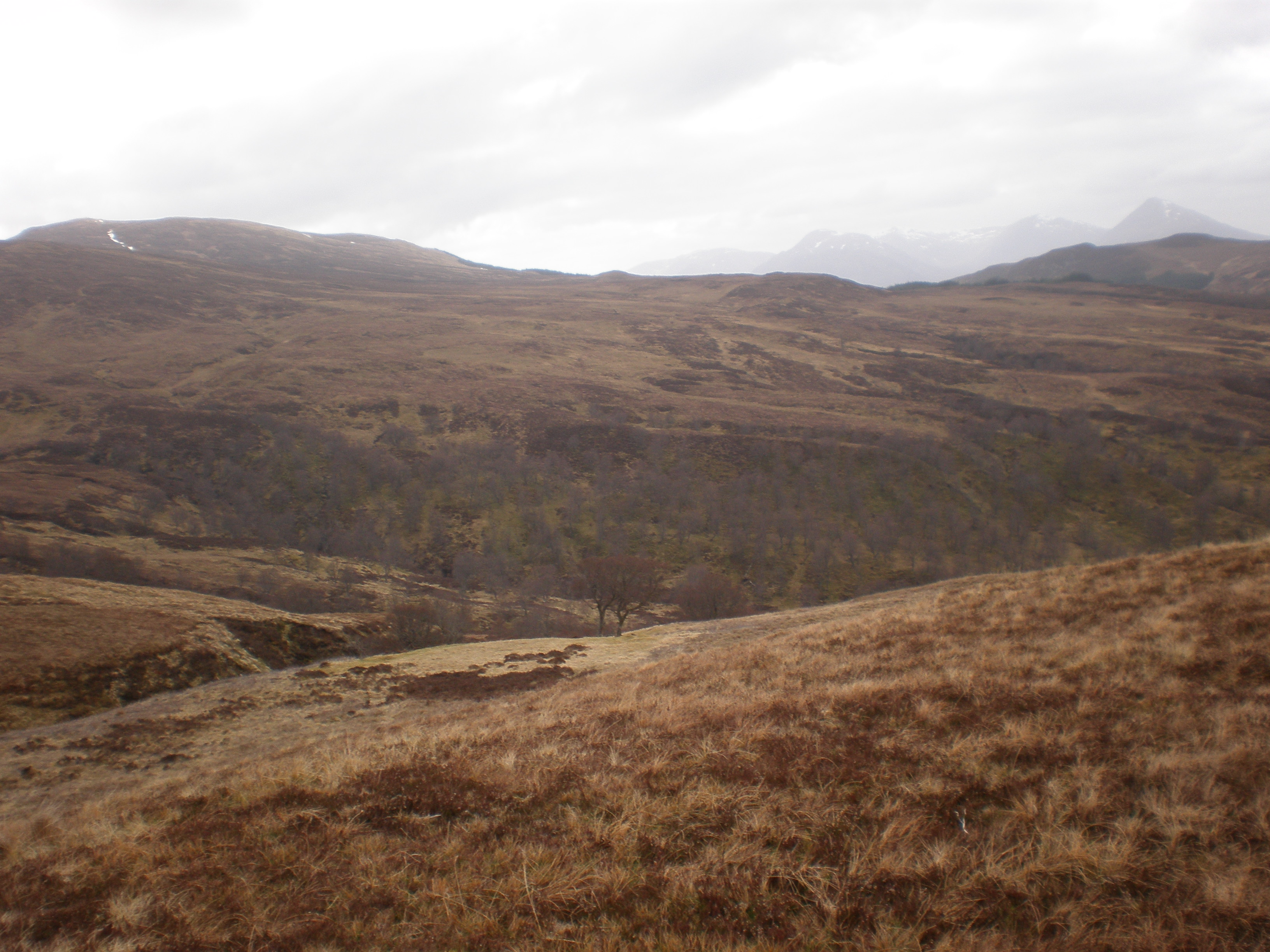
The watercourse leading from Glen Buck to the hill of Carn na Larach. Montrose's men passed over this terrain, in winter, on the way to Inverlochy.

Montrose decided to face the threat by marching south and attacking Argyll. This course may have been chosen as Argyll's men now threatened the lands of several of Montrose's key supporters. However, he realised that a frontal approach would be quickly detected. What followed was a remarkable flanking march, during winter, across some of the toughest and wildest terrain in the British Isles, partly through snow knee-deep. The Royalists first travelled up the River Tarff to Glen Buck via Culachy, and across the gorge of the Calder Burn to reach the head of the glen, 1000 feet above sea level. They then climbed a further 1000 feet to Carn na Larach, before travelling down Glen Turret and Glen Roy to Keppoch, where the advance guard rested for around three hours in a barn while the main force caught up.

After fording the Spean, and passing through Leanachan Woods, they emerged on the slopes of Ben Nevis above Inverlochy in the early hours of Candlemas Day, 2 February; they had marched around 36 miles in 36 hours.

== Battle ==
Montrose's army spent a cold night in the open on the side of Ben Nevis. Argyll was already aware that a small force was operating in the area, having been alerted by pickets driven from Keppoch by the Royalist advance guard. He did not know, however, that he was faced by the entire royal army. Just before dawn on 2 February 1645, Argyll and his commanders were dismayed at the sight that lay before them. As far as they were aware Montrose should still have been 30 miles north.

=== Order of Battle and deployments ===
- Royalist (James Graham, 1st Marquess of Montrose)
  - Irish Brigade Alasdair Mac Colla
    - Thomas Laghtnan's Regiment (400 men)
    - Manus O'Cahan's Regiment (200)
    - James McDonnell's Regiment (200)
  - MacDonald, Cameron and other clan levies (c.500)
  - Patrick Graham of Inchbrackie's Regiment (200)
  - Sir Thomas Ogilvie's Horse (50)
- Covenanter (Sir Duncan Campbell, 2nd Baronet of Auchinbreck)
  - Marquess of Argyll's Regiment (500)
  - Clan Campbell levies (c.1000)
  - Lt-Col Laghlan Roughe's Battalion (200)
  - Lt-Col John Cockburn's Battalion (200)

Argyll did not stay for the battle, having injured his arm in a fall from his horse, and retired to his galley anchored on Loch Linnhe. Command of the government forces was left in the hands of his kinsman Sir Duncan Campbell of Auchinbreck, described by Robert Baillie as "a stout soldier, but a very vicious man". Auchinbreck was an experienced veteran recently recalled from the war in Ireland and regarded as the best soldier in Clan Campbell.

Auchinbreck lined up his forces with the left wing anchored on Inverlochy Castle, which he reinforced with 200 musketeers to protect his left flank. In the centre he placed Argyll's regiment, with an advance guard commanded by Gillespie, son of the Laird of Bingingeahds. On the flanks he put the 8 companies of Lowland militia sent by Baillie, under Roughe and Cockburn, while to the rear was a reserve of Campbell clan levies commanded by the lairds of Lochnell and Rarra, along with two light artillery pieces. Unlike at Tippermuir and Aberdeen, where Montrose had annihilated hastily conscripted and poorly trained militias, many of the troops he faced at Inverlochy were veterans of the wars in England and Ireland. Montrose lined his army up only two lines deep to avoid being outflanked, placing the clansmen, under his personal command, in the centre with the Irish on the flanks, the left being commanded by MacColla and the right by O'Cahan. A small troop of light cavalry, led by Sir Thomas Ogilvie of Airlie, protected the Royalist standard.

=== Attack by Montrose ===
The fight did not start straight away and instead skirmishes broke out along the line before dawn. This was possibly because Montrose wanted to harry Argyll's men to ensure they did not slip away, whilst hiding his own presence and the full size of his army. Auchinbreck and his officers thought that they were only fighting one of Montrose's lieutenants and not the man himself, believing he was still far up the glen. Wishart, Montrose's biographer, claimed that they only realised Montrose and his cavalry were present on hearing trumpets used as the attack signal. Just before first light, the Royalists launched their attack.

O'Cahan's men advanced first, followed by Mac Colla. The Irish closed rapidly and violently with the regular troops on both flanks. Montrose, in his letter describing the battle, stated that they went quickly to "push of pike and dint of sword". The Irish routed the two wings, exposing Auchinbreck's centre. Montrose then launched the highlanders at Argyll's regiment and the Campbell clansmen; as the first line was driven back on to the second, the latter panicked and broke. Some of the Lowland foot forming Auchinbreck's left attempted to retreat into the castle, but were blocked by the Royalist cavalry under Ogilvie and driven to the shore of the loch. Auchinbreck was shot in the thigh while trying to rally his men and died shortly afterwards. The remaining Covenanters briefly rallied around their standard, then broke and ran. The battle rapidly became a "massacre perpetrated by one set of feuding clansmen on another". Those who ran towards the loch were slaughtered, while the remainder attempted to escape into the hills. The small garrison in Inverlochy castle surrendered without a fight.

As was common in the battles of the era, the majority of casualties occurred during the rout of the retreating forces, who were pursued at least eight miles from the battlefield. In later years the graves of many of them were pointed out in Glen Nevis. Over 1500 Covenanter troops died, while Montrose lost very few men, reputedly as few as between four and eight, the most notable Royalist casualty being Sir Thomas Ogilvie who was hit by a stray bullet and died several days later. Many gentry and tacksmen serving under Argyll were killed, including John Campbell of Lochnell, Colin MacDougal of Rarra, and others. The remaining officers were all captured, although some, such as Cockburn, were shortly released on parole on the promise that they did not take up arms against the Royalists.

Iain Lom, the bard of the clan MacDonald of Keppoch, watched the battle from a vantage point on a hillside, and afterwards wrote the poem "Là Inbhir Lochaidh" ("The Day of Inverlochy") about it.

== Aftermath ==
On 11 February the Parliament of Scotland found Montrose and 19 of his main followers, including Mac Colla and Graham of Inchbrackie, guilty of high treason in their absence. The following day Argyll himself appeared before Parliament, with his arm in a sling, dismissing the loss as a minor setback. Robert Baillie afterwards wrote that "this disaster did extremely amaze us. I verily think that had Montrose come presently from that battle he should have had no opposition in the Highlands [...] scarce till he had come to Edinburgh. But God in mercy put other thoughts in his heart".

Montrose was able to use this conflict to rally Clan Donald against Clan Campbell. In many respects, the Battle of Inverlochy was as much part of the clan war between these two deadly enemies and their allies as it was part of the Wars of the Three Kingdoms, and that is how it was portrayed in Gaelic folklore. After the battle MacDonalds pursued fleeing Campbells up the Lairig Mhor, which is now part of the West Highland Way, killing those they caught. About 12 km from the battle field they stopped and marked the spot by erecting a stone which came to be known as Clach nan Caimbeulach or the Campbell's Stone. Today the place is marked by a rough cairn, or pile of stones.

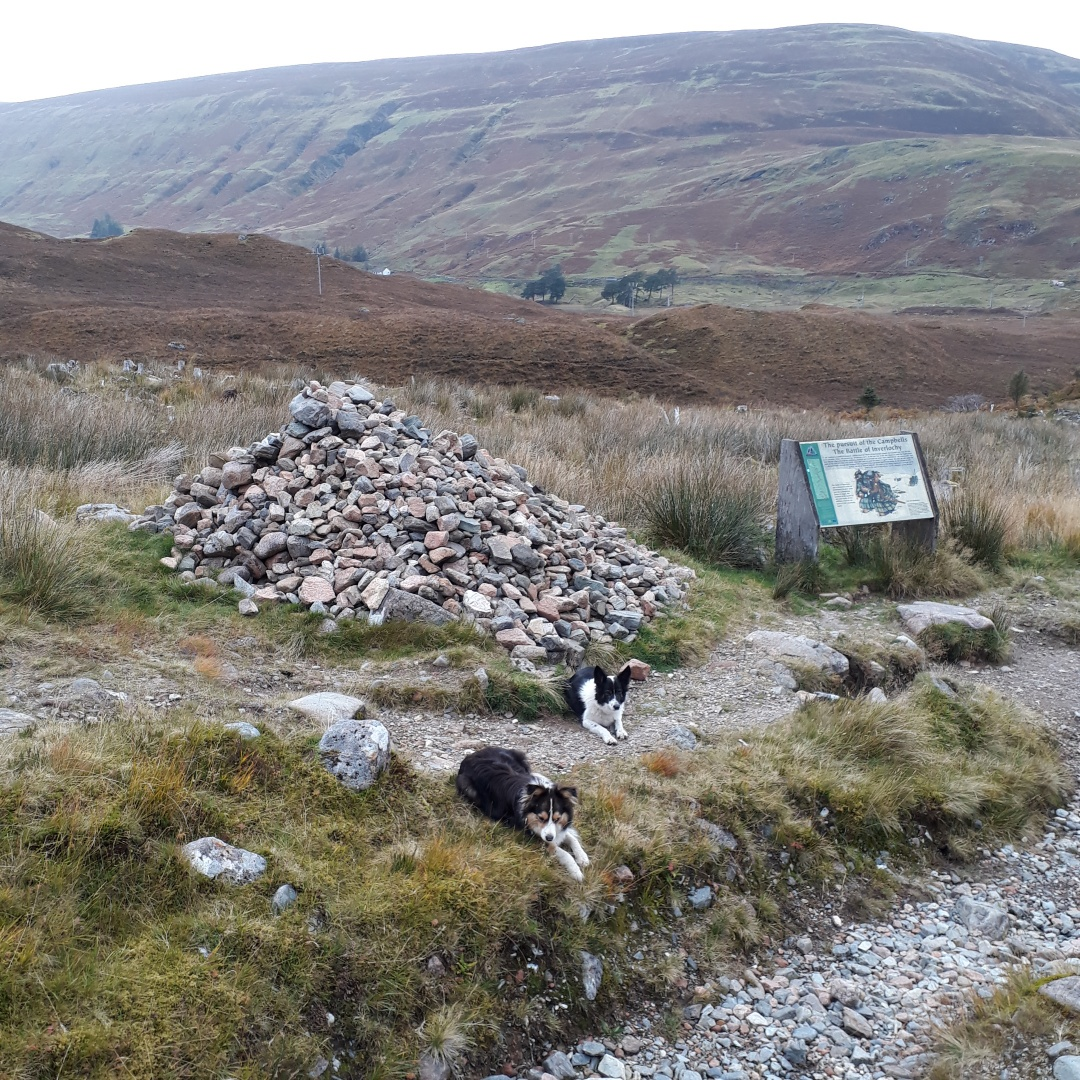
Cairn at the place where the MacDonalds stopped chasing and killing the Campbells after the Battle .

The victory also secured the cooperation in Montrose's campaign of the Marquess of Huntly, whose Clan Gordon levies made him one of the most powerful nobles in Scotland.

The battle and the Royalist campaign of 1644–1645 in general feature in the 1937 novel And No Quarter by the Irish writer Maurice Walsh, told from the perspective of two members of O'Cahan's Regiment.

== See also ==
- Battle of Inverlochy (1431)
- Scotland in the Wars of the Three Kingdoms

== General references ==
- Hastings, Max (24 October 1985). Hastings, Max (ed.). The Oxford Book of Military Anecdotes. Oxford University Press. pp. 130–135. ISBN 0-19-214107-4.
