= James Graham, 1st Marquess of Montrose =

Scottish nobleman and soldier (1612–1650)

The Most Honourable The Marquess of Montrose
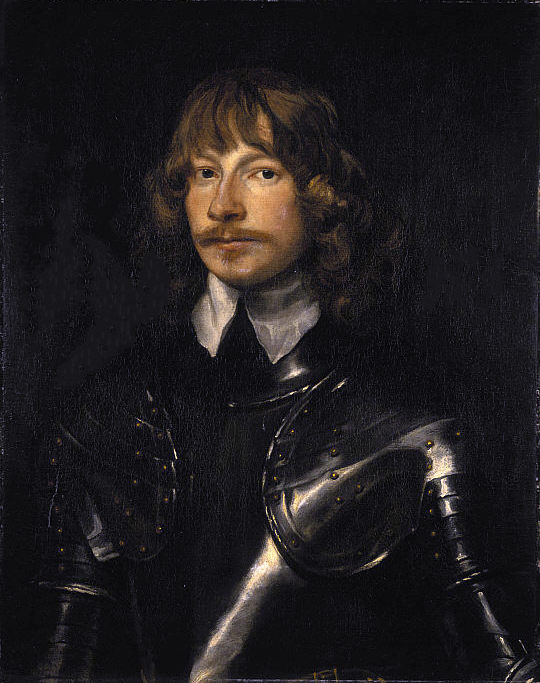
- Portrait by Anthony van Dyck, 1636
- Born: 1612; Scotland
- Died: 21 May 1650 (aged 37); Mercat Cross, Edinburgh, Scotland
- Cause of death: Execution by hanging
- Resting place: St. Giles' Cathedral, Edinburgh, Scotland
- Other name: The Great Montrose
- Education: University of St Andrews
- Occupations: Chief of Clan Graham, soldier, poet
- Title: Lord Lieutenant and captain-general of Scotland, 1st Marquess of Montrose, 5th Earl of Montrose
- Spouse: Magdalene Carnegie
- Children: James Graham, 2nd Marquess of Montrose
- Parent(s): John Graham, 4th Earl of Montrose; Margaret Ruthven
- Military career
- Conflicts: Bishops' Wars; Battle of the Brig of Dee; First English Civil War; Battle of Tippermuir; Battle of Aberdeen; Battle of Inverlochy; Battle of Auldearn; Battle of Alford; Battle of Kilsyth; Battle of Philiphaugh; Siege of Inverness; Battle of Carbisdale

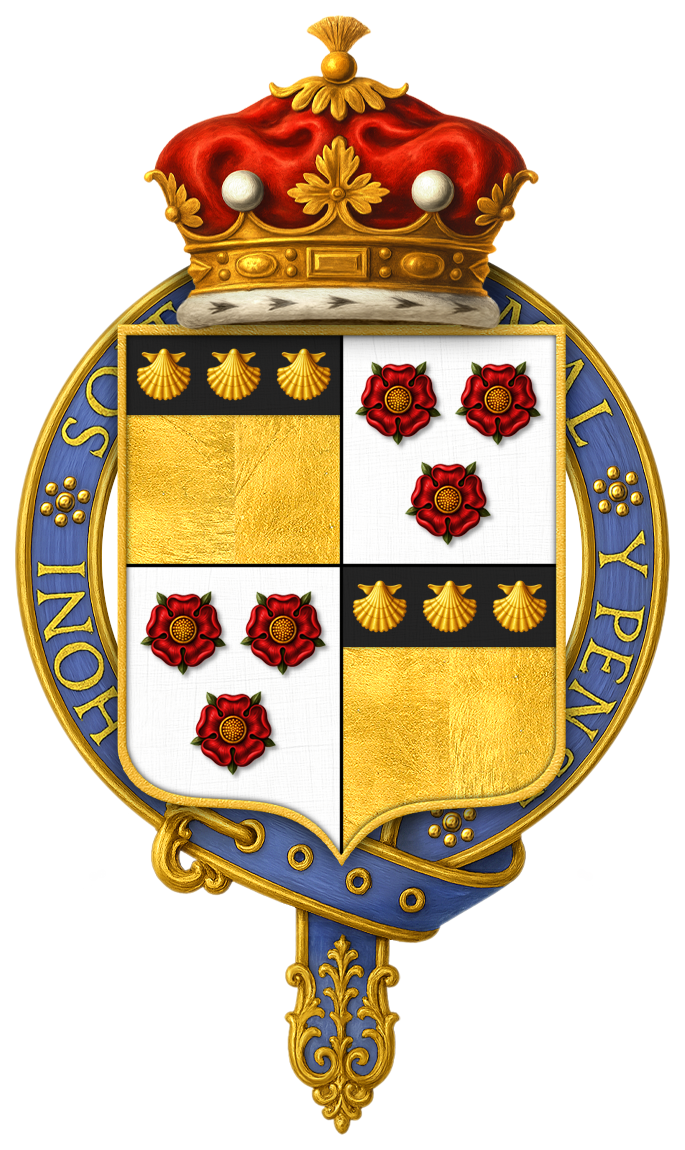
Quartered arms of James Graham, 1st Marquess of Montrose, KG

James Graham, 1st Marquess of Montrose (1612 – 21 May 1650) was a Scottish nobleman, poet, soldier and later viceroy and captain general of Scotland. Montrose initially joined the Covenanters in the Wars of the Three Kingdoms, but subsequently supported King Charles I as the English Civil War developed. From 1644 to 1646, and again in 1650, he fought in the civil war in Scotland on behalf of the King. He is referred to as the Great Montrose.

Following his defeat and capture at the Battle of Carbisdale, Montrose was tried by the Scottish Parliament and sentenced to death by hanging, followed by beheading and quartering. After the Restoration, Charles II paid £802 sterling for a lavish funeral in 1661. Montrose's reputation later changed from traitor or martyr to a romantic hero and subject of works by Walter Scott and John Buchan. His spectacular victories, which took his opponents by surprise, are remembered in military history for their tactical brilliance.

== Background and family ==
James Graham, Chief of Clan Graham, was the youngest of six children and the only son of John Graham, 4th Earl of Montrose, and Lady Margaret Ruthven. The exact date and place of his birth are unknown, but it was probably in mid-October. His maternal grandparents were William Ruthven, 1st Earl of Gowrie, and Dorothea Stewart, a daughter of Henry Stewart, 1st Lord Methven and his second wife Janet Stewart, daughter of John Stewart, 2nd Earl of Atholl.

Montrose studied at age twelve at the college of Glasgow under William Forrett who later tutored his sons. At Glasgow, he read Xenophon and Seneca, and Tasso in translation. In the words of biographer John Buchan, his favourite book was a "splendid folio of the first edition" of The History of the World by Walter Raleigh. Montrose became 5th Earl of Montrose by his father's death in 1626. He was then educated at Saint Salvator's College at the University of St Andrews.

At the age of seventeen, he married Magdalene Carnegie, who was the youngest of six daughters of David Carnegie (afterwards Earl of Southesk). They were parents of four sons, among them James Graham, 2nd Marquess of Montrose.

Montrose traveled extensively in Europe through France, Italy and the German principalities. He had a famous love-affair with Princess Louise Hollandine, daughter of the Elector Palatine and sister of Prince Rupert of the Rhine.

== Covenanter to royalist ==
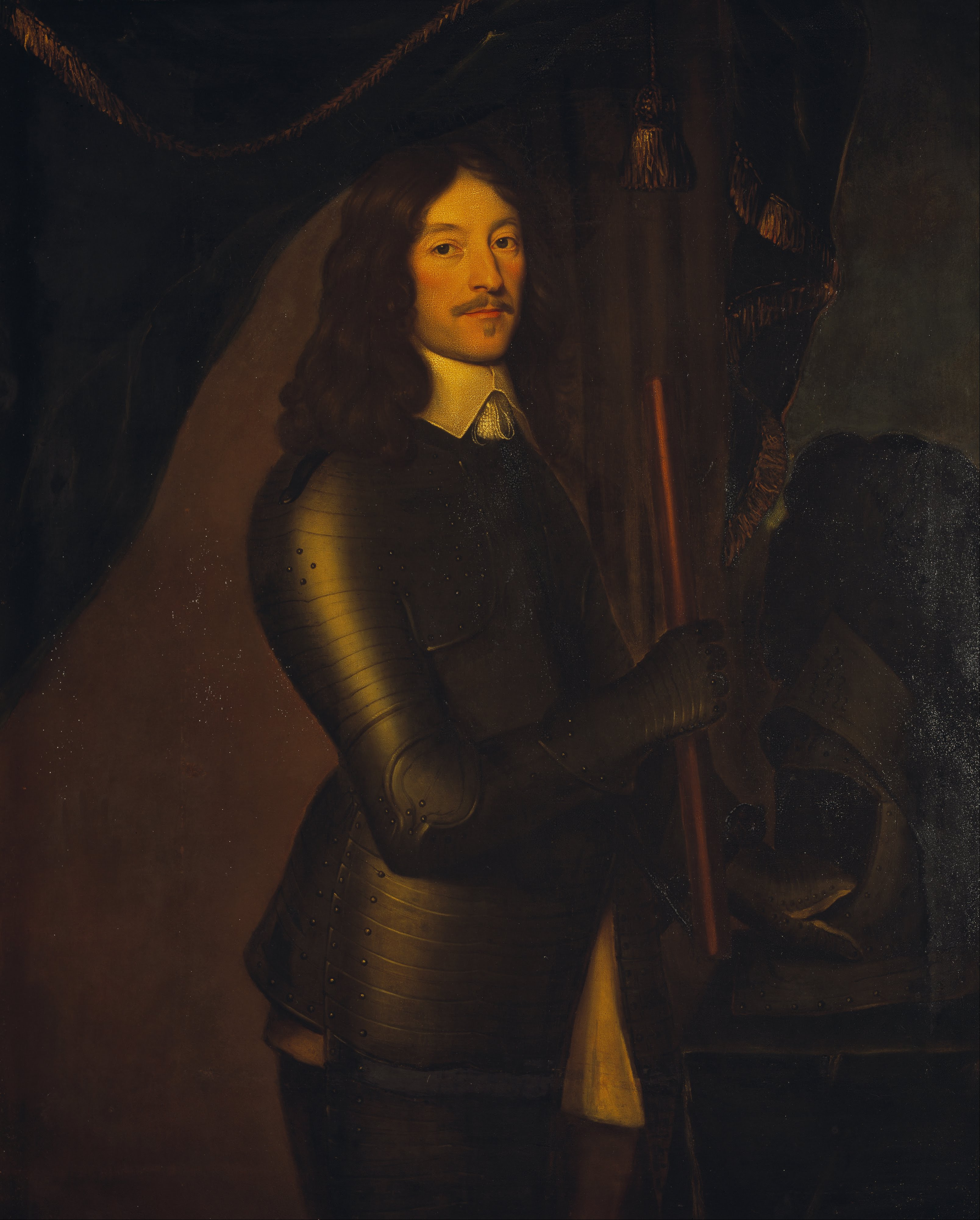
Portrait attributed to Willem van Honthorst

In 1638, after King Charles I had attempted to impose an Episcopalian version of the Book of Common Prayer upon the reluctant Scots, resistance spread throughout the country, eventually culminating in the Bishops' Wars. Montrose joined the party of resistance, and was for some time one of its most energetic champions. He had nothing puritanical in his nature, but he shared in the ill-feeling aroused by the political authority which King Charles had given to the bishops.

Montrose signed the National Covenant, and was part of Alexander Leslie's army sent to suppress the opposition which arose around Aberdeen and in the country of the Gordons. Though often cited as commander of the expedition, the Aberdeen Council letter books are explicit that the troops entered Aberdeen "under the conduct of General Leslie" who remained in charge in the city until 12 April. Three times Montrose entered Aberdeen. On the second occasion, the leader of the Gordons, the Marquess of Huntly entered the city under a pass of safe conduct but ended up accompanying Montrose to Edinburgh, with his supporters saying as a prisoner and in breach of the pass, but Cowan is clear Huntly chose to go voluntarily, rather than as prisoner, noting "by giving out he had been forced to accompany Montrose he was neatly easing his own predicament and at the same time sparing Montrose a great deal of embarrassment". Spalding also supports that Huntly went voluntarily. Montrose was a leader of the delegation who subsequently met at Muchalls Castle to parley regarding the 1638 confrontation with Adam Bellenden, the Bishop of Aberdeen. With the Earl Marischal he led a force of 9000 men across the Causey Mounth through the Portlethen Moss to attack Royalists at the Battle of the Brig of Dee. These events played a part in Charles I's decision to grant major concessions to the Covenanters.

In July 1639, after the signing of the Treaty of Berwick, Montrose was one of the Covenanting leaders who visited Charles. His change of mind, eventually leading to his support for the King, arose from his wish to get rid of the bishops without making Presbyterians masters of the state. His was essentially a layman's view of the situation. Taking no account of the real forces of the time, he aimed at an ideal form of society in which the clergy should confine themselves to their spiritual duties, and the king should uphold law and order. In the Scottish parliament which met in September, Montrose found himself opposed by Archibald Campbell, 1st Marquess of Argyll, who had gradually assumed leadership of the Presbyterian and national party, and of the estate of burgesses. Montrose, on the other hand, wished to bring the King's authority to bear upon parliament to defeat Argyll, and offered the King the support of a great number of nobles. He failed, because Charles could not even then consent to abandon the bishops, and because no Scottish party of any weight could be formed unless Presbyterianism were established as the ecclesiastical power in Scotland.

Rather than give way, Charles prepared in 1640 to invade Scotland. Montrose was of necessity driven to play something of a double game. In August 1640 he signed the Bond of Cumbernauld as a protest against the particular and direct practising of a few, in other words, against the ambition of Argyll. But he took his place amongst the defenders of his country, and in the same month displayed his gallantry in action at the forcing of the River Tyne at Newburn. On 27 May 1641 he was summoned before the Committee of Estates and charged with intrigues against Argyll, and on 11 June he was imprisoned by them in Edinburgh Castle. Charles visited Scotland to give his formal assent to the abolition of Episcopacy, and upon the King's return to England, Montrose shared in the amnesty tacitly accorded to all Charles's partisans.

== Wars of the Three Kingdoms ==
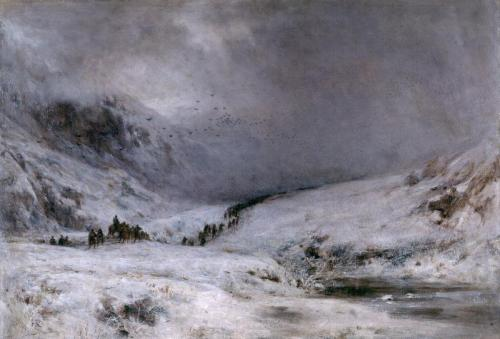
Passage of Montrose's Army Through Glencoe by Sir George Reid, 1876

The king signed a warrant for his Marquessate and appointed Montrose Lord Lieutenant of Scotland, both in 1644. A year later in 1645, the king commissioned him captain general. His military campaigns were fought quickly and used the element of surprise to overcome his opponents even when sometimes dauntingly outnumbered. At one point, Montrose dressed himself as the groom of the Earl of Leven and travelled away from Carlisle, and the eventual capture of his party, in disguise with "two followers, four sorry horses, little money and no baggage".

Highlanders had never before been known to combine, but Montrose knew that many of the West Highland clans, who were largely Catholic, detested Argyll and his Campbell clansmen, and none more so than the MacDonalds who with many of the other clans rallied to his summons. The Royalist allied Irish Confederates sent 2000 disciplined Irish soldiers led by Alasdair MacColla across the sea to assist him. The Irish proved to be formidable fighters.

In two campaigns, distinguished by rapidity of movement, he met and defeated his opponents in six battles. At Tippermuir and Aberdeen he routed Covenanting levies; at Inverlochy he crushed the Campbells, at Auldearn, Alford and Kilsyth his victories were obtained over well-led and disciplined armies.

The fiery enthusiasm of the Gordons and other clans often carried the day, but Montrose relied more upon the disciplined infantry from Ireland. His strategy at Inverlochy, and his tactics at Aberdeen, Auldearn and Kilsyth furnished models of the military art, but above all his daring and constancy marked him out as one of the great soldiers of his time. His career of victory was crowned by the great Battle of Kilsyth on 15 August 1645. Such was the extent of his military fame that King Louis XIV offered him the position of Marshal of France.

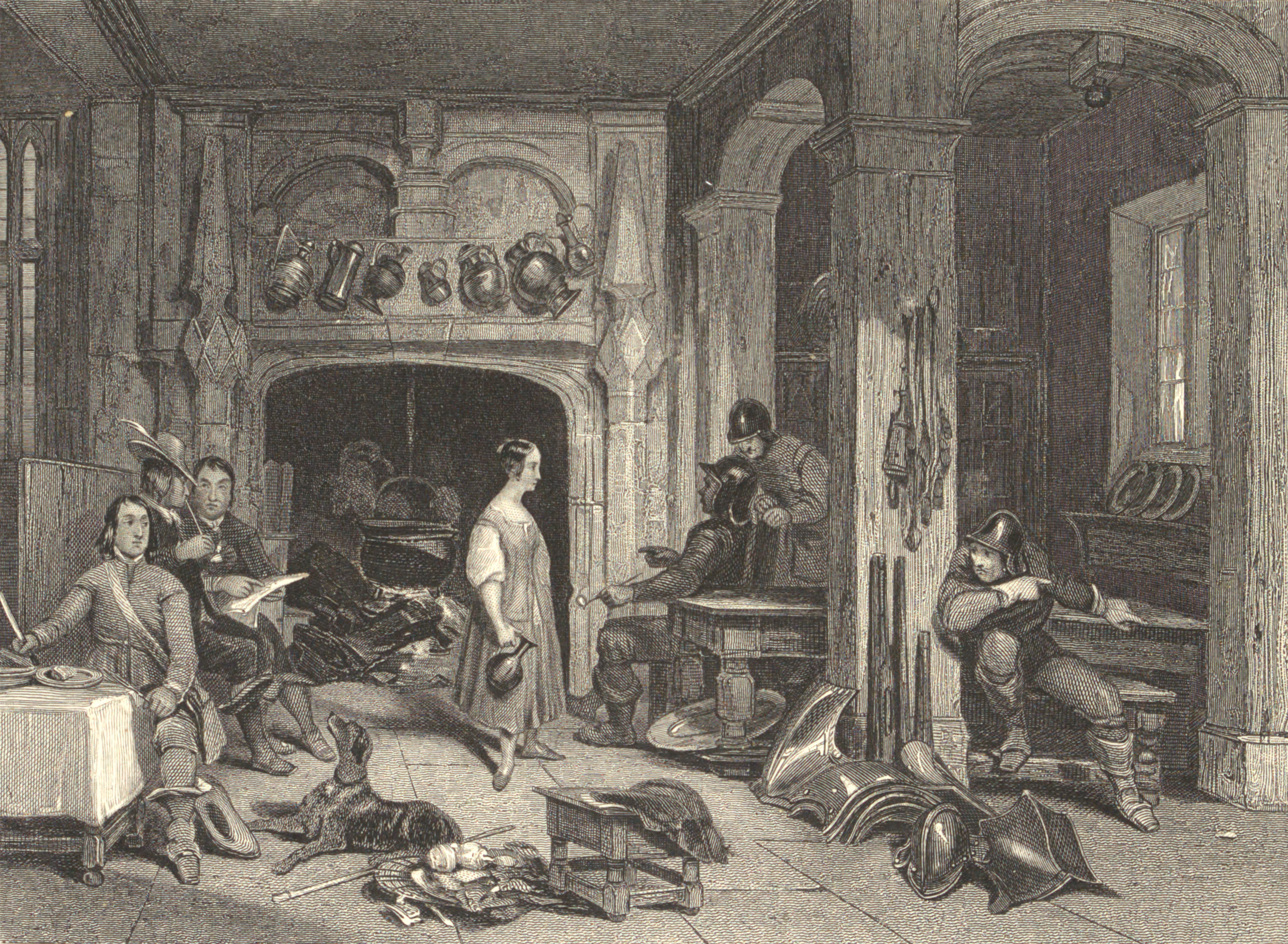
The arrest of Montrose (an 1875 engraving)

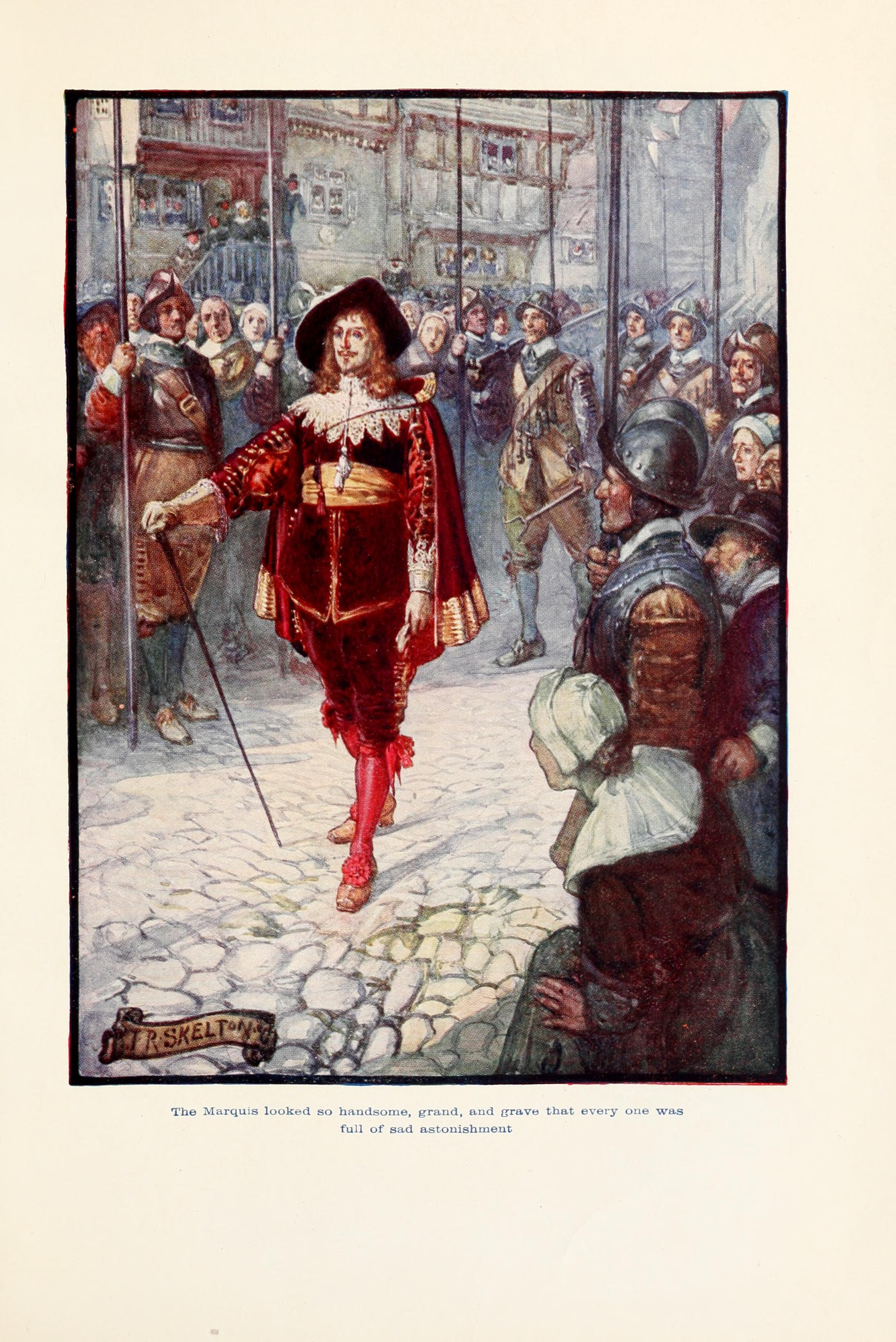
Montrose in streets of Edinburgh before the day of his hanging

Now Montrose found himself apparently master of Scotland. After Kilsyth, the king's secretary arrived with letters from Charles documenting that Montrose was lieutenant and captain general. He first conferred knighthood on Alasdair. Then he summoned a parliament to meet at Glasgow on 20 October, in which he no doubt hoped to reconcile loyal obedience to the King with the establishment of a non-political Presbyterian clergy. That parliament never met. Charles had been defeated at the Battle of Naseby on 14 June 1645, and Montrose had to come to his aid if there was to be still a king to proclaim. David Leslie, one of the best Scottish generals, was promptly dispatched against Montrose to anticipate the invasion. On 12 September he came upon Montrose, who had been deserted by his Highlanders and was guarded only by a little group of followers, at Philiphaugh. He won an easy victory. Montrose cut his way through to the Highlands; but he failed to organise an army. In September 1646 he embarked for Norway. Stories of his victories as documented in Latin by George Wishart reached the continent and he was offered an appointment as lieutenant-general in the French army, and Ferdinand III, Holy Roman Emperor awarded him the rank of field marshal, but Montrose remained devoted to the service of King Charles and to his son, Charles II.

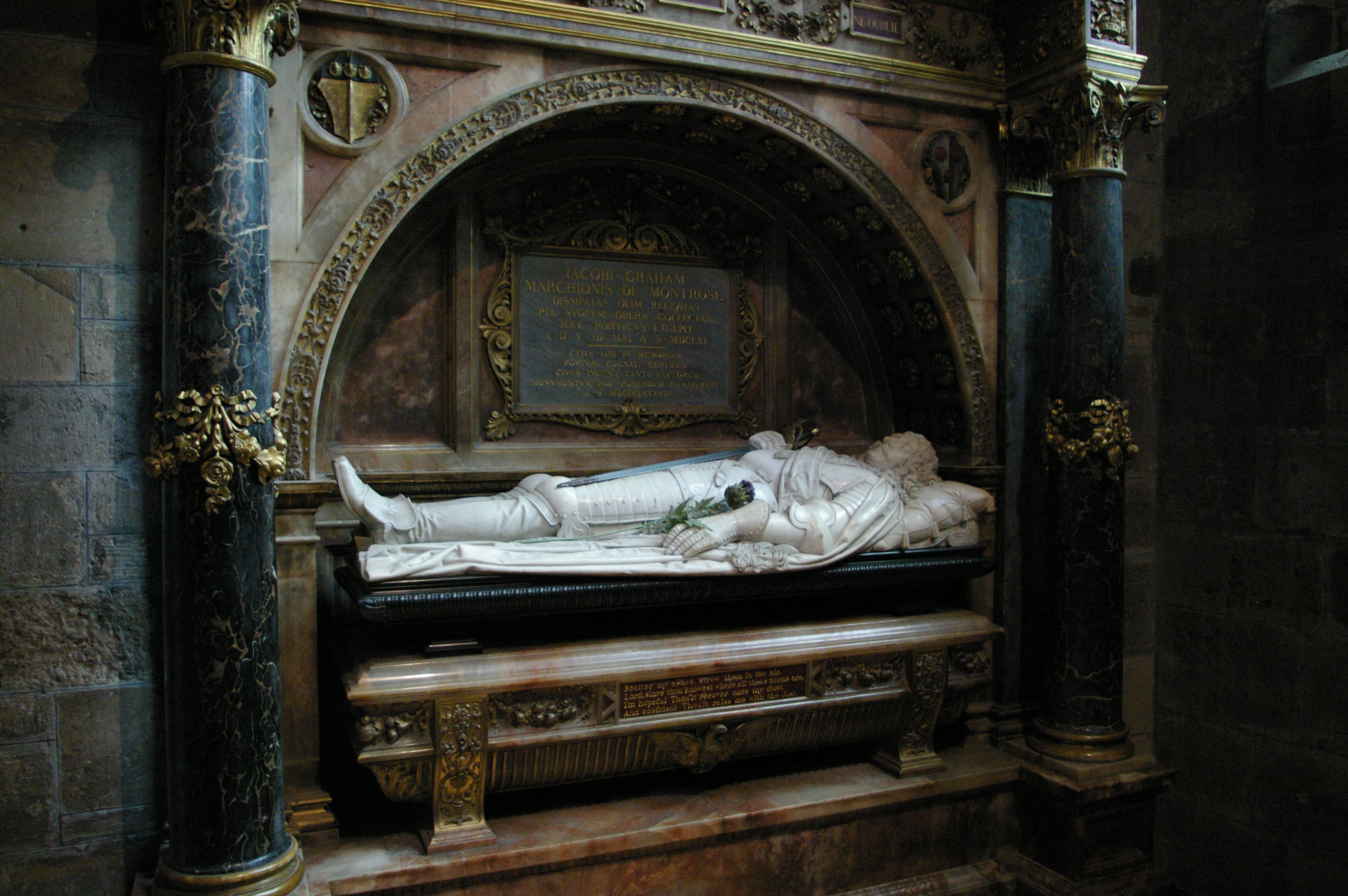
The exhumed body of Montrose was placed inside St. Giles' Cathedral. His tomb is inscribed with lines from one of his poems, "Scatter my ashes, strew them in the air/Lord, since thou knowest where all these atoms are..."

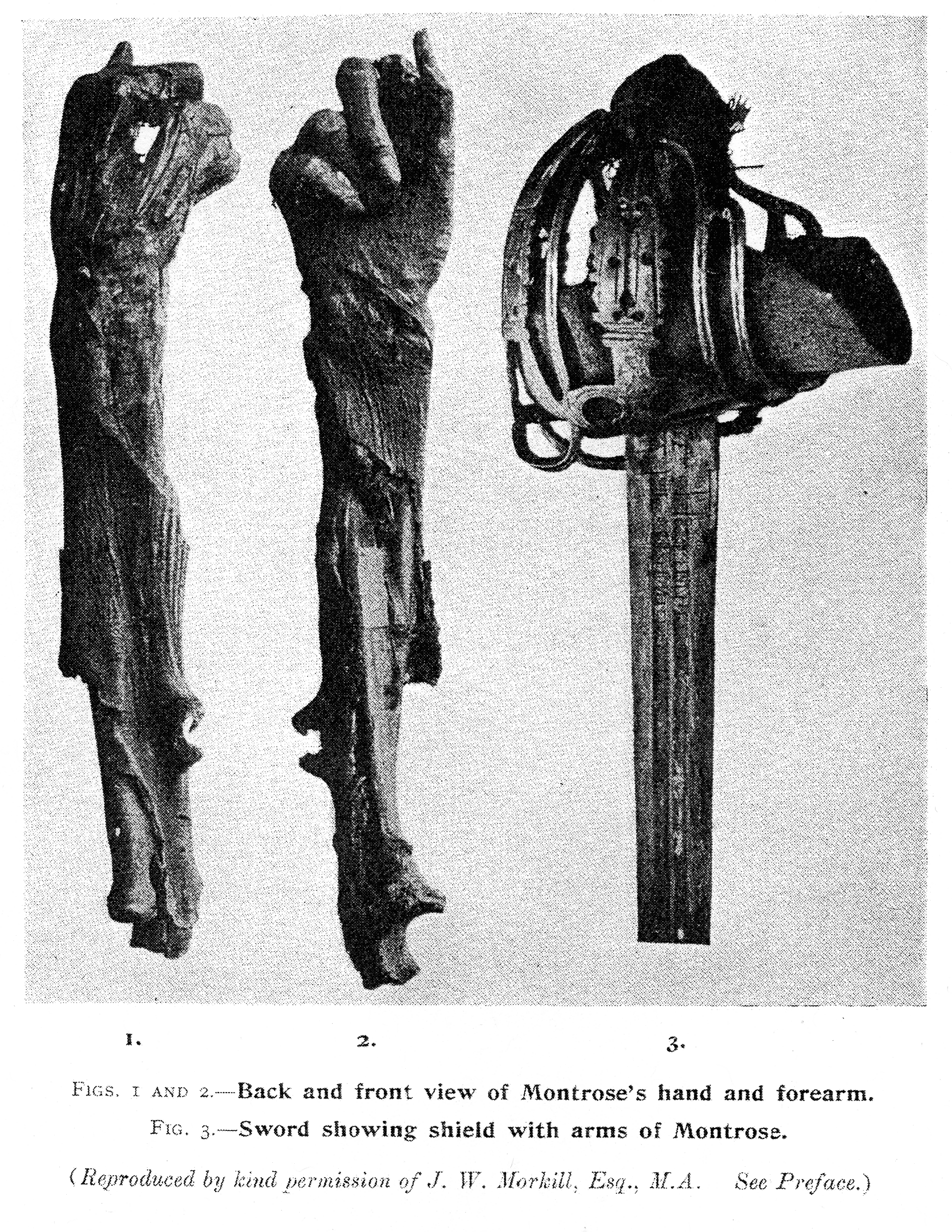
A souvenir of Montrose's hanging: His right arm (seen front and back) and sword. The arm was nailed at the gate of Dundee, later was carried off to England, and was never buried with his remains.

== Disavowed by Charles II, executed, and posthumously rehabilitated ==
Montrose was to appear once more on the stage of Scottish history. In June 1649, eager to avenge the death of the King, he was restored by the exiled Charles II to the now nominal lieutenancy of Scotland. Charles, however, did not scruple soon afterwards to disavow his noblest supporter to become King on terms dictated by Argyll and his adherents. In March 1650, Montrose landed in Orkney to take command of a small force which he had sent on before him with George Hay, 3rd Earl of Kinnoull. Crossing to the mainland, he tried in vain to raise the clans, and on 27 April was surprised and routed at the Battle of Carbisdale in Ross-shire. His forces were defeated in battle but he escaped. After wandering for some time, he was surrendered by Neil MacLeod of Assynt at Ardvreck Castle, to whose protection, in ignorance of MacLeod's political enmity, he had entrusted himself. He was brought a prisoner to Edinburgh, and on 20 May sentenced to death by the parliament. He was hanged on the 21st, with Wishart's laudatory biography of him around his neck. He protested to the last that he was in truth a Covenanter and a loyal subject. Grant states that the execution was overseen by the Edinburgh City Guard under command of Major Weir.

His head was removed and stood on the "prick on the highest stone" of the Old Tolbooth outside St Giles' Cathedral from 1650 until the beginning of 1661.

Shortly after Montrose's death, the Scottish Argyll Government switched sides to support Charles II's attempt to regain the English throne, provided he was willing to impose the Solemn League and Covenant in England for a trial period at least. After the Restoration, Montrose was officially rehabilitated in the public memory.

== Fate of Montrose's remains ==
On 7 January 1661, Montrose's mangled torso was disinterred from the gallows ground on the Burgh Muir and carried under a velvet canopy to the Tolbooth, where his head was reverently removed from the spike, before the procession continued on its way to Holyrood Abbey. The diarist John Nicoll wrote the following eyewitness account of the event:

[A guard of honour of four captains with their companies, all of them in] thair armes and displayit colouris, quha eftir a lang space marching up an doun the streitis, went out thaireftir to the Burrow mure quhair his corps wer bureyit, and quhair sundry nobles and gentrie his freindis and favorites, both hors and fute wer thair attending; and thair, in presence of sundry nobles, earls, lordis, barones and otheris convenit for the tyme, his graif [grave] was raisit, his body and bones taken out and wrappit up in curious clothes and put in a coffin, quhilk, under a canopy of rich velwet, wer careyit from the Burrow-mure to the Toun of Edinburgh; the nobles barones and gentrie on hors, the Toun of Edinburgh and many thousandis besyde, convoyit these corpis all along, the callouris [colours] fleying, drums towking [beating], trumpettis sounding, muskets cracking and cannones from the Castell roring; all of thame walking on until thai come to the Tolbuith of Edinburgh, frae the quhilke his heid wes very honorablie and with all dew respectis taken doun and put within the coffin under the cannopie with great acclamation and joy; all this tyme the trumpettis, the drumes, cannouns, gunes, the displayit cullouris geving honor to these deid corps. From thence all of thame, both hors and fute, convoyit these deid corps to the Abay Kirk of Halyrudhous quhair he is left inclosit in ane yll [aisle] until forder ordour be by his Majestie and Estaites of Parliament for the solempnitie of his Buriall.

Montrose's limbs were brought from the towns to which they had been sent (Glasgow, Perth, Stirling and Aberdeen) and placed in his coffin, as he lay in state at Holyrood. A splendid funeral was held in the church of St. Giles on 11 May 1661.

The torso of an executed person would have normally been given to friends or family; but Montrose was the subject of an excommunication, which was why it was originally buried in unconsecrated ground. In 1650 his niece, Lady Napier, had sent men by night to remove his heart. This relic she placed in a steel case made from his sword and placed the whole in a gold filigree box, which had been presented to her family by a Doge of Venice. The heart in its case was retained by the Napier family for several generations until lost amidst the confusion of the French Revolution.

== Battle history ==
Montrose had successive victories at the Battle of Tippermuir, with the support of Alasdair MacColla and his Irish soldiers, the Battle of Aberdeen, the Battle of Inverlochy, the Battle of Auldearn, the Battle of Alford, and the Battle of Kilsyth, which was the largest battle of the conflict in Scotland. After several years of continuous victories, Montrose was finally defeated at the Battle of Philiphaugh on 13 September 1645 by the Covenanter army of David, Lord Newark, restoring the power of the Committee of Estates.

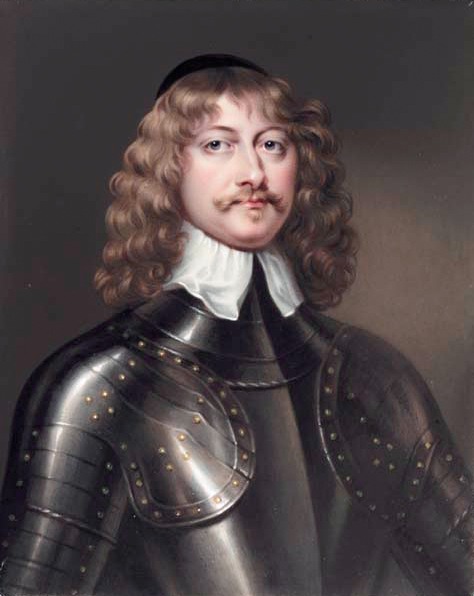
Miniature (1838), after Van Dyck original owned by the present-day Duke of Montrose

In March 1650 he captured Dunbeath Castle of the Clan Sinclair, who would later support him at Carbisdale. Montrose was defeated at the Battle of Carbisdale by the Munros, Rosses, Sutherlands and Colonel Archibald Strachan.

== In literature ==
=== In fiction ===
- A Legend of Montrose (1819) by Sir Walter Scott
- John Splendid (1898) by Neil Munro
- Witch Wood by John Buchan (1927)
- And No Quarter by Maurice Walsh (1937)
- The Bride (1939) and The Proud Servant (1949) by Margaret Irwin
- The Young Montrose (1972) and Montrose:The Captain-General (1973) by Nigel Tranter
- Graham came by Cleish (1973) by James L. Dow
- Lady Magdalen (2003) by Robin Jenkins. Focuses primarily on Magdalen, Montrose's wife.

=== In poetry ===
In his 1751 poetry collection Ais-Eiridh na Sean Chánoin Albannaich ("The Resurrection of the Old Scottish Language"), which was the first published secular book in the history of Scottish Gaelic literature, the Jacobite war poet and military officer Alasdair Mac Mhaighstir Alasdair both translated into Gaelic and versified several famous statements made by Montrose expressing his loyalty to the House of Stuart during the English Civil War.

=== In song ===
Steeleye Span performed a folk-rock ballad covering the wars of Montrose, in their 1978 album Live at Last.

== Bibliography ==
- Buchan, John (1928). Montrose. Edinburgh: Thomas Nelson and Sons Ltd.
- Montrose (1952) by CV Wedgwood
- Montrose: The King's Champion (1977) by Max Hastings

Authorities for Montrose's career include George Wishart's Res gestae, etc. (Amsterdam, 1647), published in English as Memoirs of the Most Renowned James Graham, Marquis of Montrose; Patrick Gordon's Short Abridgment of Britanes Distemper (Spalding Club); and the comprehensive works of Napier. These include Montrose and Covenanters; his Memorials of Montrose is abundantly documented, containing Montrose's poetry, including the celebrated lyric "My dear and only love."

Peerage of Scotland
New creation	Marquess of Montrose; 1644–1650	Succeeded by James Graham
Preceded by John Graham	Earl of Montrose; 1626–1650	Succeeded by James Graham
