= Committee of Estates =

The Committee of Estates governed Scotland during the Wars of the Three Kingdoms (1638–1651) when the Parliament of Scotland was not sitting. It was dominated by Covenanters of which the most influential faction was that of the Earl of Argyll. The committee, with wide legislative and executive powers, was appointed again following the Glorious Revolution and met between 1688 and 1689.

The Committee derives its name from the "Estates of Scotland" which was an alternative name for the Parliament of Scotland (see the Three Estates of Scotland).
