= Battle of Tippermuir =

Part of the Wars of the Three Kingdoms

- Part of the Wars of the Three Kingdoms
Date	1 September 1644
Location	Perth, Scotland 56°23′44″N 3°32′24″W
Result	Royalist victory

Belligerents
Scottish Royalists; Irish Brigade	Parliament of Scotland

Commanders and leaders
Lord Montrose; Alasdair Mac Colla; John Graham; Lord Kilpont; Sir William Rollo	Lord Elcho; James Murray; Earl of Tullibardine; Sir James Scott of Rossie; James, Lord Drummond; Captain David Grant

Strength
2,000–3,000 foot 150 cavalry	Disputed: c.2,000–7,000 foot c.400–800 cavalry

Casualties and losses
Light	400–2,000

Registered battlefield
- Designated: 14 December 2012
- Reference no.: BTL39
- Location within Scotland

The Battle of Tippermuir (also known as the Battle of Tibbermuir or Battle of Tibbermore) (1 September 1644) was the first battle James Graham, 1st Marquis of Montrose, fought for King Charles I in the Scottish theatre of the Wars of the Three Kingdoms. During the battle, Montrose's Royalist forces routed an army of the Covenanter-dominated Scottish government under John Wemyss, Lord Elcho. The government side took heavy losses. The battle was the last to involve the English longbow.

The battlefield is presently inventoried and protected by Historic Environment Scotland under the Scottish Historical Environment Policy of 2009.

== Background ==
Under the terms of the 1643 Solemn League and Covenant, the Scottish Parliament, dominated by a hardline Presbyterian faction known as the Covenanters, had agreed to intervene on the Parliamentarian side in the First English Civil War. At the invitation of the English Parliament, a large Scottish army under Alexander Leslie, 1st Earl of Leven entered England in January 1644. The Royalist party, fearing that the Scots intervention would prove decisive, sought to find ways of tying down troops in Scotland to prevent them assisting the English Parliamentarians.

King Charles I had already designated Montrose, a disaffected former signatory of the original National Covenant - as distinct from the slightly later Solemn League and Covenant - as Captain-General in Scotland. An initial attempt by George Gordon, 2nd Marquess of Huntly and Montrose to begin a Royalist uprising misfired badly, but the Royalist plans were advanced when Confederate Ireland, at the instigation of the Earl of Antrim, aided the Royalists by sending 2000 professional soldiers to Scotland led by Antrim's kinsman Alasdair Mac Colla. The Irish landed at Ardnamurchan on the west coast in early July 1644, and initially made to link up with Huntly, but the latter had by then effectively gone into hiding. Montrose was, however, able to meet Mac Colla at Blair Atholl late in August. Mac Colla had already been joined by a contingent from Clan MacDonald of Keppoch and had effectively compelled 400–500 men from Badenoch to join his force by pressuring local lairds. Their army was further increased by the addition of a small regiment of Athollmen raised for Montrose by Patrick Graham of Inchbrakie.

From Blair Atholl, Montrose made a rapid march south-eastwards towards the strategically sited town of Perth. With the majority of its best troops with Leslie in England, the Scottish government hastily assembled an army to defend the town under the overall command of John Wemyss, Lord Elcho and James Murray, Earl of Tullibardine. While Tullibardine and Elcho had two small regiments of relatively inexperienced regular troops, most of their men were untrained levies: the order to assemble at Perth only went out four days before the battle. A group of Perthshire levies from Clan Stewart, Clan Robertson and Clan Graham, led by Lord Kilpont, James Stewart of Ardvorlich and Montrose's brother-in-law the Master of Madertie (or Madderty), were amongst those called out by the government but promptly deserted to the Royalists.

== Battle ==
=== Order of battle and deployments ===
Montrose's Highlanders and the Irish regiments together possibly made up no more than 2,000 men, perhaps rising to 3,000 through further recruitment on the march from Blair Atholl. The Irish troops were likely experienced soldiers, although the remaining Royalists were either levies or 'irregulars'. The traditional historiography of the battle suggests that Elcho had up to 7,000 infantry and 800 cavalry, the latter being considered the "cream of the army", along with local militia and a number of small frame guns. However, these figures are based largely on Royalist accounts, and a figure of 2,000 foot – mainly untrained militia – and 400 horse may be more accurate for the Covenanter side. Indeed, some modern historians such as Stuart Reid have suggested that the Royalist forces outnumbered the government troops.

- Royalist (James Graham, Lord Montrose)
  - Patrick Graham of Inchbrakie's Regiment
  - Irish Brigade (Alasdair Mac Colla)
    - Thomas Laghtnan's Regiment
    - Manus O'Cahan's Regiment
    - James Macdonnell's Regiment
  - Badenoch levies
  - Perthshire levies (Lord Kilpont)
  - MacDonalds of Keppoch
- Covenanter (John Wemyss, Lord Elcho)
  - Earl of Tullibardine's Regiment
  - Lord Elcho's Regiment
  - Dundee and Forfarshire levies
  - Perth Trained Bands (Captain David Grant)
  - Sir James Scott of Rossie's Regiment of Horse
  - Lord Drummond's Regiment of Horse

The two armies deployed on the relatively flat ground at Tippermuir (modern day Tibbermore) around three miles outside of Perth. On the Covenanters' side, Lord Elcho commanded the right wing of cavalry, Tullibardine commanded the centre, made up of infantry, and the left flank of cavalry was given over to Sir James Scott of Rossie; Rossie was the only veteran soldier present in the Covenant army that day. Montrose put Lord Kilpont and his 400 levies on the left, directly in front of Elcho, along with the Keppoch MacDonalds. Montrose himself commanded the right wing, made up of Inchbrakie's Graham regiment and the Athollmen: in the centre he placed the Irish under Mac Colla, backed with the Badenoch men. According to Ruthven, Montrose drew up his troops in a line only three deep, outflanking Elcho's front, though it is possible that the Royalist centre was kept a more conventional six lines deep.

Again according to the traditional historiography of the battle, the battle cry of Elcho's force was said to have been "Jesus and no quarter!" Montrose's Irish troops were said to have been reduced to a single round of ammunition each, and Montrose is supposed to have delivered a speech saying: "Gentlemen: it is true you have no arms; your enemy, however, to all appearance, have plenty. My advice to you therefore is that as there happens to be a great abundance of stones upon this moor, every man should provide himself, in the first place, with as stout a one as he can manage, rush up to the first Covenanter he meets, beat out his brains, take his sword, and then I believe he will be at no loss how to proceed!" Another version of the speech runs "Be sparing of your powder, we have none to throw away. Let not a musket be fired except in the very face of the enemy. Give but a single discharge, and then at them with the claymore, in the name of God and the King".

=== The actions ===
Tullibardine first sent forward a group of cavalry and foot in skirmish to engage the Irish, possibly to take advantage of the latter's shortage of ammunition. However, the Irish skirmishers drove back their opponents, causing a degree of confusion in the government centre. Montrose then gave an order to charge, and Mac Colla's experienced troops moved forward, clashing violently with the largely untrained militia making up Tullibardine's infantry: the first and second ranks rapidly lost their composure and began to fall back.

Scott of Rossie attempted to hold the left flank, but Montrose led his Athollmen in a charge that placed them in front of Scott's men, and pushed them back into the main body of the Covenanters. While there was an attempt by some of the Covenanters to rally and regroup, most of their troops quickly broke and were routed. As was common in fighting of the era, the majority of casualties occurred in the rout as the battle now turned into a bloodbath. A group of townspeople had come to view the battle, believing Montrose's army would be quickly subdued. Now they were caught up in the slaughter, and in the confusion many died. It was reported that a man could walk from Tippermuir to Perth on the bodies of the slain.

Elcho is reported, in some accounts, to have lost up to 2,000 men and Montrose only one, plus another man who died afterwards. Others suggest that only twelve men in total were killed on the field, but the bodies of a further 400 were found between Tippermuir and Perth where they had been cut down in the rout. The dead included several prominent local gentry: Captain David Grant, who had led the Perth militia, William Forbes the Laird of Reires (or Rires), Patrick Oliphant of Bachilton, and George Haliburton of Keilor (or Keilour). However, there are no independent estimates of casualties and as with the relative size of the two armies, some figures may represent propaganda reports from either side.

== Aftermath ==
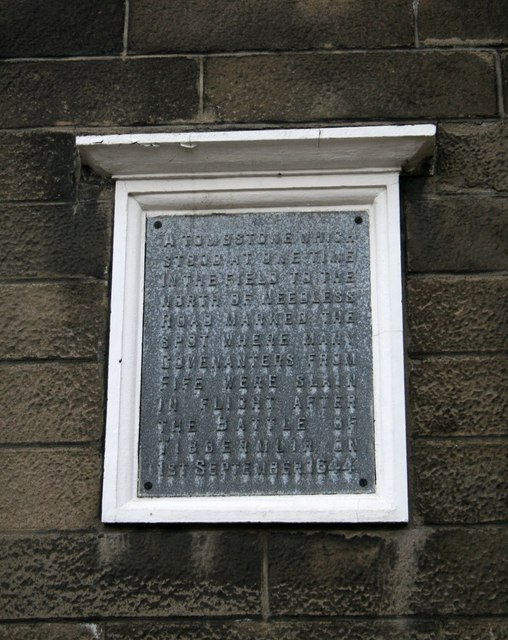
A commemorative plaque on Needless Road in Perth. It reads: "A tombstone which stood at one time in the field to the north of Needless Road marked the spot where many covenanters from Fife were slain in flight after the Battle of Tibbermuir on 1st September 1644"

Perth was surrounded by Montrose's forces later that day, and surrendered almost immediately. Although the town did not suffer major damage, it was sacked for two days by the victorious Royalist troops, with cloth to the value of £1,300 stolen from local merchants. However, Montrose vacated Perth on 4 September, partly to seek more recruits in Angus and partly as a stronger government force under the Marquess of Argyll was approaching the town from the west.

One of the Royalist commanders, Lord Kilpont, was murdered in a quarrel by fellow Royalist James Stewart of Ardvorlich shortly after the battle. Stewart escaped and was later to join with the Covenanters, being given the rank of Major in Argyll's regiment. The battle effectively revived the Royalist cause in Scotland, and Montrose would confront, and rout, government troops again at Aberdeen later in the month.

== The battle in popular culture ==
Events leading up to the battle and the Royalist campaign of 1644–1645 are the centrepiece of the 1937 novel And No Quarter by the Irish writer Maurice Walsh.

The battle is also described in The Young Montrose by Nigel Tranter.
