= Battle of Mauchline Muir =

Battle during the Wars of the Three Kingdoms in 1648

Coordinates: 55.50783°N 4.38022°W

- Part of the Scottish Civil War
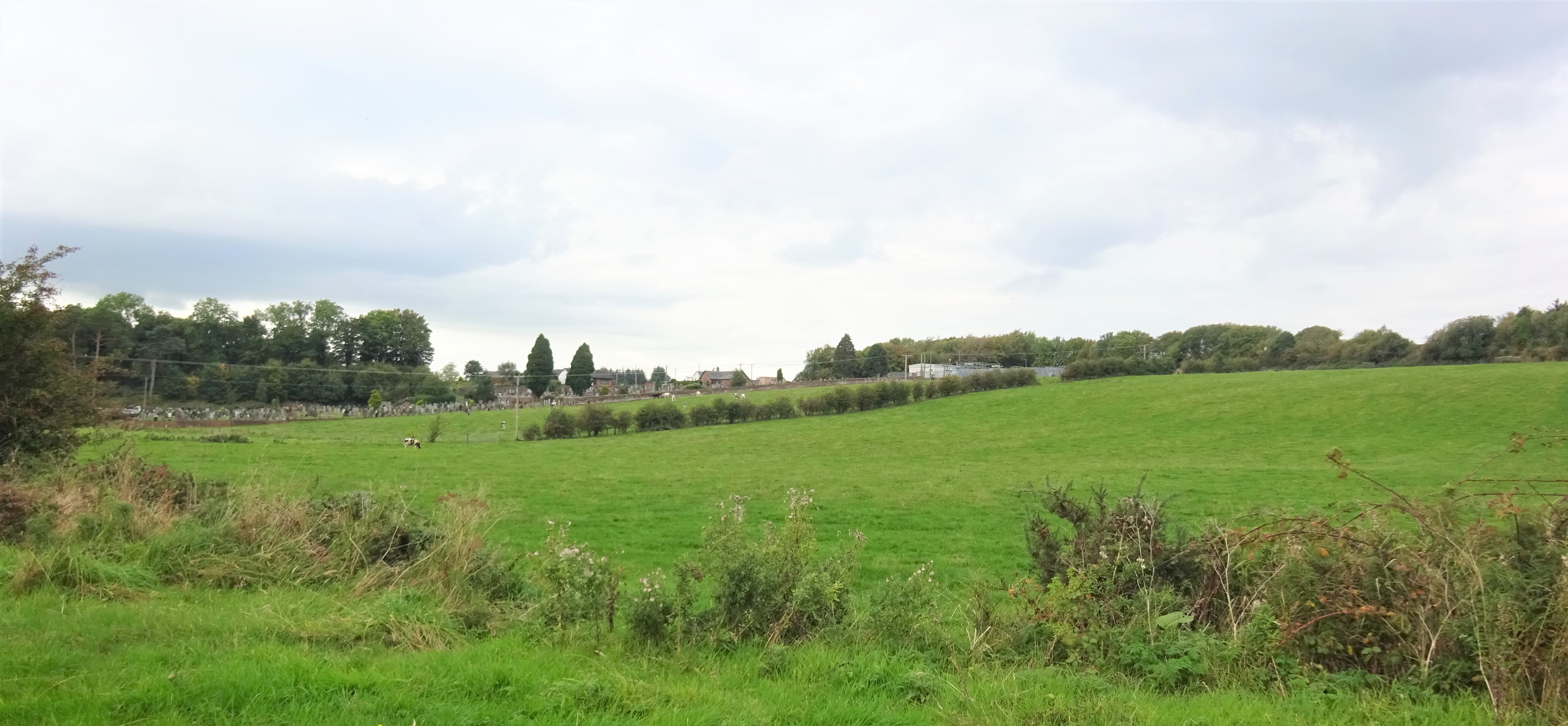
- Mauchline Muir battle site
Date	12 June 1648
Location	Mauchline, Ayrshire, Scotland
Result	Inconclusive

Belligerents
Engagers Party	Kirk Party

Commanders and leaders
John Middleton; James Livingstone	John Campbell

Strength
800 infantry 1,200 cavalry	850 cavalry

Scotland and Mauchline

The Battle of Mauchline Muir was an engagement fought on 12 June 1648 between two rival factions of the Covenanters of Scotland. On one side were those who favoured The Engagement, known as Engagers, and on the other those who were opposed to the Engagement, and known as the Kirk party.

== Background ==
By 1646, the Presbyterian Covenanter movement had defeated the Scottish Royalists, who favoured unconditional loyalty to King Charles I. In 1646 at the end of the First English Civil War, Charles I had surrendered to the Scottish army which was in England fighting as an ally of the English Parliament. As part of the negotiated agreement for their payment and withdrawal back to Scotland, the Scots handed Charles over to the English Parliament and returned to Scotland in 1647.

In the negotiations over what constitutional settlement should be implemented the Scottish Covenanters were one of four parties to the negotiations. The other three parties were Charles, the English Parliament dominated Presbyterians, and the Independents in the New Model Army. Charles stalled for time hoping that either his supporters in alliance with one or more of the other parties would succeed in restoring him to his throne with little or no change to his constitutional position.

In December 1647 a faction in the Covenanters reached an agreement with King Charles known as The Engagement in which he promised that if the Covenanters would support him militarily he would support the establishment of Presbyterianism in England for a period of three years. The faction known as the Kirk Party, strongly influenced by the General Assembly were opposed, arguing against an agreement which didn't include the permanent adoption of Presbyterianism and attacked the Parliament of Scotland for proceeding in matters of religion without consulting them.

In April 1648 the Engagers took control of the Scottish Parliament, and they authorised the sending of an army, under the command of James, Duke of Hamilton, south to implement the agreement. England had been engulfed in the Second English Civil War and Hamilton was joined by a force of royalists under Marmaduke Langdale.

== Battle ==
In June 1648, a members of the Kirk party gathered in Mauchline to join in a celebration of the Eucharist that lasted several days. Following the celebration 2,000 armed Kirk party supporters gathered on the Mauchline Moor, choosing leaders in evident preparation of making their dissatisfaction with the Engagement known. Into the midst of this rode five troops loyal to the Scottish Parliament and the Engagement. They were commanded by John Middleton, 1st Earl of Middleton, and James Livingstone, Earl of Callender.

The Kirk party supporters had in their company seven ministers who managed to obtain assurance from the Engager leaders that if their group surrendered, there would be an amnesty. But the majority of the Kirk party did not accept these terms. Many were eager for the fight and some 200 of the party were deserters who were excluded from the amnesty.

For some time, the Kirk party supporters held their own, but when reinforcements arrived to more than double the Engager troops, the day was decided. Though the Engagers took the day, each side of the conflict lost roughly equal numbers, with combined fatalities estimated between 30 and 40 men. All seven ministers and 65 members of the Kirk party were arrested, but later freed.

== Aftermath ==
While the Engagers were victorious, the battle itself helped firm Scottish opposition to the Engagement. A couple of months after this small victory the Engager army commanded by James Duke of Hamilton suffered a crushing defeat by New Model Army at the Battle of Preston, and after a short civil war in Scotland the Kirk party emerged as victors (see Whiggamore Raid, the Battle of Stirling and the Treaty of Stirling). Subsequently, a Scottish Parliament convened in Edinburgh on 4 January 1649 and "approved the opposition" represented by those at Mauchline.
