= History of Christianity in Scotland =

The history of Christianity in Scotland includes all aspects of the Christianity in the region that is now Scotland from its introduction up to the present day. Christianity was first introduced to what is now southern Scotland during the Roman occupation of Britain, and is often said to have been spread by missionaries from Ireland in the fifth century and is much associated with St Ninian, St Kentigern (perhaps better known as St Mungo) and St Columba, though “they first appear in places where churches had already been established”. The Christianity that developed in Ireland and Scotland differed from that led by Rome, particularly over the method of calculating Easter, and the form of tonsure until the Celtic church accepted Roman practices in the mid-seventh century.

Christianity in Scotland is often said to have been strongly influenced by monasticism, with abbots being more significant than bishops, although both Kentigern and Ninian were bishops. “It is impossible now to generalise about the nature or structure of the early medieval church in Scotland”. In the Norman period, there was a series of reforms resulting in a clearer parochial structure based around local churches and large numbers of new monastic foundations, which followed continental forms of reformed monasticism, began to predominate. The Scottish church also established its independence from England, developing a clear diocesan structure and becoming a "special daughter of the see of Rome", but it continued to lack Scottish leadership in the form of Archbishops. In the late Middle Ages the crown was able to gain greater influence over senior appointments, and two archbishoprics had been established by the end of the fifteenth century. There was a decline in traditional monastic life, but the mendicant orders of friars grew, particularly in the expanding burghs. New saints and cults of devotion also proliferated. Despite problems over the number and quality of clergy after the Black Death in the fourteenth century, and evidence of heresy in the fifteenth century, the Church in Scotland remained stable.

During the sixteenth century, Scotland underwent a Protestant Reformation that created a predominately Calvinist national kirk, which was strongly Presbyterian in outlook. A confession of faith, rejecting papal jurisdiction and the mass, was adopted by Parliament in 1560. The kirk would find it difficult to penetrate the Highlands and Islands, but began a gradual process of conversion and consolidation that, compared with reformations elsewhere, was conducted with relatively little persecution. James VI favoured doctrinal Calvinism but supported the bishops. Charles I brought in reforms seen as a return to papal practice. The result was the Bishop's Wars in 1639–40, ending in virtual independence for Scotland and the establishment of a fully Presbyterian system by the dominant Covenanters. After the Restoration of the Monarchy in 1660, Scotland regained its kirk, but also the bishops. Particularly in the south-west, many of the people began to attend illegal field conventicles. Suppression of these assemblies in the 1680s known as "the Killing Time". After the "Glorious Revolution" in 1688 Presbyterianism was restored.

The late eighteenth century saw the beginnings of a fragmentation of the Church of Scotland that had been created in the Reformation around issues of government and patronage, but reflected a wider division between the Evangelicals and the Moderate Party. In 1733 the First Secession led to the creation of a series of secessionist churches and the second in 1761 to the foundation of the independent Relief Church. These churches gained strength in the Evangelical Revival of the later eighteenth century. Penetration of the Highlands and Islands remained limited. The efforts of the Kirk were supplemented by missionaries of the SSPCK. Episcopalianism retained supporters, but declined because of its associations with Jacobitism. Beginning in 1834, the "Ten Years' Conflict" ended in a schism from the church led by Dr Thomas Chalmers known as the Great Disruption of 1843. Roughly a third of the clergy, mainly from the North and Highlands, formed the separate Free Church of Scotland. The evangelical Free Churches grew rapidly in the Highlands and Islands. In the late nineteenth century, the major debates were between fundamentalist Calvinists and theological liberals resulted in a further split in the Free Church, as the rigid Calvinists broke away to form the Free Presbyterian Church in 1893.

From this point there were moves towards reunion that would ultimately result in the majority of the Free Church rejoining the Church of Scotland in 1929. The schisms left small denominations, including the Free Presbyterians, and a remnant that had not merged in 1900 as the Free Church. Catholic Emancipation in 1829, and the influx of large numbers of Irish immigrants, led to an expansion of Catholicism, with the restoration of the Church hierarchy in 1878. Episcopalianism also revived in the nineteenth century with the Scottish Episcopal Church being organised as an autonomous body in communion with the Church of England in 1804. Other denominations included Baptists, Congregationalists and Methodists. In the twentieth century, existing Christian denominations were joined by the Brethren and Pentecostal churches. Although some denominations thrived, after World War II there was a steady overall decline in church attendance and resulting church closures for most denominations. Other denominations in Scotland include the Jehovah's Witnesses and the Church of Jesus Christ of Latter-day Saints.

== Middle Ages ==
=== Early Christianity ===
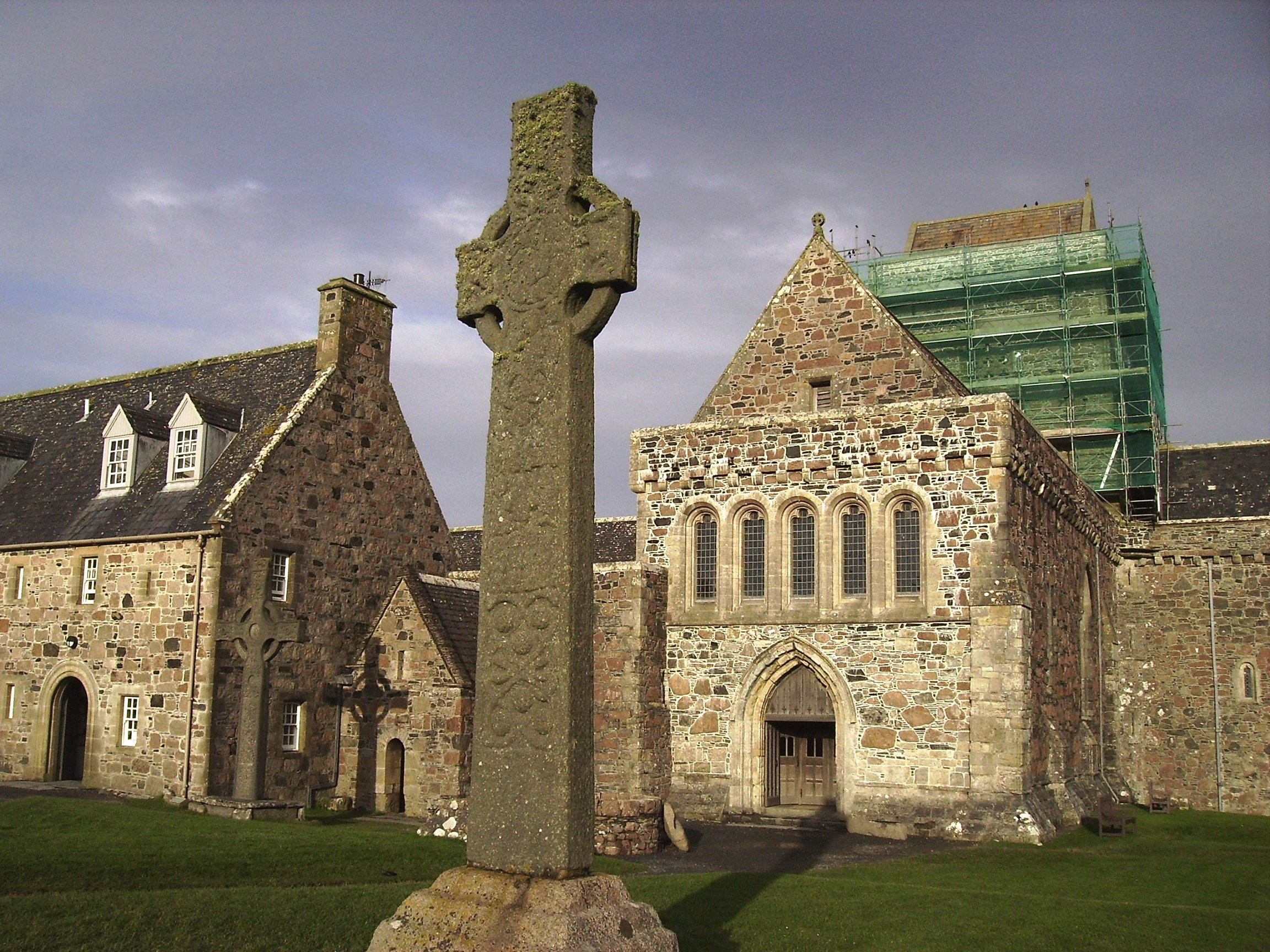
The 9th century St Martin's Cross, with St John's cross in the background, stands outside the entrance to Iona Abbey

Christianity was probably introduced to what is now southern Scotland during the Roman occupation of Britain. While the Picts and Scots away from Roman influence would have remained pagan, most scholars presume that Christianity would have survived after the departure of the Romans among the Brythonic enclaves such as Strathclyde, but retreated as the pagan Anglo-Saxons advanced into what is now the Lowlands of Scotland.

In the sixth century, missionaries from Ireland were operating on the British mainland. This movement is traditionally associated with the figures of St Ninian, St Kentigern and St Columba. Ninian is now regarded as largely a construct of the Northumbrian church, after the Bernician takeover of Whithorn and conquest of southern Galloway. The name itself is a scribal corruption of Uinniau ('n's and 'u's look almost identical in early insular calligraphy), a saint of probable British extraction who is also known by the Gaelic equivalent of his name, Finnian. Little is known of St Kentigern (died 614), who probably worked in the Strathclyde region. St Columba was probably a disciple of Uinniau. He left Ireland and founded the monastery at Iona off the West Coast of Scotland in 563 and from there carried out missions to the Scots of Dál Riata, who are traditionally seen as having colonised the West of modern Scotland from what is now Ireland, and the Picts, thought to be the descendants of the Caledonians that existed beyond the control of the Roman Empire in the North and East. However, it seems likely that both the Scots and Picts had already begun to convert to Christianity before this.

=== Celtic Christianity ===
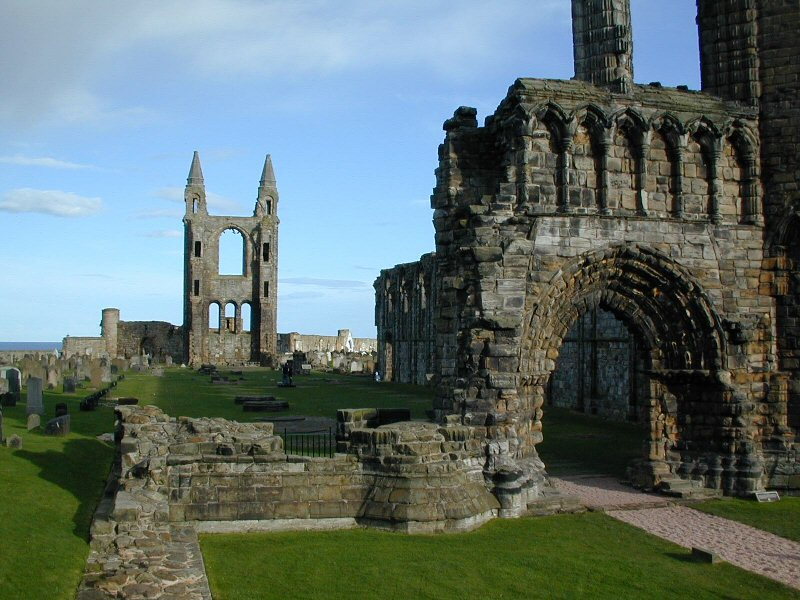
The ruins of the Cathedral of St Andrew in St Andrews, Fife

Early Pictish religion is presumed to have resembled Celtic polytheism in general. The date at which Pictish kings converted to Christianity is uncertain, but there are traditions which place Saint Palladius in Pictland after leaving Ireland, and link Abernethy with Saints Brigid and Darlugdach of Kildare. Saint Patrick refers to "apostate Picts", while the poem Y Gododdin does not remark on the Picts as pagans. Conversion of the Pictish élite seems likely to have run over a considerable period, beginning in the fifth century and not complete until the seventh. Recent archaeological work at Portmahomack places the foundation of the monastery there, an area once assumed to be among the last converted, in the late sixth century. This is contemporary with Bridei mac Maelchon and Columba. The process of establishing Christianity throughout Pictland will have extended over a much longer period. Pictland was not solely influenced by Iona and Ireland. It also had ties to churches in England, as seen in the reign of Nechtan mac Der Ilei. The reported expulsion of Ionan monks and clergy by Nechtan in 717 may have been related to the controversy over the dating of Easter, and the manner of tonsure, where Nechtan appears to have supported the Roman usages, but may equally have been intended to increase royal power over the church. Nonetheless, the evidence of place names suggests a wide area of Ionan influence in Pictland.

=== Gaelic monasticism ===
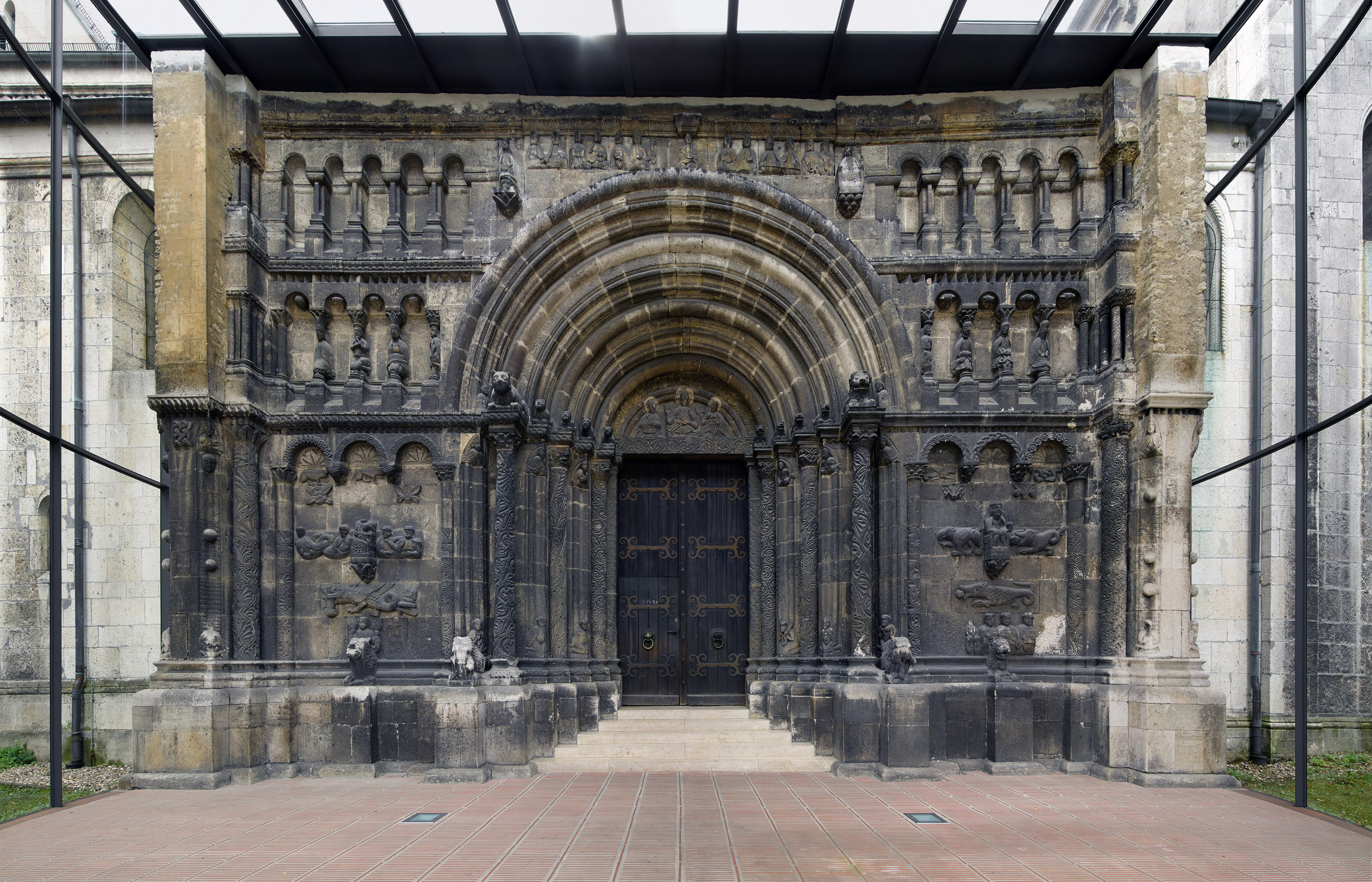
Schottenportal at the Scottish Monastery, Ratisbon

Physically Scottish monasteries differed significantly from those on the continent, and were often an isolated collection of wooden huts surrounded by a wall. The Irish architectural influence can be seen in surviving round towers at Brechin and Abernethy. Some early Scottish establishments had dynasties of abbots, who were often secular clergy with families, most famously at Dunkeld and Brechin; but these also existed across Scotland north of the Forth, as at Portmahomack, Mortlach, and Abernethy. Perhaps in reaction to this secularisation, a reforming movement of monks called Céli Dé (lit. "vassals of God"), anglicised as culdees, began in Ireland and spread to Scotland in the late eighth and early ninth centuries. Some Céli Dé took vows of chastity and poverty and while some lived individually as hermits, others lived beside or within existing monasteries. In most cases, even after the introduction of new forms of reformed monasticism from the eleventh century, these Céli Dé were not replaced and the tradition continued in parallel with the new foundations until the thirteenth century.

Scottish monasticism played a major part in the Hiberno-Scottish mission, by which Scottish and Irish clergy undertook missions to the expanding Frankish Empire. They founded monasteries, often called Schottenklöster (meaning Scottish monasteries in German), most of which became Benedictine establishments in what is now Germany. Scottish monks, such as St Cathróe of Metz, became local saints in the region.

=== Continental monasticism ===
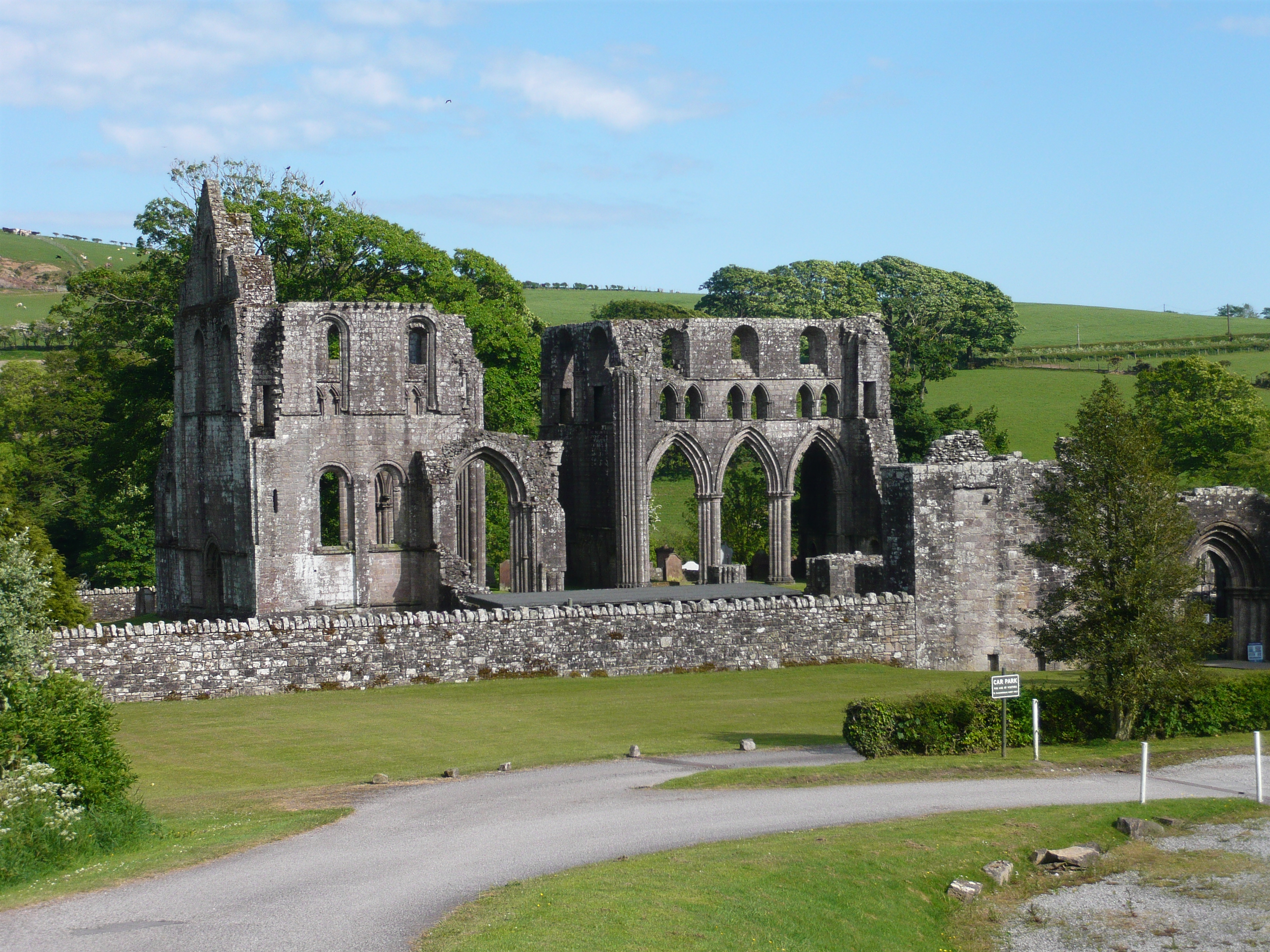
Dundrennan Abbey, one of the new continental monasteries founded in the 12th century.

The introduction of continental forms of monasticism to Scotland is associated with Saxon princess Queen Margaret (c. 1045–1093), the second wife of Máel Coluim III (r. 1058–1093). Lanfranc, Archbishop of Canterbury provided monks for a new Benedictine abbey at Dunfermline (c. 1070). Subsequent foundations under Edgar (r. 1097–1107), Alexander (r. 1107–1124) and David I (r. 1124–1153), tended from the religious orders that originated in France in the eleventh and twelfth centuries and followed the Cluniac Reforms. The Augustinians, established their first priory in Scotland at Scone, with the sponsorship by Alexander I in 1115. By the early thirteenth century Augustinians had settled alongside, taken over or reformed Céli Dé establishments at St Andrews, St Serf's Inch, Inchcolm, Inchmahome, Inchaffray, Restenneth and Iona, and had created numerous new establishments, such as Holyrood Abbey. The Cistercians, had foundations, at Melrose (1136) and Dundrennan (1142), and the Tironensians, at Selkirk, then Kelso, Arbroath, Lindores and Kilwinning. Cluniacs founded an abbey at Paisley, the Premonstratensians, had foundations at Whithorn and the Valliscaulians, named after their first monastery at Val-des-Choux in Burgundy, at Pluscarden. The military orders entered Scotland under David I, with the Knights Templer founding Balantrodoch in Midlothian and the Knights Hospitallers being given Torphichen, West Lothian.

=== Ecclesia Scoticana ===
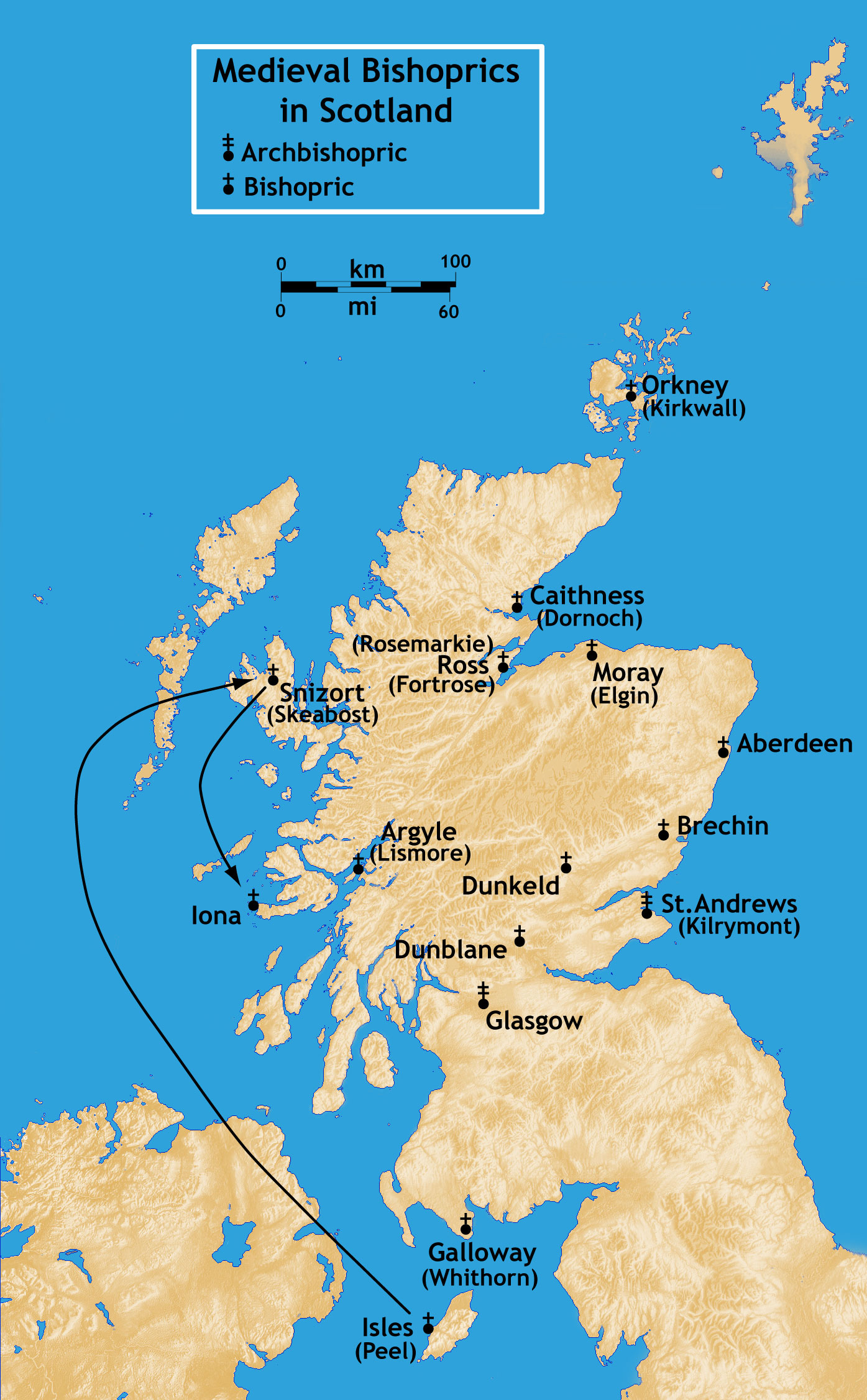
Bishoprics in Medieval Scotland.

Before the Norman period, Scotland had little clear diocesan structure. There were bishoprics based on various ancient churches, but some are very obscure in the records and there appear to be long vacancies. From around 1070, in the reign of Malcolm III, there was a "Bishop of Alba" resident at St. Andrews, but it is not clear what authority he had over the other bishops. After the Norman Conquest of England, the Archbishops of both Canterbury and York each claimed superiority over the Scottish church. When David I secured the appointment of John, a Tironensian monk, as Bishop of Glasgow around 1113, Thurstan Archbishop of York demanded the new bishop's submission. A long running dispute followed, with John travelling to Rome to unsuccessfully appeal his case before pope Calixtus II. John continued to withhold his submission despite papal pressure to do so. A new bishopric of Carlisle was created in what is now northern England, claimed as part of the Glasgow diocese and as territory by David I. In 1126 a new bishop was appointed to the southern Diocese of Galloway based at Whithorn, who offered his submission to York, a practice which would continue until the fifteenth century. David sent John to Rome to lobby for the Bishop of St. Andrew's to be made an independent archbishop. At one point David and his bishops threatened to transfer their allegiance to the anti-pope Anacletus II. When Bishop John died in 1147 David was able to appoint another Tironensian monk, Herbert abbot of Kelso, as his successor and submission to York continued to be withheld. The church in Scotland attained independent status after the Papal Bull of Celestine III (Cum universi, 1192) by which all Scottish bishoprics except Galloway became formally independent of York and Canterbury. However, unlike Ireland which had been granted four Archbishoprics in the same century, Scotland received no Archbishop and the whole Ecclesia Scoticana, with individual Scottish bishoprics (except Whithorn/Galloway), became the "special daughter of the see of Rome". It was run by special councils of made up of all the Scottish bishops, with the bishop of St Andrews emerging as the most important figure. It would not be until 1472 and 1492 respectively, that the sees of St Andrews and Glasgow were raised to archbishoprics, during the papacy of Sixtus IV.

=== Clerics ===
Up until the early fourteenth century, the Papacy minimised the problem of clerical pluralism, but with relatively poor livings and a shortage of clergy, particularly after the Black Death, in the fifteenth century the number of clerics holding two or more livings rapidly increased. This meant that parish clergy were largely drawn from the lower and less educated ranks of the profession, leading to frequent complaints about their standards of education or ability, although there is little clear evidence that this was actually declining. As elsewhere in Europe, the collapse of papal authority in the Papal Schism had allowed the Scottish crown to gain effective control of major ecclesiastical appointments within the kingdom, a position recognised by the Papacy in 1487. This led to the placement of clients and relatives of the king in key positions, including James IV's illegitimate son Alexander, who was nominated as Archbishop of St. Andrews at the age of eleven, intensifying royal influence and also opening the Church to accusations of venality and nepotism. Despite this, relationships between the Scottish crown and the Papacy were generally good, with James IV receiving tokens of papal favour.

=== Saints ===
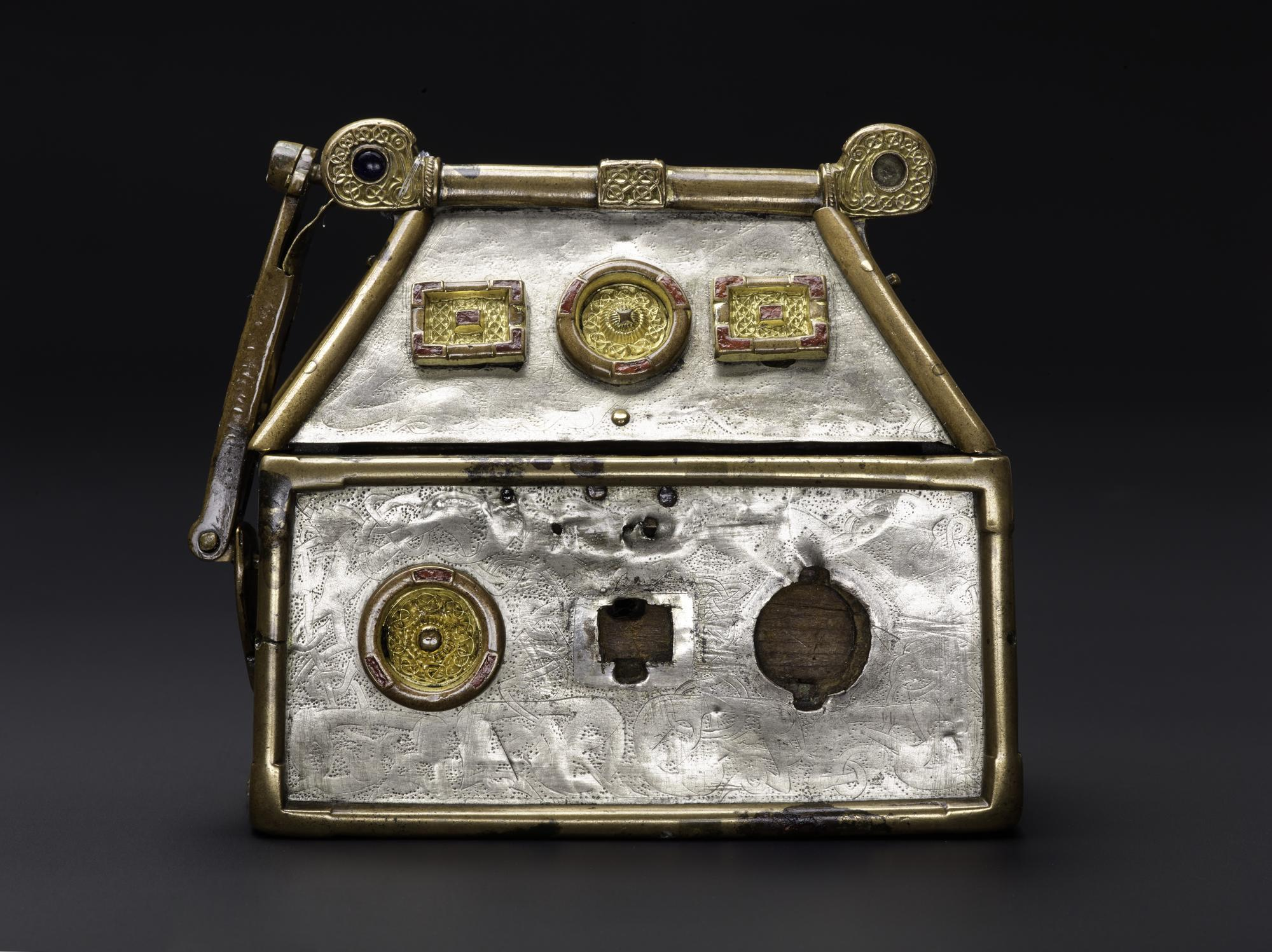
The Monymusk Reliquary, or Brecbennoch, dates from c. 750, and purportedly enclosed bones of Columba

Like every other Christian country, one of the main features of Medieval Scotland was the Cult of Saints. Saints of Irish origin who were particularly revered included various figures called St Faelan and St. Colman, and saints Findbar and Finan. Columba remained a major figure into the fourteenth century and a new foundation was endowed by William I (r. 1165–1214) at Arbroath Abbey. In Strathclyde the most important saint was St Kentigern, whose cult (under the pet name St. Mungo) became focused in Glasgow. In Lothian it was St Cuthbert, whose relics were carried across the Northumbria after Lindisfarne was sacked by the Vikings before being installed in Durham Cathedral. After his martyrdom around 1115, a cult emerged in Orkney, Shetland and northern Scotland around Magnus Erlendsson, Earl of Orkney. The cult of St Andrew was established on the east coast at Kilrymont by the Pictish kings as early as the eighth century. The shrine, which from the twelfth century was said to have contained the relics of the saint brought to Scotland by Saint Regulus. By the twelfth century it had become known simply as St. Andrews and it became increasingly associated with Scottish national identity and the royal family. Queen Margaret, was canonised in 1250 and after the ceremonial transfer of her remains to Dunfermline Abbey, emerged as one of the most revered national saints. In the late Middle Ages the "international" cults, particularity those centred on the Virgin Mary and Christ, but also Saint Joseph, Saint Anne, the Three Kings and the Apostles, would become more significant in Scotland.

=== Popular religion ===
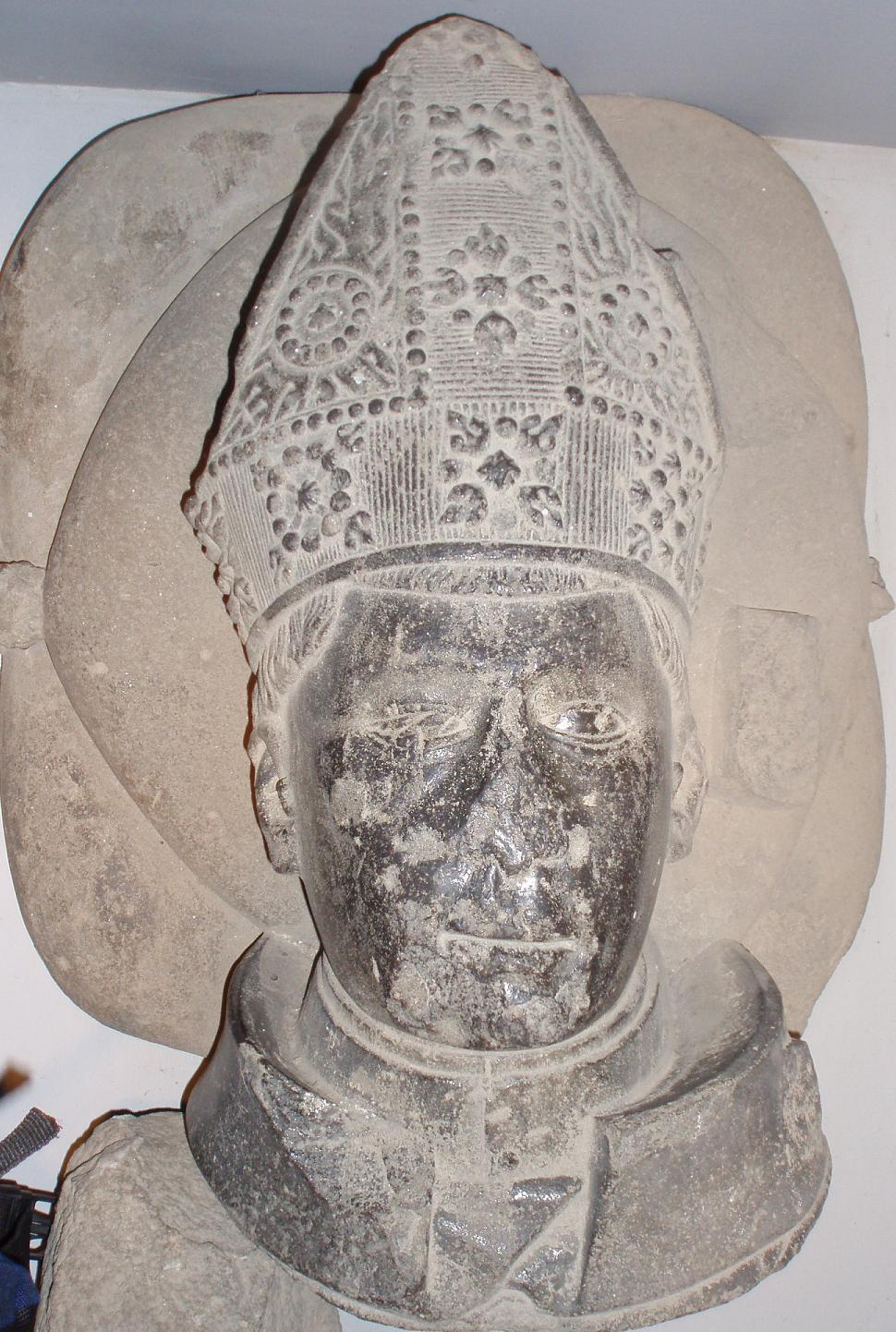
Henry Wardlaw (died 1440), Bishop of St Andrews, royal tutor and adviser, founder of The University of St Andrews and key figure in fighting Lollardy

Traditional Protestant historiography tended to stress the corruption and unpopularity of the late medieval Scottish church, but more recent research has indicated the ways in which it met the spiritual needs of different social groups. Historians have discerned a decline of monasticism in this period, with many religious houses keeping smaller numbers of monks, and those remaining often abandoning communal living for a more individual and secular lifestyle. New monastic endowments from the nobility also declined in the fifteenth century. In contrast, the burghs saw the flourishing of mendicant orders of friars in the later fifteenth century, who placed an emphasis on preaching and ministering to the population. The order of Observant Friars were organised as a Scottish province from 1467 and the older Franciscans and Dominicans were recognised as separate provinces in the 1480s. In most burghs, in contrast to English towns where churches tended to proliferate, there was usually only one parish church, but as the doctrine of Purgatory gained in importance in the period, the number of chapelries, priests and masses for the dead within them grew rapidly. The number of altars to saints also grew dramatically, with St. Mary's in Dundee having perhaps 48 and St Giles' in Edinburgh over 50, as did the number of saints celebrated in Scotland, with about 90 being added to the missal used in St Nicholas church in Aberdeen. New cults of devotion connected with Jesus and the Virgin Mary also began to reach Scotland in the fifteenth century, including The Five Wounds, The Holy Blood and The Holy Name of Jesus and new feasts including The Presentation, The Visitation and Mary of the Snows. There were further attempts to differentiate Scottish liturgical practice from that in England, with a printing press established under royal patent in 1507 in order to replace the English Sarum Use for services. Heresy, in the form of Lollardry, began to reach Scotland from England and Bohemia in the early fifteenth century, but despite evidence of a number of burnings and some apparent support for its anti-sacramental elements, it probably remained a relatively small movement.

== Early modern ==
=== Reformation ===
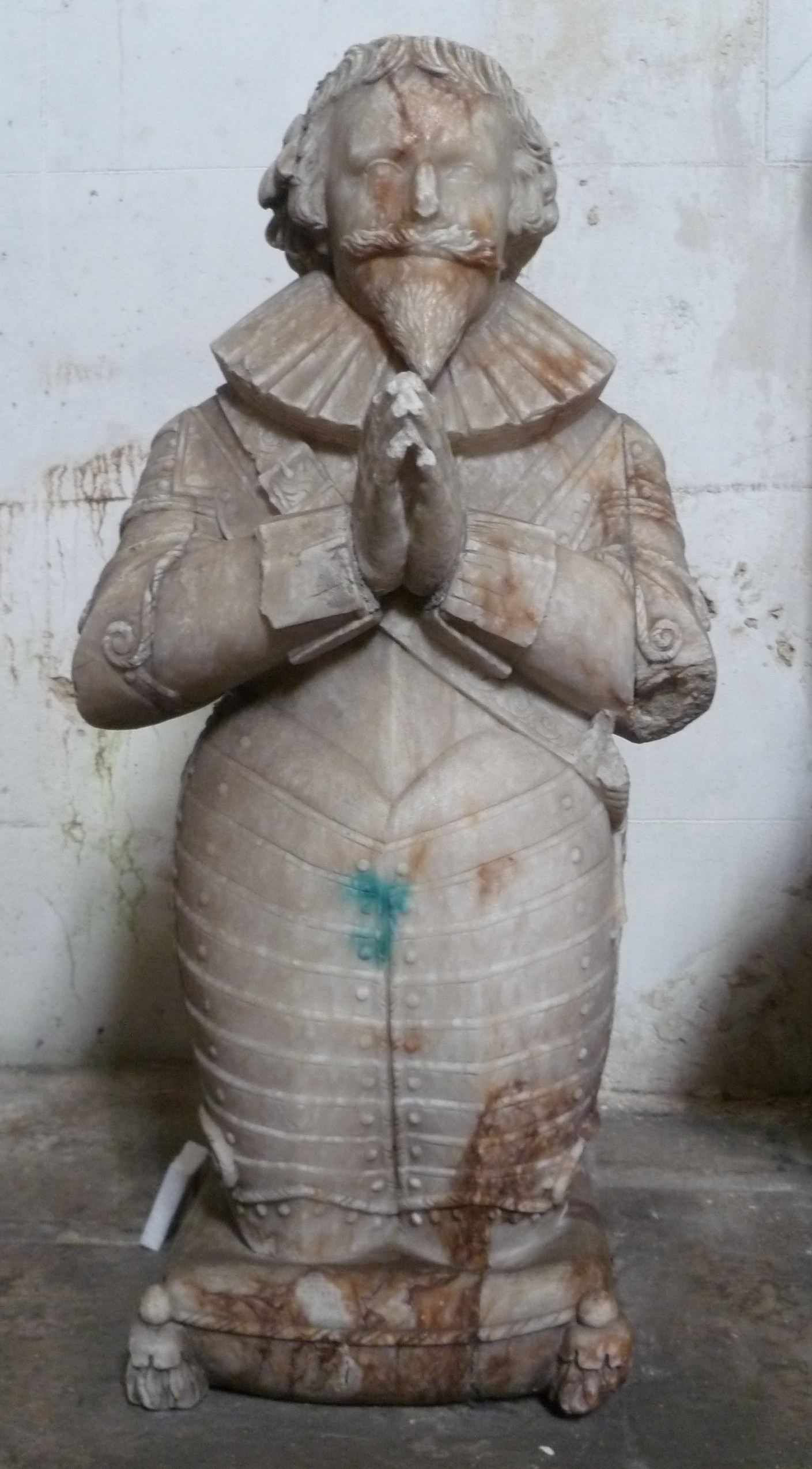
Scottish Protestant at prayer. A statue in Culross Abbey

==== Early Protestantism ====
During the sixteenth century, Scotland underwent a Protestant Reformation that created a predominately Calvinist national kirk, which was strongly Presbyterian in outlook, severely reducing the powers of bishops, although not abolishing them. In the earlier part of the century, the teachings of first Martin Luther and then John Calvin began to influence Scotland, particularly through Scottish scholars who had visited continental and English universities and who had often trained in the Catholic priesthood. English influence was also more direct, supplying books and distributing Bibles and Protestant literature in the Lowlands when they invaded in 1547. Particularly important was the work of the Lutheran Scot Patrick Hamilton. His execution with other Protestant preachers in 1528, and of the Zwingli-influenced George Wishart in 1546, who was burnt at the stake in St. Andrews on the orders of Cardinal Beaton, did nothing to stem the growth of these ideas. Wishart's supporters, who included a number of Fife lairds, assassinated Beaton soon after and seized St. Andrews Castle, which they held for a year before they were defeated with the help of French forces. The survivors, including chaplain John Knox, being condemned to be galley slaves, helping to create resentment of the French and martyrs for the Protestant cause.

==== Reformation settlement ====
Limited toleration and the influence of exiled Scots and Protestants in other countries, led to the expansion of Protestantism, with a group of lairds declaring themselves Lords of the Congregation in 1557 and representing their interests politically. The collapse of the French alliance and English intervention in 1560 meant that a relatively small, but highly influential, group of Protestants were in a position to impose reform on the Scottish church. A confession of faith, rejecting papal jurisdiction and the mass, was adopted by Parliament in 1560, while the young Mary, Queen of Scots, was still in France. Knox, having escaped the galleys and spent time in Geneva, where he became a follower of Calvin, emerged as the most significant figure. The Calvinism of the reformers led by Knox resulted in a settlement that adopted a Presbyterian system and rejected most of the elaborate trappings of the medieval church. By the 1590s Scotland was organized into about fifty presbyteries with about twenty ministers in each. Above them stood a dozen or so synods and at the apex the general assembly. This gave considerable power within the new kirk to local lairds (landowners), who often had control over the appointment of the clergy, and resulting in widespread, but generally orderly, iconoclasm. At this point the majority of the population was probably still Catholic in persuasion and the kirk would find it difficult to penetrate the Highlands and Islands, but began a gradual process of conversion and consolidation that, compared with reformations elsewhere, was conducted with relatively little persecution.

==== James VI ====
The reign of the Catholic Mary, Queen of Scots eventually ended in civil war, deposition, imprisonment and execution in England. Her infant son James VI was crowned King of Scots in 1567. He was brought up as a Protestant, while the country was run by a series of regents. After he asserted his personal rule from 1583 he favoured doctrinal Calvinism, but also episcopacy. His inheritance of the English crown led to rule via the Privy Council from London. He also increasingly controlled the meetings of the Scottish General Assembly and increased the number and powers of the Scottish bishops. In 1618, he held a General Assembly and pushed through Five Articles, which included practices that had been retained in England, but largely abolished in Scotland, most controversially kneeling for the reception of communion. Although ratified, they created widespread opposition and resentment and were seen by many as a step back to Catholic practice.

=== Seventeenth century ===
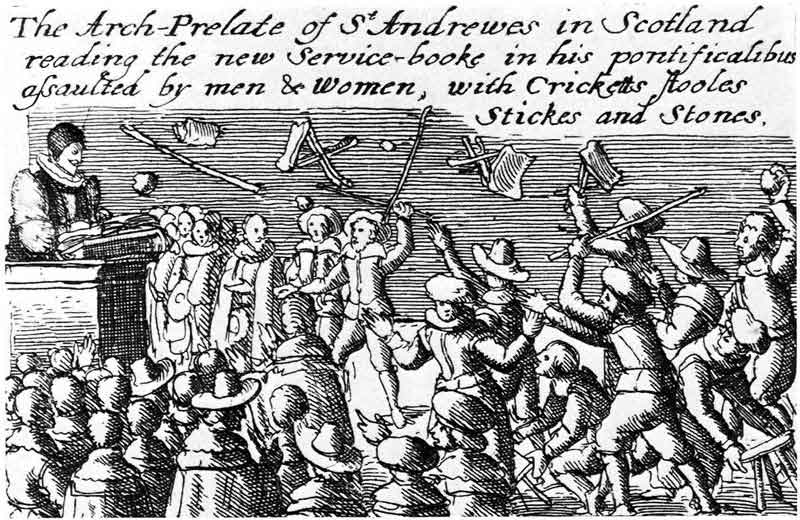
The riots set off by Jenny Geddes in St Giles Cathedral that sparked off the Bishops' Wars.

==== Covenanters ====
James VI was succeeded by his son Charles I in 1625. The father had divided his opponents; the son united them. Charles relied heavily on the bishops, particularly John Spottiswood, Archbishop of St. Andrews, eventually making him chancellor. At the beginning of his reign, Charles' revocation of alienated lands since 1542 helped secure the finances of the kirk, but it threatened the holdings of the nobility who had gained from the Reformation settlement. In 1635, without reference to a general assembly of the Parliament, the king authorised a book of canons that made him head of the Church, ordained an unpopular ritual and enforced the use of a new liturgy. When the liturgy emerged in 1637 it was seen as an English-style Prayer Book, resulting in anger and widespread rioting, said to have been set off with the throwing of a stool by one Jenny Geddes during a service in St Giles Cathedral. The Protestant nobility put themselves at the head of the popular opposition. Representatives of various sections of Scottish society drew up the National Covenant on 28 February 1638, objecting to the King's liturgical innovations. The king's supporters were unable to suppress the rebellion and the king refused to compromise. In December 1638 at a meeting of the General Assembly in Glasgow, the Scottish bishops were formally expelled from the Church, which was then established on a full Presbyterian basis.

==== War of Three Kingdoms ====
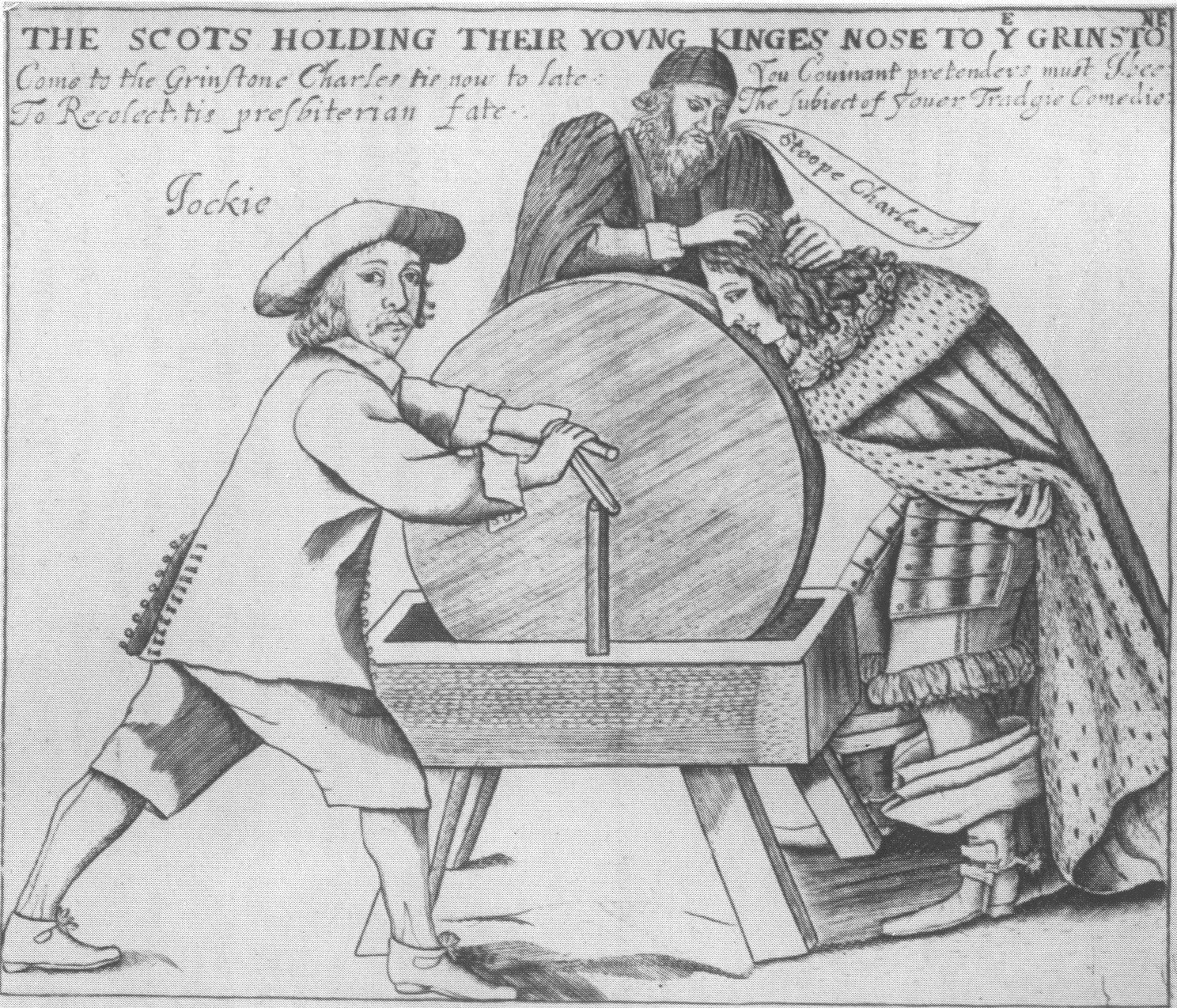
The Scots holding the young Charles II's nose to the grindstone of the Engagement, by which he agreed to the Covenants

The Scots and the king both assembled armies and after two Bishop's Wars in 1639 and 1640 the Scots emerged the victors. Charles capitulated, leaving the Covenanters in independent control of the country. He was forced to recall the English Parliament, resulting in the outbreak of the English Civil War in 1642. The Covenanters sided with Parliament and in 1643 they entered into a Solemn League and Covenant, guaranteeing the Scottish Church settlement and promising further reform in England. By 1646 a Royalist campaign in the Highlands and the Royalists in England had been defeated and the king had surrendered. Relations with the English Parliament and the increasingly independent English New Model Army became strained and control of Scotland fell to those willing to compromise with the king. The resulting Engagement with the King led to a Second Civil War and a defeat for a Scottish invading army at Battle of Preston, by the New Model Army led by Oliver Cromwell. After the coup of the Whiggamore Raid, the Kirk Party regained control in Scotland.

==== Commonwealth ====
After the execution of the king in January 1649 England was declared a commonwealth and the Scots declared his son king as Charles II. The English responded with an armed invasion and after defeats for the Scots at Dunbar in 1650 and Worcester in 1651, the English occupied the country in 1652 and Scotland was declared part of the Commonwealth. The Kirk became deeply divided, partly in the search for scapegoats for defeat. Different factions and tendencies produced rival resolutions and protests, which gave their names to the two major parties as Resolutioners, who were willing to make an accommodation with royalism, and more hard line Protesters who wished to purge the Kirk of such associations. Subsequently, the divide between rival camps became almost irrevocable. The regime accepted Presbyterianism as a valid system, but did not accept that it was the only legitimate form of church organisation and the Kirk functioned much as before. Toleration, did not extend to Episcopalians and Catholics, but if they did not call attention to themselves they were largely left alone.

==== Restoration ====
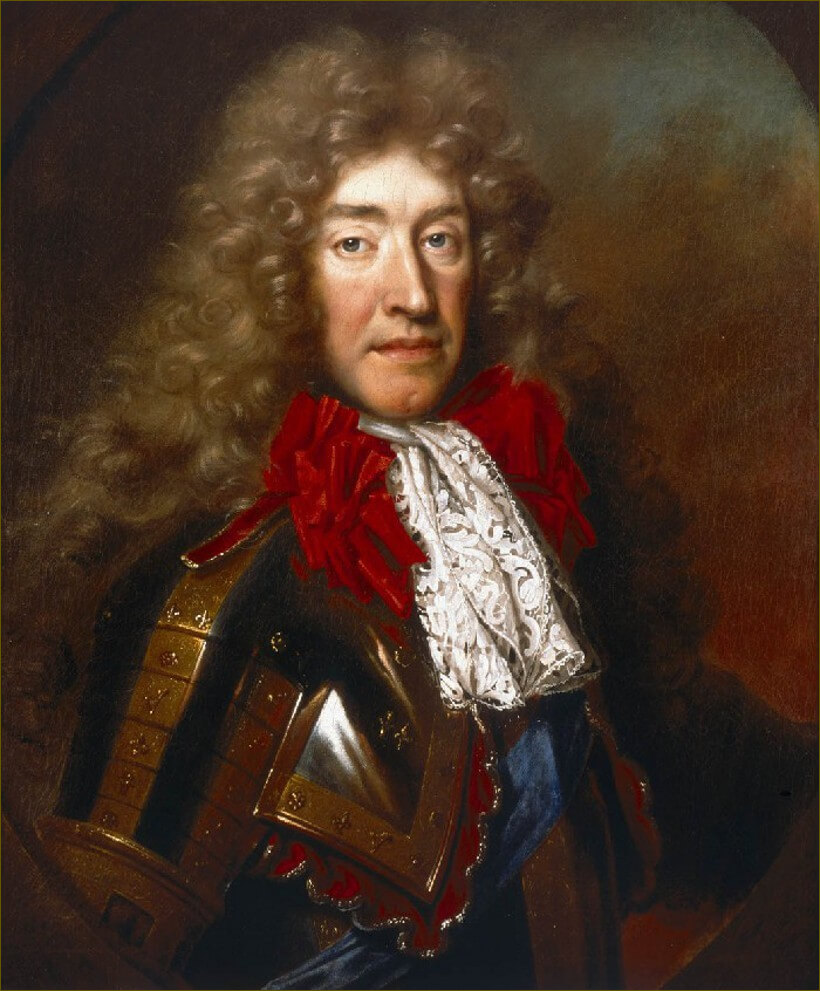
James VII of Scotland (and II of England), who was deposed for his Catholicism in 1688

After the Restoration of the Monarchy in 1660, Scotland regained its kirk, but also the bishops. Legislation was revoked back to 1633, removing the Covenanter gains of the Bishops' Wars, but the discipline of kirk sessions, presbyteries and synods were renewed. The reintroduction of episcopacy was a source of particular trouble in the south-west of the country, an area with strong Presbyterian sympathies. Abandoning the official church, many of the people here began to attend illegal field assemblies led by excluded ministers, known as conventicles. Official attempts to suppress these led to a rising in 1679, defeated by James, Duke of Monmouth, the King's illegitimate son, at the Battle of Bothwell Bridge. In the early 1680s a more intense phase of persecution began, in what was later to be known in Protestant historiography as "the Killing Time", with dissenters summarily executed by the dragoons of James Graham, Laird of Claverhouse or sentenced to transportation or death by Sir George Mackenzie, the Lord Advocate.

==== Glorious Revolution ====
Charles died in 1685 and his brother succeeded him as James VII of Scotland (and II of England). James put Catholics in key positions in the government and even attendance at a conventicle was made punishable by death. He disregarded parliament, purged the Council and forced through religious toleration to Roman Catholics, alienating his Protestant subjects. It was believed that the king would be succeeded by his daughter Mary, a Protestant and the wife of William of Orange, Stadtholder of the Netherlands, but when in 1688, James produced a male heir, James Francis Edward Stuart, it was clear that his policies would outlive him. An invitation by seven leading Englishmen led William to land in England with 40,000 men, and James fled, leading to the almost bloodless "Glorious Revolution". The final settlement restored Presbyterianism in Scotland and abolished the bishops, who had generally supported James. However, William, who was more tolerant than the kirk tended to be, passed acts restoring the Episcopalian clergy excluded after the Revolution.

== Modern ==
=== Eighteenth century ===
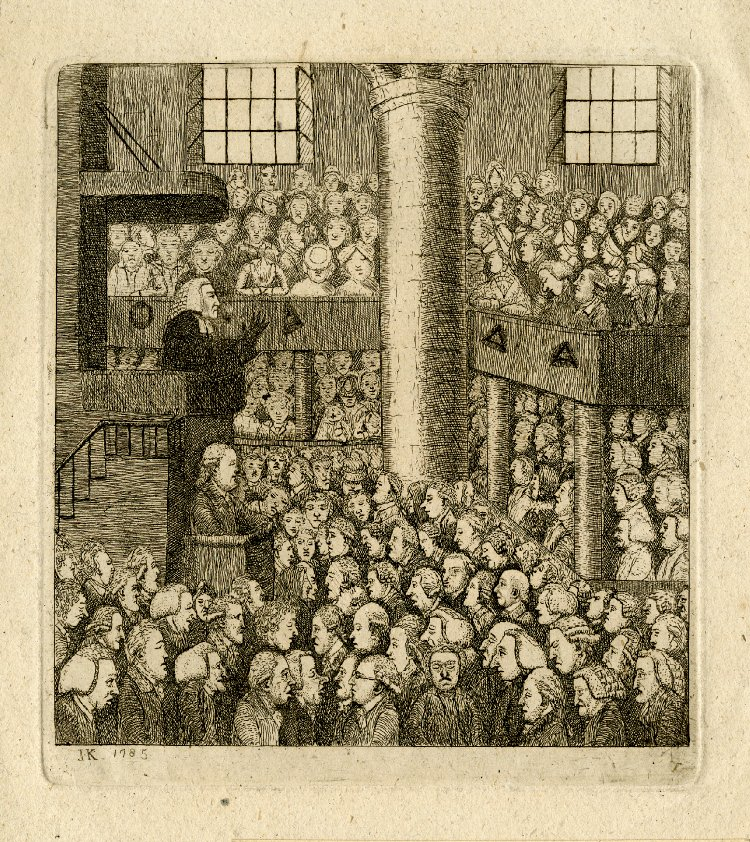
Scottish minister and his congregation, c.1750

The late eighteenth century saw the beginnings of a fragmentation of the Church of Scotland that had been created in the Reformation. These fractures were prompted by issues of government and patronage, but reflected a wider division between the Evangelicals and the Moderate Party over fears of fanaticism by the former and the acceptance of Enlightenment ideas by the latter. The legal right of lay patrons to present clergymen of their choice to local ecclesiastical livings led to minor schisms from the church. The first in 1733, known as the First Secession and headed by figures including Ebenezer Erskine, led to the creation of a series of secessionist churches. The second in 1761 lead to the foundation of the independent Relief Church. These churches gained strength in the Evangelical Revival of the later eighteenth century.

Long after the triumph of the Church of Scotland in the Lowlands, Highlanders and Islanders clung to an old-fashioned Christianity infused with animistic folk beliefs and practices. The remoteness of the region and the lack of a Gaelic-speaking clergy undermined the missionary efforts of the established church. The later eighteenth century saw some success, owing to the efforts of the SSPCK missionaries and to the disruption of traditional society. Catholicism had been reduced to the fringes of the country, particularly the Gaelic-speaking areas of the Highlands and Islands. Conditions also grew worse for Catholics after the Jacobite rebellions and Catholicism was reduced to little more than a poorly-run mission. Also important was Episcopalianism, which had retained supporters through the civil wars and changes of regime in the seventeenth century. Since most Episcopalians had given their support to the Jacobite rebellions in the early eighteenth century, they also suffered a decline in fortunes.

=== Nineteenth century ===
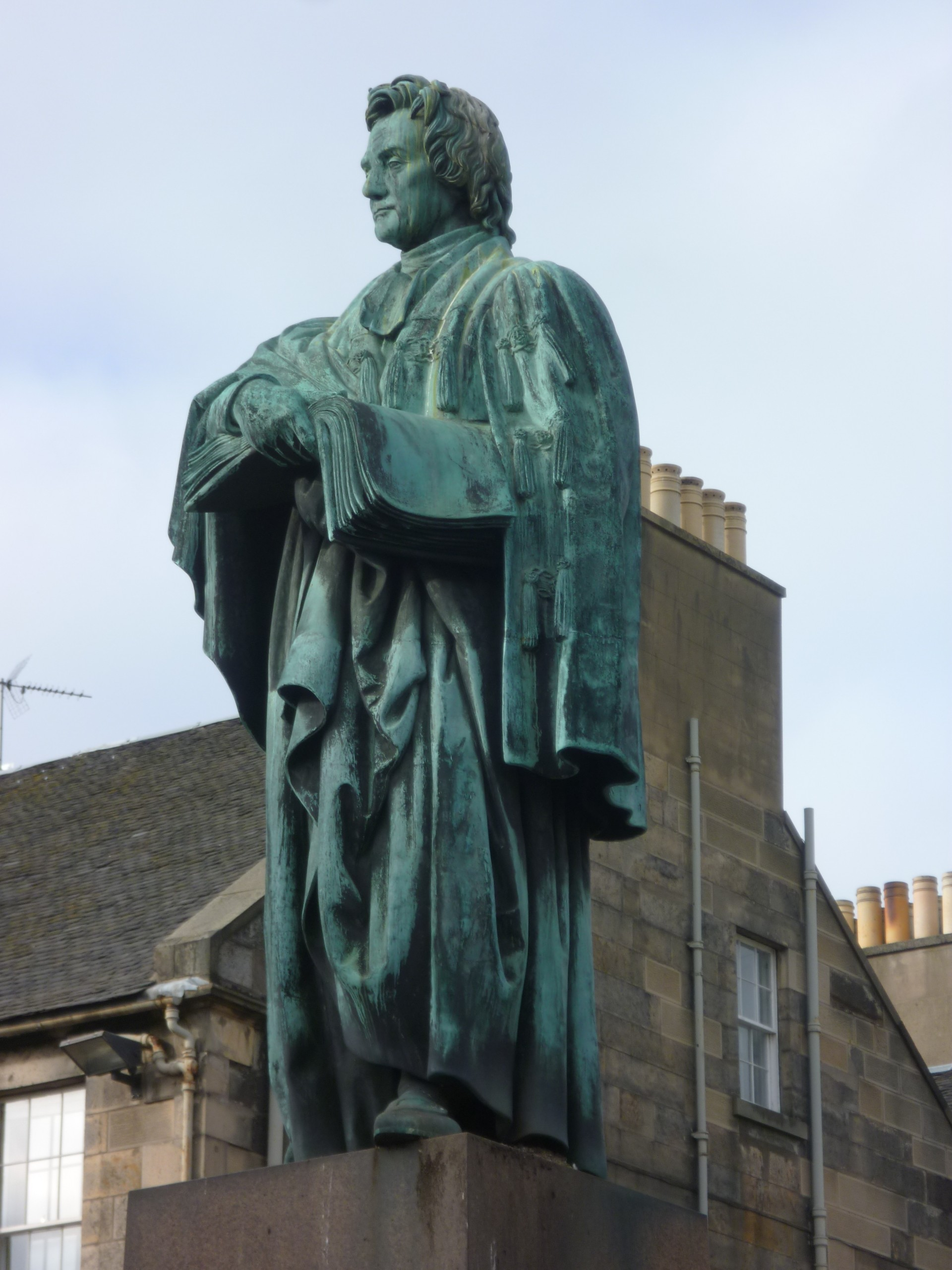
Thomas Chalmers statue, Edinburgh

After prolonged years of struggle, in 1834 the Evangelicals gained control of the General Assembly and passed the Veto Act, which allowed congregations to reject unwanted "intrusive" presentations to livings by patrons. The following "Ten Years' Conflict" of legal and political wrangling ended in defeat for the non-intrusionists in the civil courts. The result was a schism from the church by some of the non-intrusionists led by Dr Thomas Chalmers known as the Great Disruption of 1843. Roughly a third of the clergy, mainly from the North and Highlands, formed the separate Free Church of Scotland. The evangelical Free Churches, which were more accepting of Gaelic language and culture, grew rapidly in the Highlands and Islands, appealing much more strongly than did the established church. Chalmers's ideas shaped the breakaway group. He stressed a social vision that revived and preserved Scotland's communal traditions at a time of strain on the social fabric of the country. Chalmers's idealized small equalitarian, kirk-based, self-contained communities that recognized the individuality of their members and the need for cooperation. That vision also affected the mainstream Presbyterian churches, and by the 1870s it had been assimilated by the established Church of Scotland. Chalmers's ideals demonstrated that the church was concerned with the problems of urban society, and they represented a real attempt to overcome the social fragmentation that took place in industrial towns and cities.

In the late nineteenth century, the major debates were between fundamentalist Calvinists and theological liberals, who rejected a literal interpretation of the Bible. This resulted in a further split in the Free Church as the rigid Calvinists broke away to form the Free Presbyterian Church in 1893. There were, however, also moves towards reunion, beginning with the unification of some secessionist churches into the United Secession Church in 1820, which united with the Relief Church in 1847 to form the United Presbyterian Church, which in turn joined with the Free Church in 1900 to form the United Free Church of Scotland. The removal of legislation on lay patronage would allow the majority of the Free Church to rejoin Church of Scotland in 1929. The schisms left small denominations including the Free Presbyterians and a remnant that had not merged in 1900 as the Free Church.

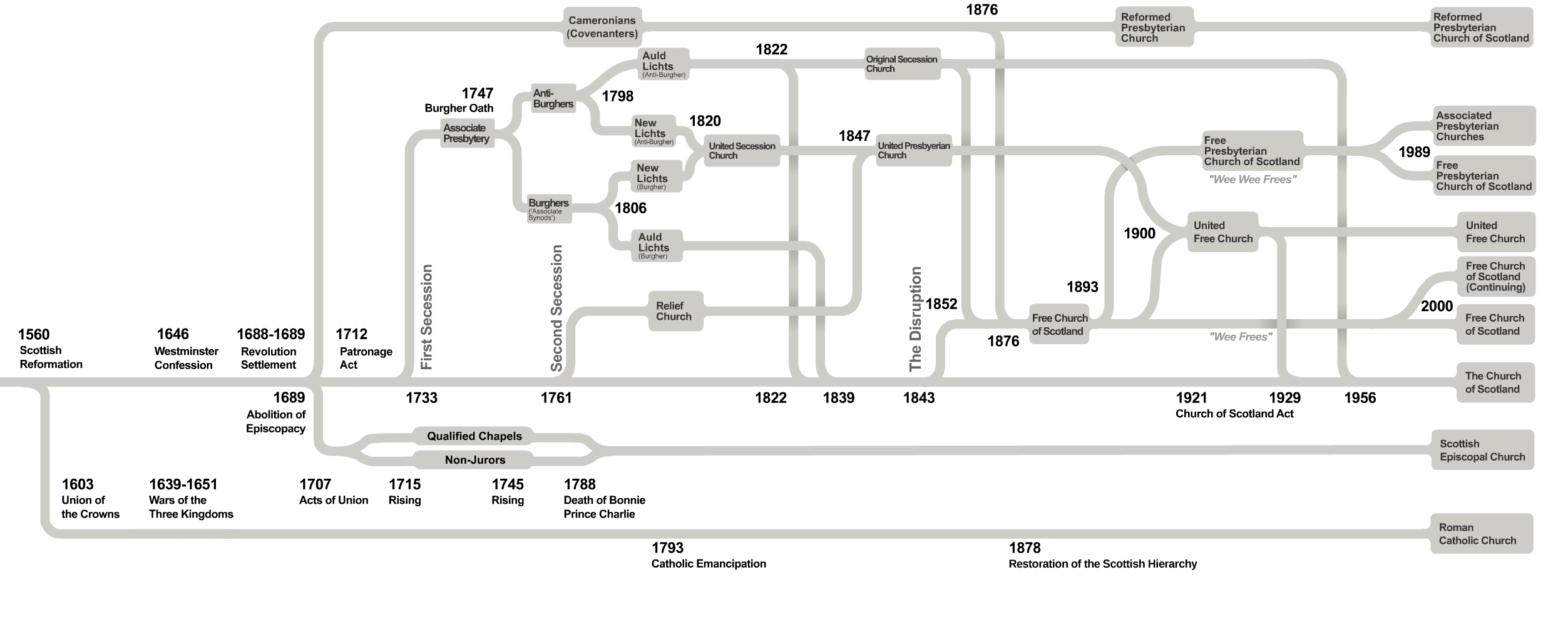
Timeline diagram showing the lineage of Scottish churches with various schisms and complex reunifications between 1560 and the present day

Catholic Emancipation in 1829 and the influx of large numbers of Irish immigrants, particularly after the famine years of the late 1840s, principally to the growing lowland centres like Glasgow, led to a transformation in the fortunes of Catholicism. In 1878, despite opposition, a Roman Catholic ecclesiastical hierarchy was restored to the country, and Catholicism became a significant denomination within Scotland. Episcopalianism also revived in the nineteenth century as the issue of succession receded, becoming established as the Scottish Episcopal Church in 1804, as an autonomous organisation in communion with the Church of England. Baptist, Congregationalist and Methodist churches had appeared in Scotland in the 18th, but did not begin significant growth until the nineteenth century, partly because more radical and evangelical traditions already existed within the Church of Scotland and the free churches. From 1879, they were joined by the evangelical revivalism of the Salvation Army, which attempted to make major inroads in the growing urban centres.

=== Contemporary Christianity ===
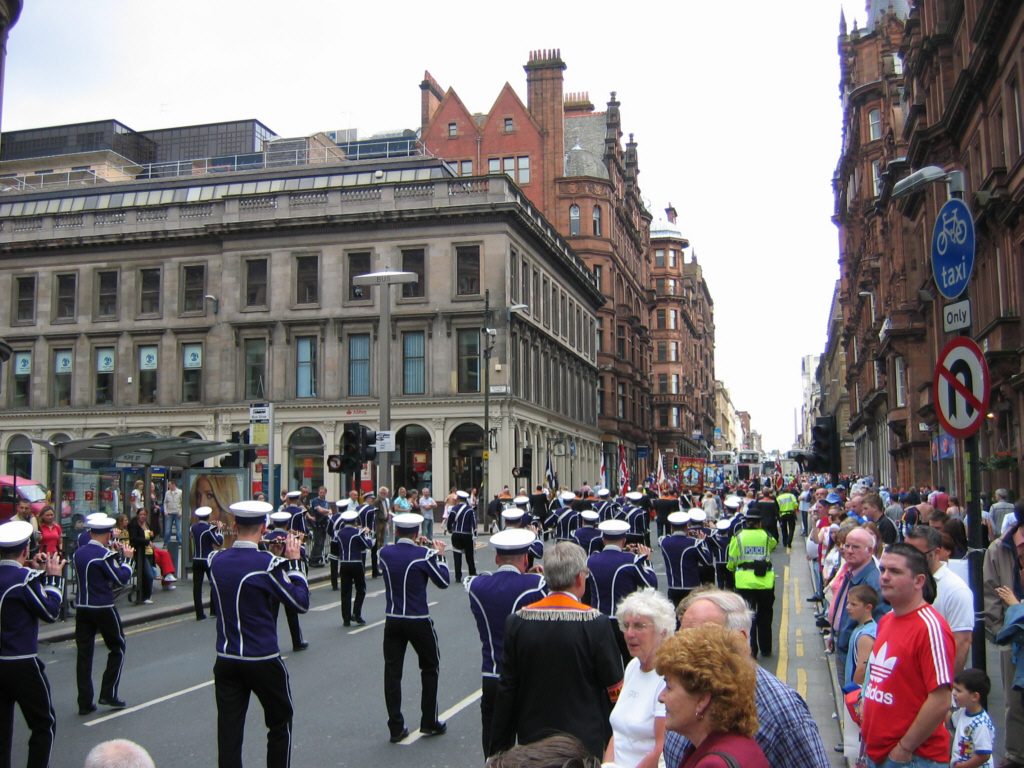
An Orange Order march in Glasgow

In the twentieth century, existing Christian denominations were joined by other organisations, including the Brethren and Pentecostal churches. Although some denominations thrived, after World War II there was a steady overall decline in church attendance and resulting church closures for most denominations. In the 2001 census 42.4 per cent of the population identified with the Church of Scotland, 15.9 per cent with Catholicism and 6.8 with other forms of Christianity, making up roughly 65 per cent of the population (compared with 72 per cent for the UK as a whole). Other denominations in Scotland include the Jehovah's Witnesses, Methodists, the Congregationalists, and the Church of Jesus Christ of Latter-day Saints. 5.5 per cent did not state a religion. There were 27.5 per cent who stated that they had no religion (which compares with 15.5 per cent in the UK overall). Other more recent studies suggest that those not identifying with a denomination or who see themselves as non-religious may be much higher at between 42 and 56 per cent, depending on the form of question asked.

The Church of Scotland, is recognised (under the Church of Scotland Act 1921) as the national church. It is not subject to state control, and the monarch (currently King Charles III) is an ordinary member of the Church of Scotland, and is represented at the General Assembly by their Lord High Commissioner. For much of the twentieth century significant numbers of Catholics emigrated to Scotland from Italy, Lithuania and Poland. However, the church has been affected by the general decline in churchgoing. Between 1994 and 2002 Roman Catholic attendance in Scotland declined 19%, to just over 200,000. By 2008, The Bishops' Conference of Scotland estimated that 184,283 attended mass regularly in 2008 – 3.6% of Scotland's population at that time. Some parts of Scotland (particularly the West Central Belt around Glasgow) have experienced problems caused by sectarianism. While football rivalry between Protestant and Catholic clubs in most of Scotland, the traditionally Roman Catholic team, Celtic, and the traditionally Protestant team, Rangers have retained sectarian identities. Celtic have employed Protestant players and managers, but Rangers have a tradition of not recruiting Catholics.

== Notes and references ==
=== References ===
- Brown, Callum G. The Social History of Religion in Scotland since 1730 (Methuen, 1987)
- Clancy, Thomas Owen, "Church institutions: early medieval" in Lynch (2001).
- Clancy, Thomas Owen, "Scotland, the 'Nennian' Recension of the Historia Brittonum and the Libor Bretnach in Simon Taylor (ed.), Kings, clerics and chronicles in Scotland 500–1297. Four Courts, Dublin, 2000. ISBN 1-85182-516-9
- Clancy, Thomas Owen, "Nechtan son of Derile" in Lynch (2001).
- Clancy, Thomas Owen, "Columba, Adomnán and the Cult of Saints in Scotland" in Broun & Clancy (1999).
- Cross, F.L. and Livingstone, E.A. (eds), Scotland, Christianity in in "The Oxford Dictionary of the Christian Church", pp. 1471–1473. Oxford University Press, Oxford, 1997. ISBN 0-19-211655-X
- Foster, Sally M., Picts, Gaels, and Scots: Early Historic Scotland. Batsford, London, 2004. ISBN 0-7134-8874-3
- Hillis, Peter, The Barony of Glasgow, A Window onto Church and People in Nineteenth Century Scotland, Dunedin Academic Press, 2007.
- Markus, Fr. Gilbert, O.P., "Religious life: early medieval" in Lynch (2001).
- Markus, Fr. Gilbert, O.P., "Conversion to Christianity" in Lynch (2001).
- Mechie, S. The Church and Scottish social development, 1780–1870 (1960).
- Piggott, Charles A. "A geography of religion in Scotland." The Scottish Geographical Magazine 96.3 (1980): 130–140.
- Taylor, Simon, "Seventh-century Iona abbots in Scottish place-names" in Broun & Clancy (1999).
