= Battle of Stirling =

Battle of Stirling may refer to:

- Battle of Stirling Bridge, a 1297 battle of the First War of Scottish Independence
- Battle of Stirling (1648), a battle of the Scottish Civil War
