= Whiggamore Raid =

March on Edinburgh by supporters of the Kirk faction of the Covenanters

- Part of the Scottish Civil War
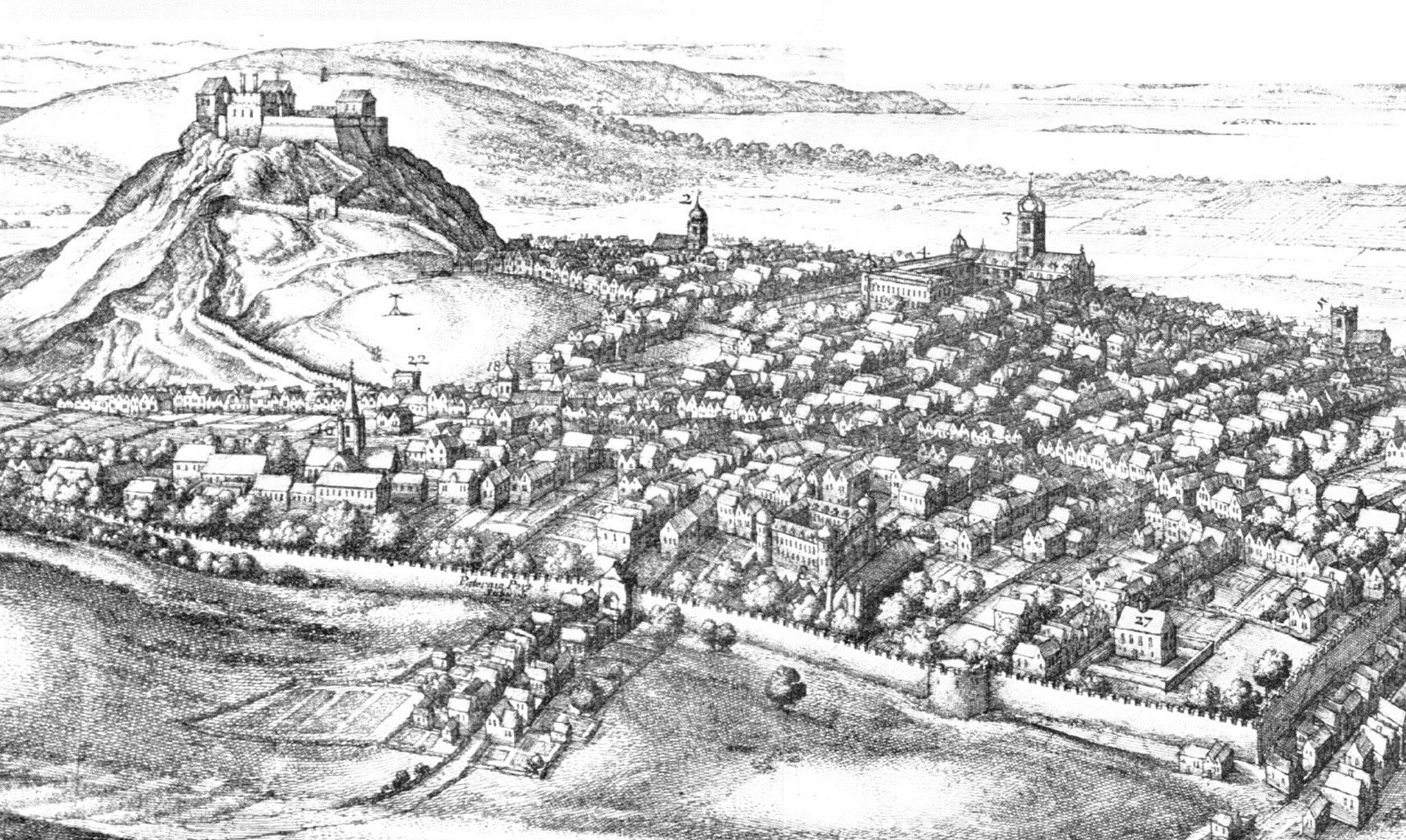
- Engraving of Edinburgh by Wenceslaus Hollar, 1670
Date	September 1648
Location	Edinburgh, Scotland
Result	Edinburgh taken by Kirk Party; Committee of Estates relocates to Stirling; Ensuing Battle of Stirling

Belligerents
Kirk Party	(Kingdom of Scotland) Committee of Estates: (Kingdom of Scotland) Engagers

Commanders and leaders
The Earl of Eglinton; The Earl of Leven	(Kingdom of Scotland) Earl of Loudoun (Lord Chancellor) (surrendered)

The Whiggamore Raid (or "March of the Whiggamores") was a march on Edinburgh by supporters of the Kirk faction of the Covenanters to take power from the Engagers whose army had recently been defeated by the English New Model Army at the Battle of Preston (1648). Whiggamores (later shortened to Whigs)—a term most likely originating from the Scots for "mare drivers"—became a nickname for the Kirk party who were against the Engagement with King Charles I.

== Prelude ==
After defeating the Duke of Hamilton at the Battle of Preston (17–19 August 1648), Oliver Cromwell had still to deal with the forces under Sir George Monro and Sir Philip Musgrave, making in all about 7,000 men. Monro, however, not being on good terms with his English allies, made his way through Durham to the Anglo-Scottish border, and, crossing the Tweed into Scotland on 8 September 1648, left Musgrave (who had retreated into Appleby and capitulated on 9 October 1648) to his fate. The Earl of Lanark and the Committee of Estates, anxious to hold Cromwell back from carrying the pursuit across the Border, gave orders that no Englishman who had been in arms in conjunction with Hamilton or Monro should be admitted into Scotland. By this time Cromwell was at Durham pushing steadily northwards. He soon learnt that he would have potent allies in Scotland itself.

== Raid ==
Archibald Campbell, 1st Marquess of Argyll had seen in Hamilton's defeat at Preston an opportunity for recovering the power that he had lost. Presbyterian ministers preached in his favour from one end of the country to the other. Robert, Lord Eglinton roused the stern Presbyterians of the west, who were known in Edinburgh as Whiggamores (reportedly, from the cry of "Whiggam" with which they encouraged their horses). The crowd of half-armed peasants who followed in Alexander, Earl of Eglinton's train, and to whose incursion the name of the Whiggamore Raid was given, had the popular feeling behind them. They easily took possession of Edinburgh, where old Leven secured the castle for them. David Leslie, who had refused to fight for Hamilton, placed his sword at the disposal of Argyll, and the Chancellor Loudoun, who had been long hesitating between the two parties, now openly deserted the Committee of Estates and being himself a Campbell brought what authority he possessed to the support of the head of his family (the Marquess of Argyll).

== Aftermath ==
The Committee of Estates, thrust out of Edinburgh, took refuge under Monro's protection at Stirling, where they found themselves again opposed by the Whiggamores, and by the followers of the few Lowland noblemen who adopted their cause. There was a skirmish at Stirling on 12 September 1648. Lanark and the officers of Monro's army argued strongly in favour of fighting the insurgents, believing that it would be easy to gain a victory over their heterogeneous force. The members of the Committee of Estates were, however, too conscious of their political isolation to approve of such a course, so, with both sides worried that the English Parliamentary forces were going to take advantage of Scottish disunity and invade Scotland, they promptly opened negotiations. On 26 September the Committee of Estates abandoned all claim to the government of the country. It was agreed that Sir George Monro's soldiers should return to Ireland, and that all persons who had taken part in the defence of the Engagement should resign whatever offices and places of trust they held in Scotland.

== See also ==
- Liberal Party (UK)
- Patriot Whigs or Patriot Party
- Radical Whigs
