= Solemn League and Covenant =

1643 agreement between Scottish Covenanters and English Parliamentarians

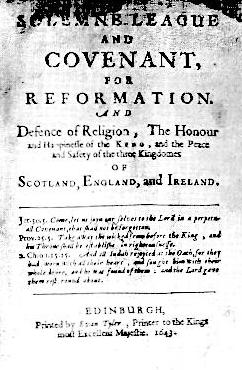
Title page of the Solemn League and Covenant.

The Solemn League and Covenant was an agreement between the Scottish Covenanters and the leaders of the English Parliamentarians in 1643 during the First English Civil War, a theatre of conflict in the Wars of the Three Kingdoms. On 17 August 1643, the Church of Scotland (the Kirk) accepted it and on 25 September 1643 so did the English Parliament and the Westminster Assembly.

== English Parliament (First Civil War) ==
At the time, the Protestant leaders of the English Parliament were in conflict with King Charles I. Fearing Irish Catholic troops could join the Royalist army, Parliament requested the aid of the Scots. The Presbyterian Covenanters promised their aid, on condition that the Scottish system of church government was adopted in England. This was acceptable to the majority of the English Long Parliament, as many MPs were Presbyterians, while others preferred allying with the Scots rather than losing the Civil War.

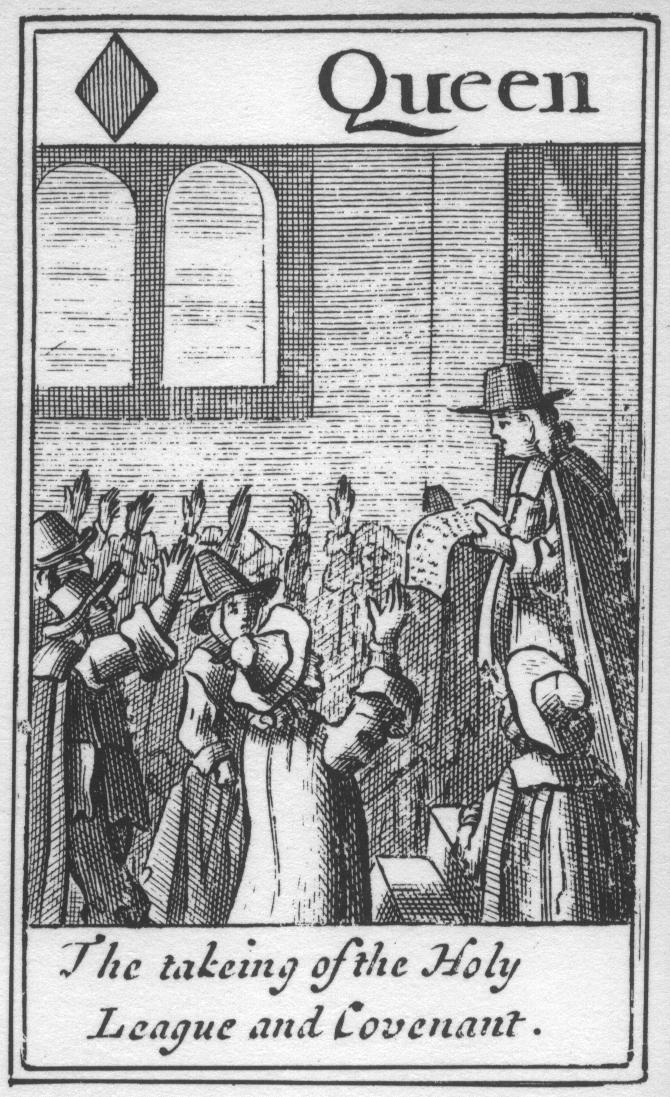
A 17th-century playing card shows English Puritans taking the Covenant

After some haggling a document called "The Solemn League and Covenant" was drawn up. This was in effect a treaty between the English parliament and its Scottish counterpart for the preservation of the reformed religion in Scotland, the reformation of religion in England and Ireland "according to the word of God and the example of the best reformed churches", and the "extirpation of popery [and] prelacy". It did not explicitly mention Presbyterianism, and included some ambiguous formulations which left the door open to the English Independents, another strong faction on the English Parliamentary side, particularly in the parliamentary armies. It was subscribed to by many in England, Scotland, and Ireland, approved by the English Long Parliament, and, with some slight modifications, by the Westminster Assembly of Divines.

However, not all those on the English Parliamentarian side were happy with this arrangement and some, like John Lilburne, chose to leave the parliamentary armies rather than take the oath prescribed in the Act enforcing the Solemn League and Covenant.

The agreement meant that the Covenanters sent another army south to England to fight on the Parliamentarian side in the First English Civil War. When the Scots army entered England by invitation of the English Parliament in January 1644 the Parliamentary Committee of Safety was replaced by an ad hoc committee representative of both kingdoms which, by parliamentary ordinance of 16 February, was formally constituted the Committee of Both Kingdoms. Its object was the management of peace overtures to, or making war on, King Charles I. The Scots withdrew from the committee after the end of the First Civil War, although it continued to sit and from then on was known as the Derby House Committee (as it sat in Derby House in London).

== Engagement and Charles I (Second Civil War) ==
After the Royalists had lost the First Civil War, Charles I was able to enter into an "Engagement" with the majority of the Covenanters in which they agreed to support him in the Second English Civil War against their mutual enemy the English Independents, in return for Charles imposing Presbyterianism for three years on England. In 1648 the Royalists and the Covenanters were defeated at the Battle of Preston, and Charles was executed in January 1649.

== Charles II (Third Civil War) ==
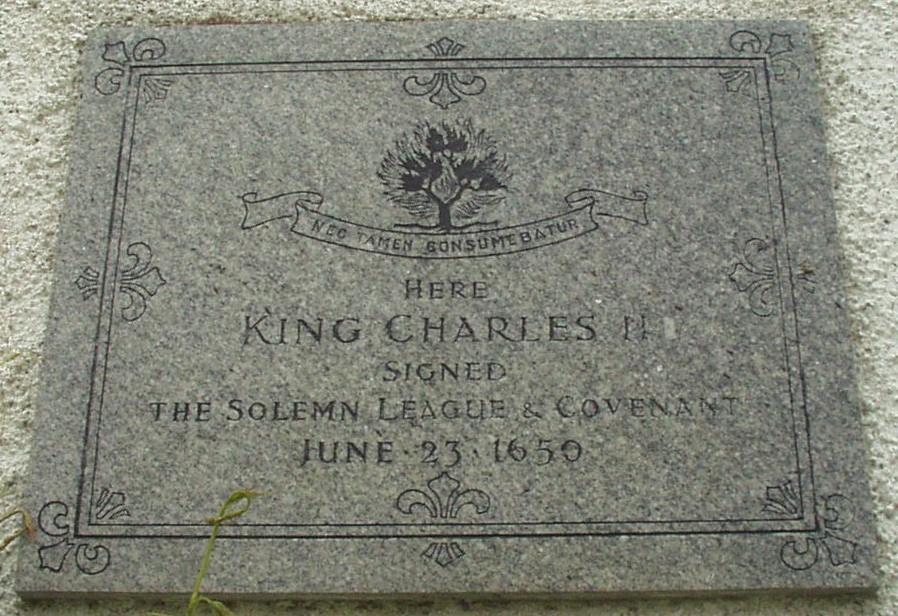
Plaque marking the signing of the Solemn League and Covenant by Charles II.

After the Kirk Party seized power from the unsuccessful and therefore discredited Engagers, the new Scottish Covenanter government persuaded the exiled Charles II to agree to the terms of the Solemn League and Covenant in the Treaty of Breda (1650). However, the defeat of the Royalist and Scottish army at the Battle of Worcester in 1651 ended the relevance of the Solemn League and Covenant as the power of the Presbyterians was broken on both sides of the border.

== Restoration and the Sedition Act ==
After the Restoration the English Parliament passed the Sedition Act 1661, which declared that the Solemn League and Covenant was unlawful, was to be abjured by all persons holding public offices, and was to be burnt by the common hangman.

== See also ==
- Protestation Returns of 1641–1642
- List of treaties
