= Archibald Campbell, 1st Marquess of Argyll =

Governed Scotland during Wars of the Three Kingdoms

The Most Honourable The Marquess of Argyll
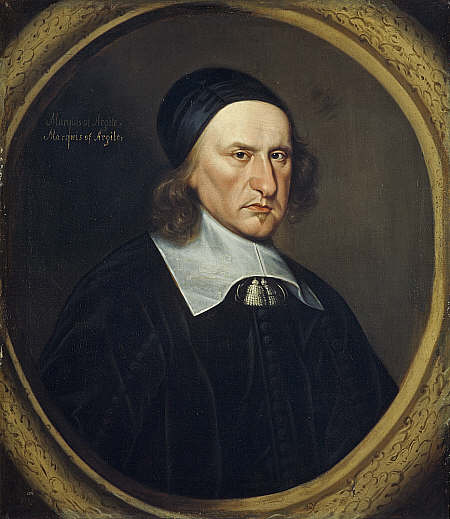
- The Marquess of Argyll, by David Scougall
- Born: 7 March 1607
- Died: 27 May 1661 (aged 54); Edinburgh, Scotland
- Cause of death: Execution
- Resting place: Kilmun Parish Church
- Citizenship: Scottish
- Education: University of St Andrews
- Occupations: Chief of Clan Campbell, politician
- Title: Marquess of Argyll, 8th Earl of Argyll, member of the Privy Council of Scotland, Assembly of Divines, parliament of 1659 for Aberdeenshire
- Spouse: Lady Margaret Douglas
- Children: Archibald Campbell, 9th Earl of Argyll; Lord Neill Campbell; Lady Anne Campbell; Lady Jean Campbell two other daughters
- Parent(s): Archibald Campbell, 7th Earl of Argyll; Agnes Douglas, Countess of Argyll

Archibald Campbell, 1st Marquess of Argyll (March 1607 – 27 May 1661) was a Scottish nobleman, politician, and peer. The de facto head of Scotland's government during most of the conflict of the 1640s and 1650s known as the Wars of the Three Kingdoms, he was the main leader of the Covenanter movement that fought for the Establishment of Presbyterianism in opposition to the preference of King Charles I and the Caroline Divines for instead establishing both High Church Anglicanism and Bishops. He is often remembered as the principal antagonist to the Royalist general James Graham, 1st Marquess of Montrose.

== Early life ==
Archibald Campbell was the eldest son of Archibald Campbell, 7th Earl of Argyll, by his first wife Agnes Douglas, daughter of William Douglas, 6th Earl of Morton, and was educated at St Andrews University, where he matriculated on 15 January 1622. He had early in life, as Lord Lorne, been entrusted with the possession of the Argyll estates when his father renounced Protestantism and took arms for Philip III of Spain; and he exercised over Clan Campbell an authority almost absolute, disposing of a force of 20,000 retainers, being, according to Baillie, "by far the most powerful subject in the kingdom".

Argyll was said to be of above average height, but slight in build. He had reddish hair, which darkened in later life – among the Highlanders he was often called "red Argyll" – and a pronounced squint. Contemporaries said he had a very charming and persuasive manner, although early in life he developed a habit of abruptly leaving the room if a conversation took a turn he did not like. Clarendon said that "his wit was pregnant, and his humour gay and pleasant, except when he liked not the company or the argument".

== In the Covenanter movement ==
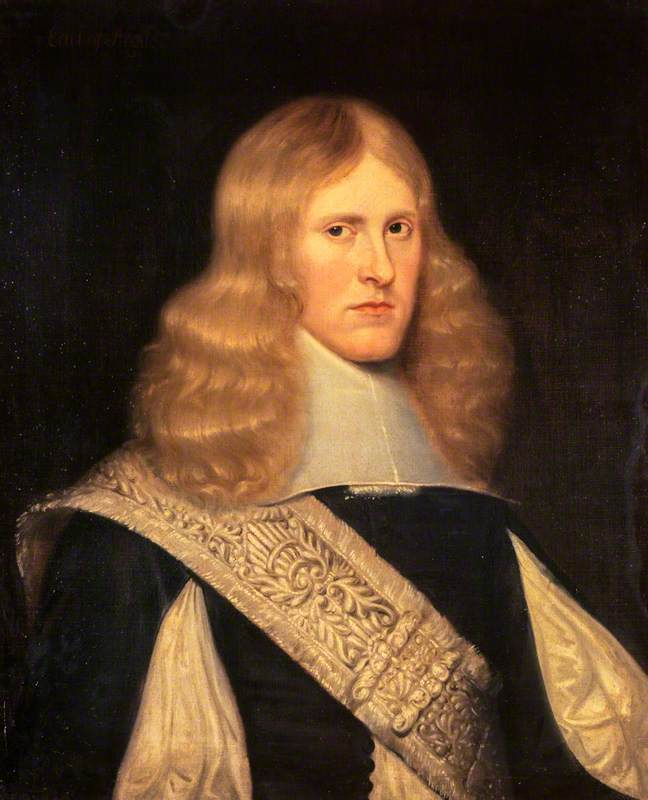
Portrait traditionally identified as the 9th Earl, but subsequently confirmed as being of the 8th Earl in his youth (Scottish Notes and Queries, v11, pp.5–6). His biographer John Willcock believed that it dated from his 1626 marriage.

On the outbreak of the religious dispute between the king and Scotland in 1637, Lord Lorne's support was eagerly sought by Charles I. He was made a privy councillor in 1628. In 1638, the king summoned him, together with the earls of Traquair and Roxburgh, to London, but he refused to be won over, warned Charles against his despotic ecclesiastical policy, and showed great hostility towards William Laud. In consequence, a secret commission was given to the Randal MacDonnell, Earl of Antrim to invade Argyll and stir up the MacDonalds against the Campbells. Argyll, who inherited the title at the death of his father in 1638, originally had no preference for Presbyterianism, but now definitely took the side of the Covenanters in defence of national religion and liberties. Argyll continued to attend the meetings of the General Assembly of the Church of Scotland after its dissolution by the Marquess of Hamilton, when Episcopacy was abolished. In 1639, he sent a statement to Laud, and subsequently to the king, defending the General Assembly's action.

During what became known as the First Bishops' War, Argyll raised a body of troops and seized Hamilton's castle of Brodick in Arran. After the Pacification of Berwick, he carried a motion, in opposition to James Graham, 1st Marquess of Montrose, by which the estates secured to themselves the election of the lords of the articles, who had formerly been nominated by the king. This was a fundamental change to the Scottish constitution, whereby the management of public affairs was entrusted to a representative body and withdrawn from the control of the crown.

An attempt by the king to deprive Argyll of his office as justiciary of Argyll failed, and on the prorogation of the parliament by Charles, in May 1640, Argyll moved that it should continue its sittings and that the government and safety of the kingdom should be secured by a committee of the estates, of which he was the guiding spirit. In June, as part of what became known as the Second Bishops' War, he was trusted with a Commission of fire and sword against the royalists in Atholl and Angus, which, after succeeding in entrapping John Murray, 1st Earl of Atholl, he carried out with completeness and cruelty.

It was on this occasion that the Bonnie Hoose o' Airlie was burned. By this time, the personal dislike and difference in opinion between Montrose and Argyll led to an open breach. The former arranged that on the occasion of Charles's approaching visit to Scotland, Argyll would be accused of high treason in the parliament. The plot, however, was disclosed, and Montrose, among others, was imprisoned. Accordingly, when the king arrived, he found himself deprived of every remnant of influence and authority. It only remained for Charles to make a series of concessions. He transferred control over judicial and political appointments to the parliament, created Argyll a marquess in 1641, and returned home, having, in Clarendon's words, made a perfect deed of gift of that kingdom. Meanwhile, there was an unsuccessful attempt to kidnap Argyll, Hamilton, and Lanark, known as The Incident. Argyll was mainly instrumental in this crisis in keeping the national party faithful to what was to him evidently the common cause, and in accomplishing the alliance with the Long Parliament in 1643.

== English and Scottish Civil Wars ==
In January 1644, he accompanied the Scottish army into England as a member of the Committee of Both Kingdoms and in command of a troop of horse, but was soon compelled, in March, to return to suppress Royalists in the Scottish Civil War and to defend his own territories. He forced Huntly to retreat in April. In July, he advanced to abet the Irish troops now landed in Argyll, which were fighting in conjunction with Montrose, who had put himself at the head of the Royalist forces in Scotland. Neither general succeeded in obtaining an advantage over the other, or even in engaging in battle. Argyll then returned to Edinburgh, threw up his commission, and retired to Inveraray Castle. Montrose unexpectedly followed him in December, compelling him to flee to Roseneath, and devastating his territories. On 2 February 1645, while following Montrose northwards, Argyll was surprised by him at Inverlochy. He witnessed, from his barge on the lake to which he had retired after falling from his horse, a fearful slaughter of his troops, which included 1,500 of the Campbells. He arrived at Edinburgh on 12 February and was again present at Montrose's further great victory on 15 August at Kilsyth, whence he escaped to Newcastle. Argyll was at last delivered from his formidable antagonist by Montrose's final defeat at Philiphaugh on 12 September.

In 1646, he was sent to negotiate with the king at Newcastle after his surrender to the Scottish army, when he endeavoured to moderate the demands of the parliament and at the same time to persuade the king to accept them. On 7 July 1646, he was appointed a member of the Assembly of Divines.

Up to this point, Argyll's statesmanship had been highly successful. The national liberties and religion of Scotland had been defended and guaranteed, and the power of the king in Scotland reduced to a mere shadow. In addition, these privileges had been still further secured by the alliance with the English opposition, and by the subsequent triumph of the Parliament and Presbyterianism in the neighbouring kingdom. The king himself was a prisoner in their midst. But Argyll's influence could not survive the rupture of the alliance between the two nations on which his whole policy was founded. He opposed in vain the Engagement, concluded in December 1647, between Charles I and the Scots against the English Parliament. James, Duke of Hamilton commanded an Engager army that marched into England and was defeated by Cromwell at Preston the following August. Argyll, after a narrow escape from a surprise attack at the Battle of Stirling in September 1648, joined the Whiggamores, a body of Covenanters at Edinburgh; and, supported by John Campbell, 1st Earl of Loudoun and Alexander Leslie, 1st Earl of Leven, he established a new government, which welcomed Oliver Cromwell on his arrival there on 4 October 1648.

== War with the English Parliament and personal ruin ==
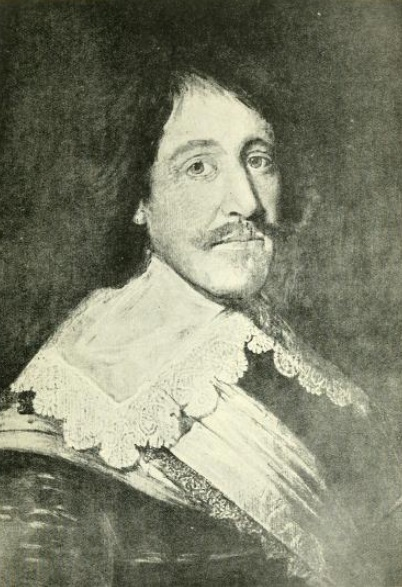
Photograph of now lost portrait of c.1644, attributed to George Jamesone, of Archibald Campbell, Marquess of Argyll, formerly at Castle Campbell. The painting, rediscovered in an estate cottage in c.1870, was destroyed in an 1877 fire at Inveraray Castle.

This alliance, however, was at once destroyed by the execution of Charles I on 30 January 1649, which excited universal horror in Scotland. In the series of tangled incidents which followed, Argyll lost control of the national policy. He describes himself at this period as "a distracted man ... in a distracted time" whose "remedies ... had the quite contrary operation".

Argyll supported the invitation from the Covenanters to Charles II to land in Scotland, and gazed upon the captured Montrose, bound on a cart to execution at Edinburgh. When Charles II came to Scotland, having signed the Covenant and repudiated Montrose, Argyll remained at the head of the administration. After the defeat of Dunbar, Charles retained his support by the promise of a dukedom and the Garter, and an attempt was made by Argyll to marry the king to his daughter, Lady Anne. On 1 January 1651, he placed the crown on Charles's head at Scone. But his power had now passed to the Hamiltonian party.

Argyll strongly opposed, but was unable to prevent, the expedition into England. In the subsequent reduction of Scotland, after holding out in Inveraray Castle for nearly a year, he was at last surprised in August 1652 and submitted to the Commonwealth. His ruin was then complete. His policy had failed, his power had vanished. He was hopelessly in debt, and on terms of such violent hostility with his eldest son and heir Archibald as to be obliged to demand a garrison in his house for his protection.

During his visit to George Monck at Dalkeith in 1654 to complain of this, Argyll was subjected to much personal insult from his creditors, and on visiting London in September 1655 to obtain money due to him from the Scottish Parliament, he was arrested for debt, though soon liberated. In Richard Cromwell's Parliament of 1659 Argyll sat as member for Aberdeenshire.

== After the Restoration ==
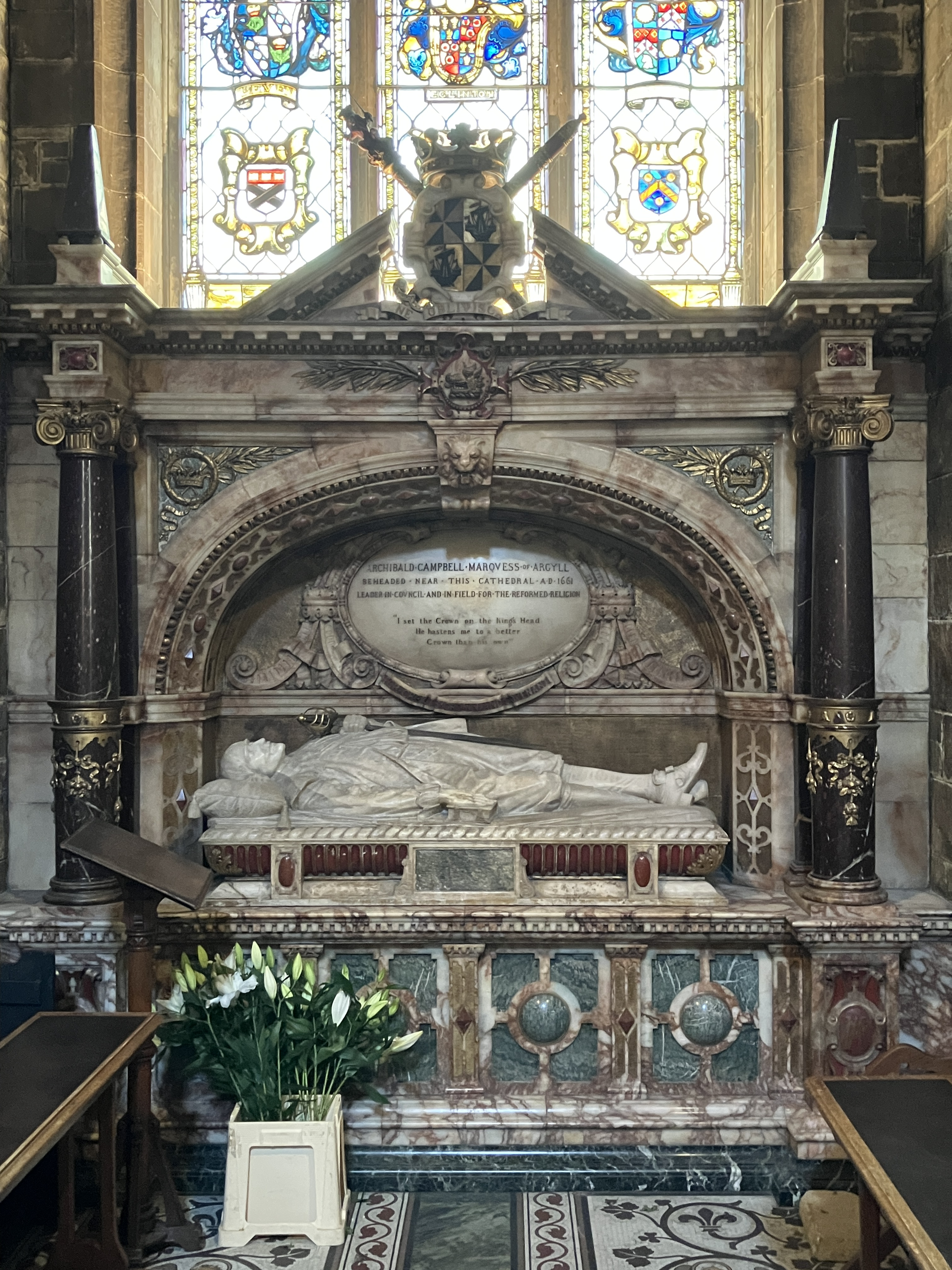
Memorial to Argyll in St. Giles Kirk, Edinburgh

At the Restoration, Argyll presented himself at Whitehall, but was at once arrested by order of Charles II and placed in the Tower of London (1660), before being sent to Edinburgh to stand trial for high treason. He was acquitted of complicity in the death of Charles I, and his escape from the whole charge seemed imminent, but the arrival of a packet of letters written by Argyll to Monck showed conclusively his collaboration with Cromwell's Protectorate of England, particularly in the violent suppression of Glencairn's Royalist rising in 1652. He was found guilty and sentenced to death, his execution by beheading on the 'Maiden' taking place on 27 May 1661, before the death warrant had even been signed by the king. He was attended in his final hours by Rev Archibald Hutchison of Tolbooth Parish (contained in St Giles Cathedral) which oversaw the Tolbooth prison.

His head was deliberately placed on the same spike upon the west end of the Tolbooth, as that of Montrose, who had previously been exposed there, and his body was buried at Kilmun Parish Church near the Holy Loch, where the head was also deposited in 1664. A monument was erected to his memory in High Kirk of St Giles in Edinburgh in 1895.

== Works ==
While imprisoned in the Tower he wrote Instructions to a Son (1661). Some of his speeches, including the one delivered on the scaffold, were published and are printed in the Harleian Miscellany.

== Family ==
Argyll married Lady Margaret Douglas, second daughter of William Douglas, 7th Earl of Morton, with whom he had two sons, the elder of whom, Archibald, succeeded him as the 9th Earl, and four daughters.

== Ancestry ==
Ancestors of Archibald Campbell, 1st Marquess of Argyll

8. Archibald Campbell, 4th Earl of Argyll
4. Colin Campbell, 6th Earl of Argyll
9. Lady Margaret Graham
2. Archibald Campbell, 7th Earl of Argyll
10. William Keith, 4th Earl Marischal
5. Agnes Keith, Countess of Moray
11. Margaret Keith
1. Archibald Campbell, Marquess of Argyll
12. Sir Robert Douglas of Lochleven
6. William Douglas, 6th Earl of Morton
13. Margaret Erskine
3. Agnes Douglas, Countess of Argyll
14. George Leslie, 4th Earl of Rothes
7. Agnes Leslie, Countess of Morton
15. Margaret Crichton

== Notes ==
Peerage of Scotland
New creation	Marquess of Argyll; 1641–1661	Forfeit
Preceded by Archibald Campbell	Earl of Argyll; 1638–1661	Succeeded by Archibald Campbell
