= Engagers =

Faction of the Scottish Covenanters

The Engagers
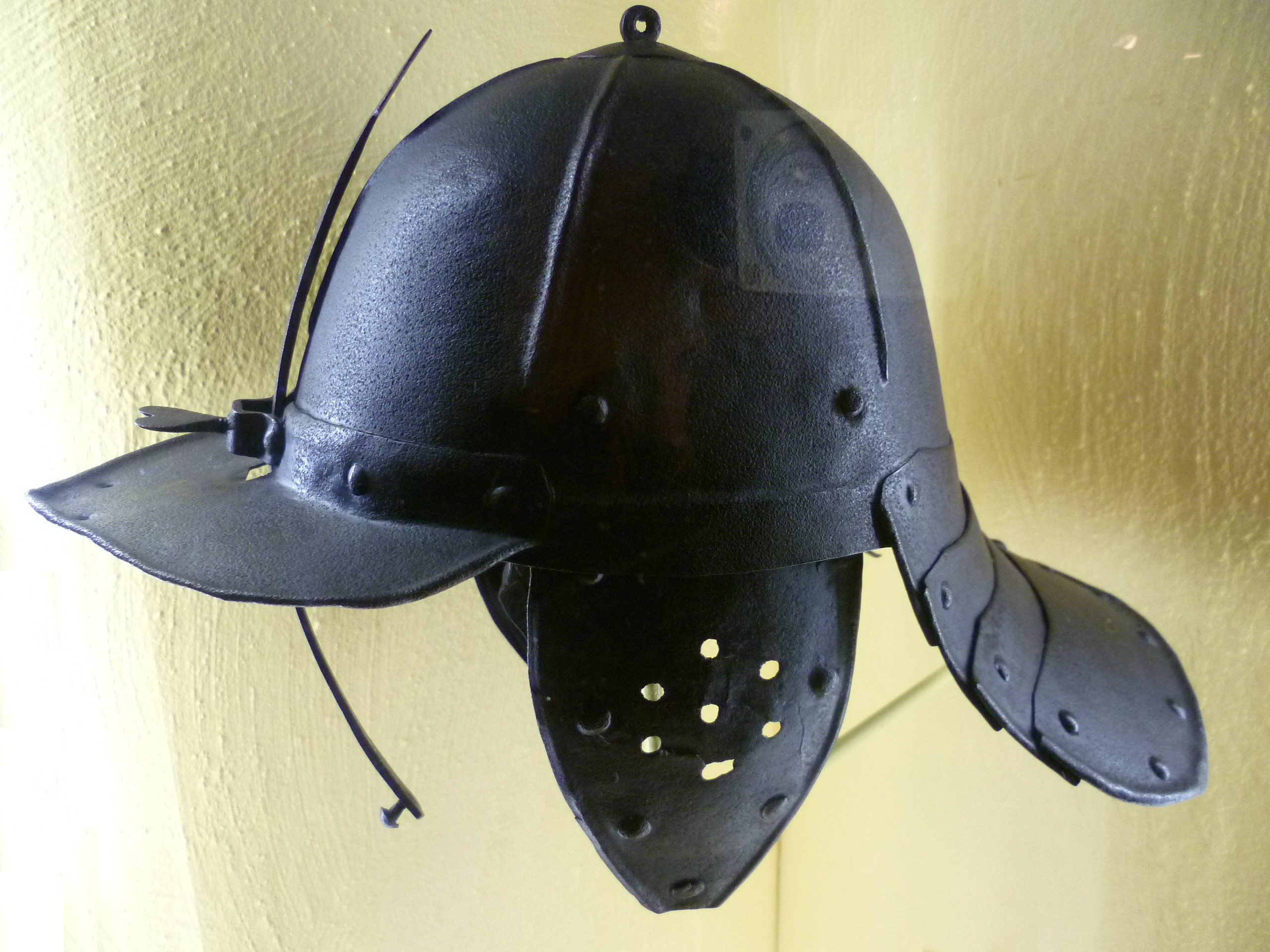
- A Covenanter's helmet from the period in the Museum of Edinburgh
- Founded: December 1647
- Dissolved: 1651
- Split from: Covenanters
- Religion: Presbyterianism (Church of Scotland)

The Engagers were a faction of the Scottish Covenanters, who made "The Engagement" with King Charles I in December 1647 while he was imprisoned in Carisbrooke Castle by the English Parliamentarians after his defeat in the First Civil War.

== Background ==
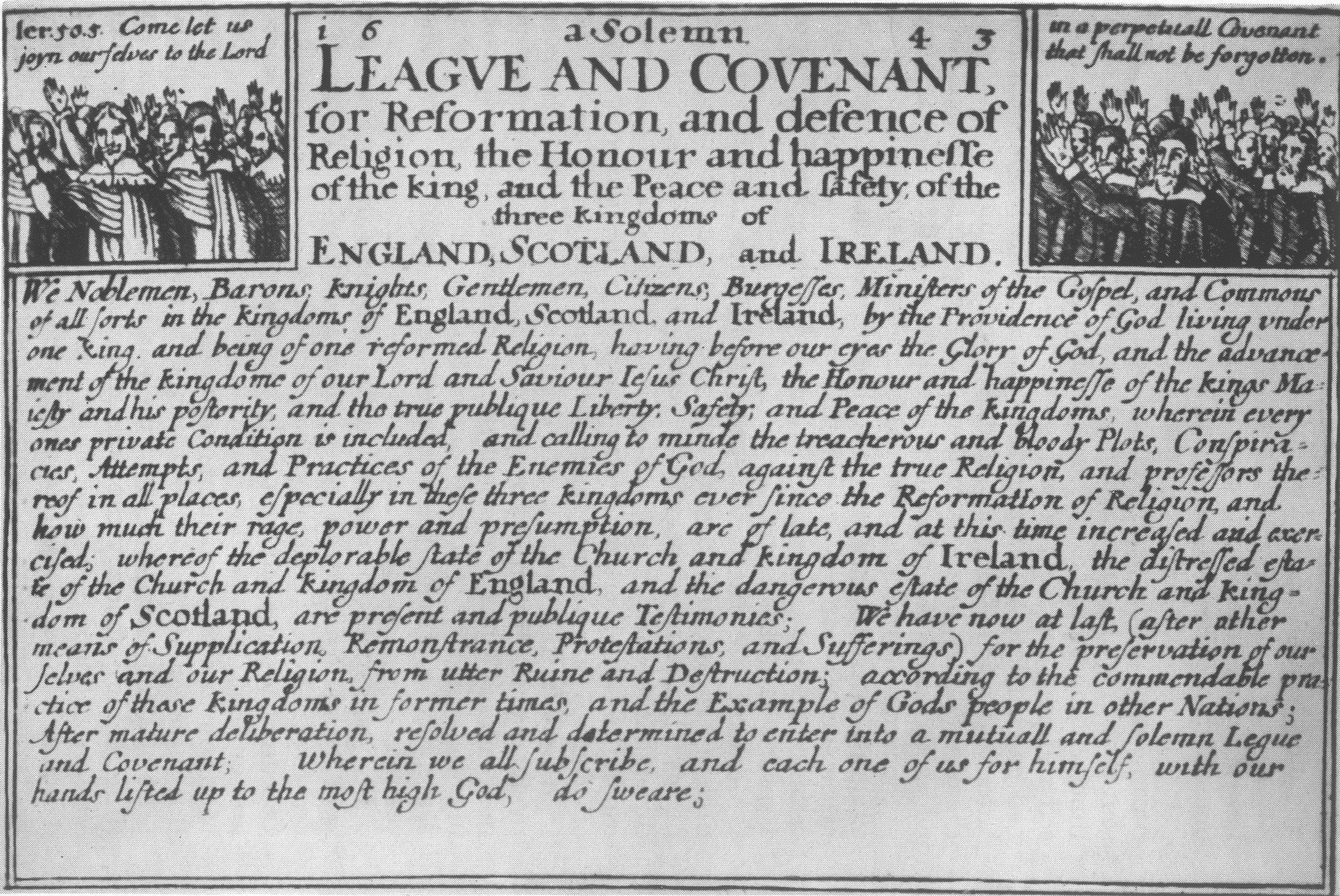
The Solemn League and Covenant agreed by English and Scottish Presbyterians in 1643

In the 17th and 18th centuries, politics and religion were closely linked; it is impossible to understand differences between Engagers, Royalists or Kirk Party political views without an appreciation of these distinctions.

'Presbyterian' versus 'Episcopalian' implied differences in governance, not doctrine. Episcopalian meant rule by bishops, appointed by the monarch; Presbyterian structures were controlled by Elders, nominated by their congregations. Arguments over structure or governance of the church were as much about politics and the power of the monarch as religious practice; political divisions often centred on different interpretations of this.

The Protestant Reformation created a Church of Scotland, or 'kirk', Presbyterian in structure and governance, and predominantly Calvinist in doctrine. When James VI and I became king of England in 1603, a unified Church of Scotland and England governed by bishops became the first step in his vision of a centralised, Unionist state. Although both churches were nominally Episcopalian, they were very different in doctrine; even bishops in Scotland viewed many Church of England practices as little better than Catholicism.

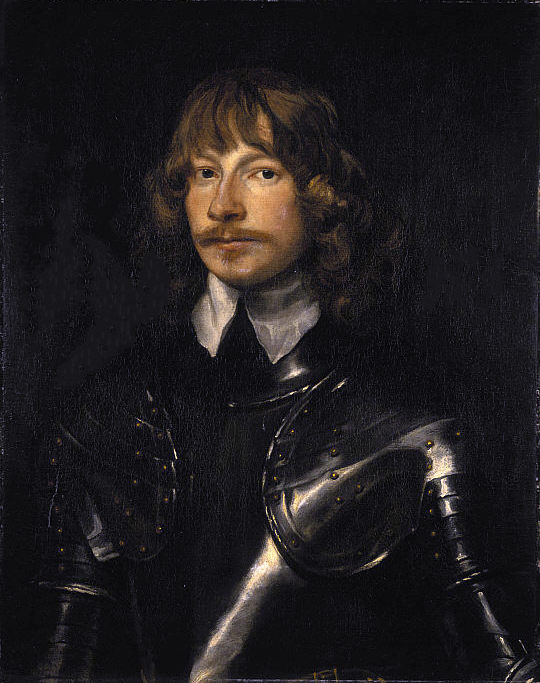
James Graham, Marquis of Montrose; Royalist commander in Scotland 1644–1645, but a Covenanter general 1638 to 1640

Efforts by Charles I to impose uniform practices led to the 1638 National Covenant, whose signatories pledged to resist liturgical 'innovations'. In December 1638, bishops were expelled from the kirk; when Charles attempted to use military force, he was defeated in the 1639 and 1640 Bishops' Wars, which left the Covenanter party in control of Scotland.

Calvinists believed a 'well-ordered' monarchy was part of God's plan; as a result, the vast majority of Covenanters agreed monarchy itself was divinely ordered but disagreed on who held ultimate authority in clerical affairs. Royalists and Engagers tended to argue the king held supreme authority, but that did not necessarily mean they supported bishops and individual motives were very complex. Many fought for both Covenant and king at different times, including Montrose.

When the First English Civil War began in 1642, Scotland initially remained neutral, but became involved in the Irish Rebellion; the bitterness of this conflict radicalised views in Scotland and Ireland. The Covenanter faction known as the Kirk Party, led by Argyll, saw religious union with England as the best way to preserve a Presbyterian kirk and in October 1643 the Solemn League and Covenant agreed a Presbyterian Union in return for Scottish military support.

Royalists and moderates in both Scotland and England opposed union, as did the religious Independents like Oliver Cromwell, who dominated the New Model Army and opposed any state-ordered church. Both Covenanters and their English allies saw the Independents as a bigger threat than the Royalists and when Charles surrendered in 1646, they began negotiations to restore him to the English throne.

== The Engagement ==
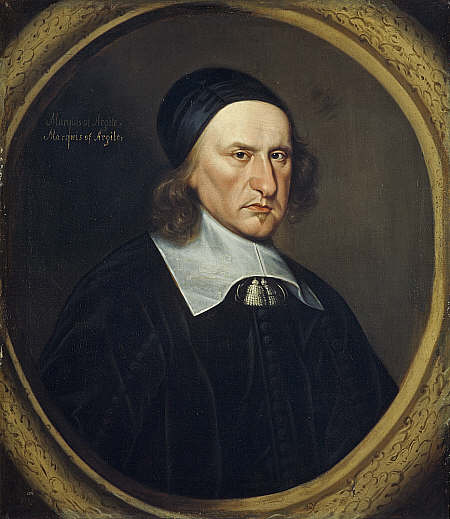
Marquess of Argyll, whose Kirk Party opposed the Engagement

The Scots nominated three Commissioners to negotiate with Charles; Lauderdale, Lanark and Loudoun. In December 1647, Charles agreed to impose Presbyterianism in England for three years and suppress the Independents, but his refusal to take the Covenant himself split the Scots. It was not until April 1648 the Engagers achieved a majority in the Scottish Parliament; Argyll's Kirk Party did not trust Charles, objected to an alliance with English and Scots Royalists, and denounced the Engagement as 'sinful.'

Most of the Scottish army had been demobilised and efforts to recruit new regiments were undermined when many refused to serve, including their most experienced generals, Lord Leven and David Leslie. The inexperienced Duke of Hamilton was given command, with the Earl of Callendar as his subordinate. When deputy to Leven, Callendar's overestimation of his military abilities had led to constant conflict and this was repeated with Hamilton. His commander of infantry, William Baillie, had direct experience of the New Model Army and doubted their ability to defeat it.

After dispersing Kirk Party dissidents at Mauchline Muir in June 1648, a poorly trained Engager army of 9,000 marched into England. The Second English Civil War was intended as a series of Royalist risings in England and Wales, with the Scots providing support. By the time Hamilton's army entered Lancashire in early August, the other revolts had been suppressed and Cromwell routed the Engagers at Preston on 19 August. Hamilton was taken prisoner and executed in March 1649.

== Aftermath ==
Defeat at Preston led to the collapse of the Engager regime; the Kirk Party took control of Edinburgh and although repulsed at Stirling in September, a new civil war seemed imminent. However, with Cromwell's support, Argyll took control and expelled his Engager opponents, with English troops being withdrawn.

The 1649 Act of Classes banned Engagers and Royalists from holding political or military office and established the Kirk Party as the government of Scotland. However, the execution of Charles in January 1649 was viewed by Covenanters as an offence against God; they proclaimed his son Charles II King of Scotland and Great Britain. In the 1650 Treaty of Breda, they agreed to restore Charles to the English throne; in return he accepted the Covenant. Defeats by Cromwell at Dunbar and Worcester resulted in Scotland being incorporated into the Commonwealth of England, Scotland and Ireland in 1654.

== Sources ==
- Harris, Tim (2015). Rebellion: Britain's First Stuart Kings, 1567-1642. OUP Oxford. ISBN 978-0198743118.
- McDonald, Alan (1998). The Jacobean Kirk, 1567–1625: Sovereignty, Polity and Liturgy. Routledge. ISBN 185928373X.
- Mackie, JD; Lenman, Bruce; Parker, Geoffrey (1986). A History of Scotland. Hippocrene Books. ISBN 978-0880290401.
- Macleod, Donald (Autumn 2009). "The influence of Calvinism on politics" (PDF). Theology in Scotland. XVI (2).
- Mitchison, Rosalind; Fry, Peter; Fry, Fiona (2002). A History of Scotland. Routledge. ISBN 978-1138174146.
- Robertson, Barry (2014). Royalists at War in Scotland and Ireland, 1638–1650. Ashgate. ISBN 978-1409457473.
- Royle, Trevor (2005). Civil War: The War of the Three Kingdoms 1638-1660. Abacus. ISBN 0349115648.
- Stephen, Jeffrey (January 2010). "Scottish Nationalism and Stuart Unionism". Journal of British Studies. 49 (1, Scottish Special). doi:10.1086/644534. S2CID 144730991.
