= Kirk Party =

Former Scottish Presbyterian political party (1647-1651)

- Leader: The Marquess of Argyll
- Founded: 1647; 379 years ago
- Dissolved: 1651; 375 years ago
- Split from: Covenanters
- Religion: Presbyterianism

The Kirk Party were a radical Presbyterian faction of the Scottish Covenanters during the Wars of the Three Kingdoms. They came to the fore after the defeat of the Engagers faction in 1648 at the hands of Oliver Cromwell and the English Parliament. At this time Scottish opinion became divided between the Kirk Party, a religious group led by Archibald Campbell, 1st Marquess of Argyll, and a political group led by James Hamilton.

Kirk is a Scottish word meaning a church, or more specifically, the Church of Scotland. The Kirk Party intended to run Scotland as a theocracy, and ensure moral reform. They purged the Covenanters' General Assembly and army of "ungodly elements" and crowned Charles II as King of Scotland in 1651, in return for his explicit endorsement of their religious and political agenda in the Treaty of Breda (1650).

The Kirk party's religious zeal did not help their cause militarily. In the month before the Battle of Dunbar they chose to institute a searching three-day examination of the political and religious sentiments of the Scottish army. The result was that the army was purged of "Malignants", 80 officers and 3000 experienced soldiers, while it lay within musket shot of the enemy. Their ranks were to some extent made up with replacements with strong spiritual beliefs but little military experience. The Kirk party were therefore discredited when their army was routed by Cromwell's New Model Army at the Battle of Dunbar, in September 1650.

After this time, a more representative faction came to the fore in Scottish politics, which tried to reconcile (at least temporarily) the different factions of the Covenanters and Scottish Royalists to resist Cromwell's invasion of Scotland. However, they in turn were defeated at the Battle of Worcester in 1651, leading eventually to Scotland's incorporation into the Commonwealth of England.

The Kirk party were disparagingly called "whiggamores" or "whigs" by their Scottish opponents (after the Whiggamore Raid). The nickname was later applied (equally offensively) to those, headed by Anthony Ashley Cooper, Earl of Shaftesbury, calling for the exclusion of James, Duke of York from the English throne on the grounds of his Catholicism.

== See also ==
- History of Scotland
- Scotland in the Wars of the Three Kingdoms
