= Manus O'Cahan's Regiment =

Irish regiment in the 1640s

Manus O'Cahan's Regiment of Foot was an Irish regiment which served during the Wars of the Three Kingdoms in the mid-1640s.

== History ==
Manus O'Cahan's Regiment of Foot was a body of soldiers, many of whom fought in Europe in the early years of the Thirty Years War. Historians such as C. V. Wedgwood refer to them as a 'Gallowglass' (i.e. mercenary) regiment. They were actually soldiers who sailed from Ireland to Scotland to fight for the Royalist cause there. Manus O'Cahan (Irish: Maghnus Ó Catháin) never set foot in England; all of his fighting took place in Ulster and Scotland. Their European combat experiences made them some of the most experienced soldiers serving in the Civil War.

Some of the men involved appear in a letter contained in the Ormond papers in the National Library of Ireland entitled "List of men gone unto the Isles. Sent by the Lord of Antrim to my Lord Ormonde, 15 Nov. 1644". The text reads:

A breefe note of Collonell O Cahan's regiment:

Collonnell Cahan's own company consisting of 100 men complete.

Officers Lieftennant Cnogher O Cahan

Ancient Dualtagh Mac Duffy

Sargeants of the company Owen O Cognoghor and Hugh Mac Cormacke

Lieftennant Collonnell Donnaghe O Cahan's company consisting of 100 men complete.

Officers Lieftennant Shane O Cahan

Ancient John Cooper

Sarjeants of the company Bryen Oge Mac Cormacke and William Oge Mac Cormacke

Sarjeant-Major Ledwitch his company consisting of 100 men complete.

Officers Lieftennant James Dease

Ancient Bartholomew Newgent

Sarjeants of the company Tohill Moddirrt Mac Illrey and John That.

Captain Art O Neale's company consisting of 100 men complete.

Officers Lieftennant Con O Neale

Ancient Bryen O Neale

Serjeants Hugh Oge Lavery and Hary O Muldowne

Captain John Mortimer's company consisting of 50 men complete.

Officers Patricke O Mallen, Lieftennant

Phelim O Donnelly,

Ancient Daniel Mac Duffy and James O Mulhollan, Sargeants.

Captain Rowry Duffe O Cahan's company consisting of 50 men complete.

Officers John Mac Guyer, Lieftenant

Donnagh O Cahan, Ancient

Edward Keltey and Terlagh Mac Cana, Serjeant .

In all, 500 besydes officers

== Background ==
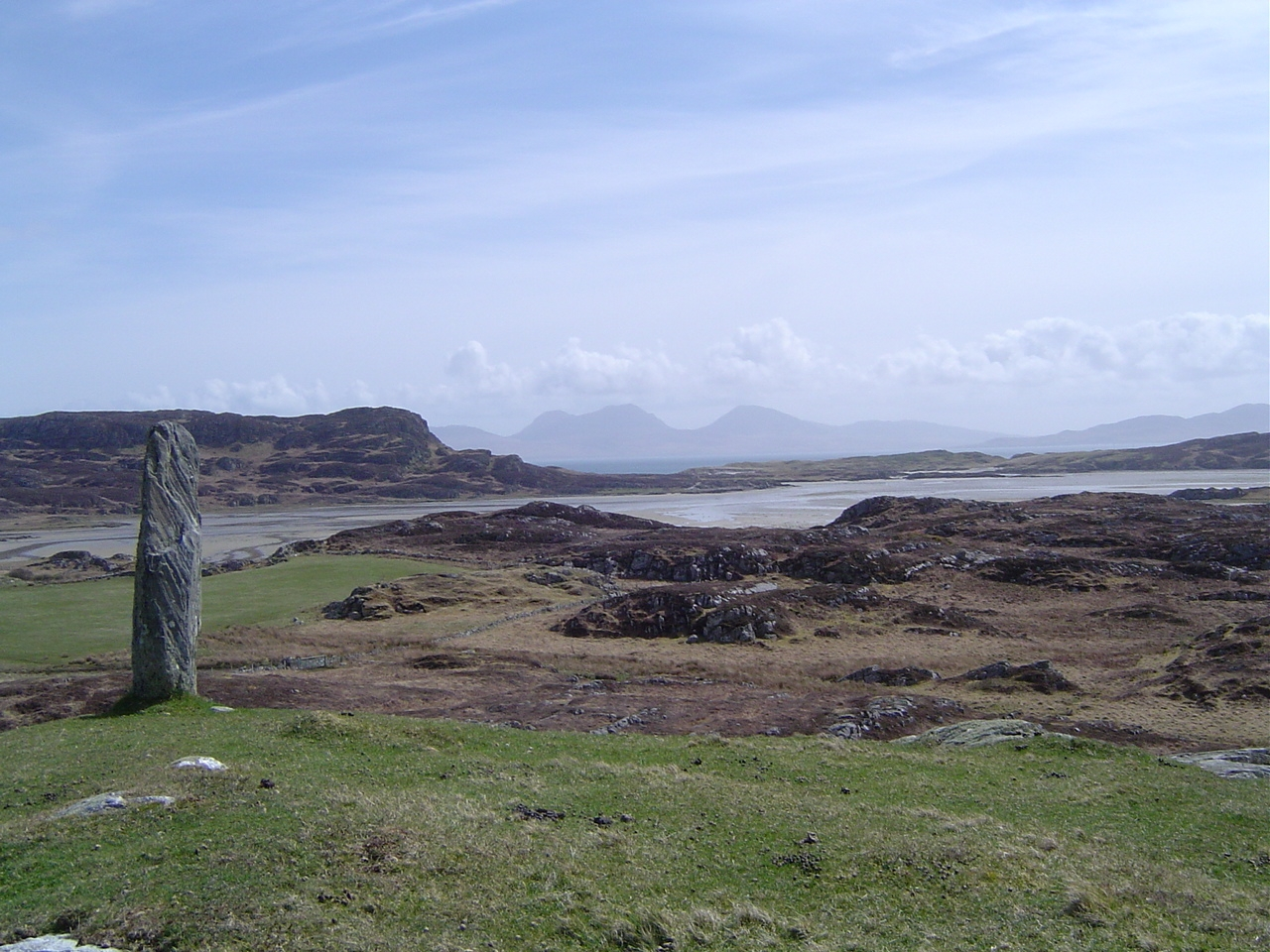
Colonsay in the Hebrides

Macdonald territories in Scotland originally formed a relatively homogeneous unit with those held by their Irish cousins the MacDonnells in County Antrim. With the loss of the Lordship of the Isles in 1493, these links were severed, leading to nearly two centuries of conflict for their possession, primarily between the MacDonalds, the McLeans and the Campbells. The Hebridean isles of Islay and Colonsay had been held by the MacDonald leader Colkitto, whose mother was an O'Cahan but in 1614, the Scottish Crown transferred ownership to the Campbells in return for pacifying them.

Religion was another cause of tension; the Protestant Reformation created a Calvinist Church of Scotland and by 1640, Catholicism was largely restricted to Gaelic-speaking areas held by the MacDonalds in the remote Highlands and Islands. Conflict between the Episcopalian Charles I and the Scots ended with the 1638-1639 Bishops' Wars and installed a largely autonomous Covenanter regime.

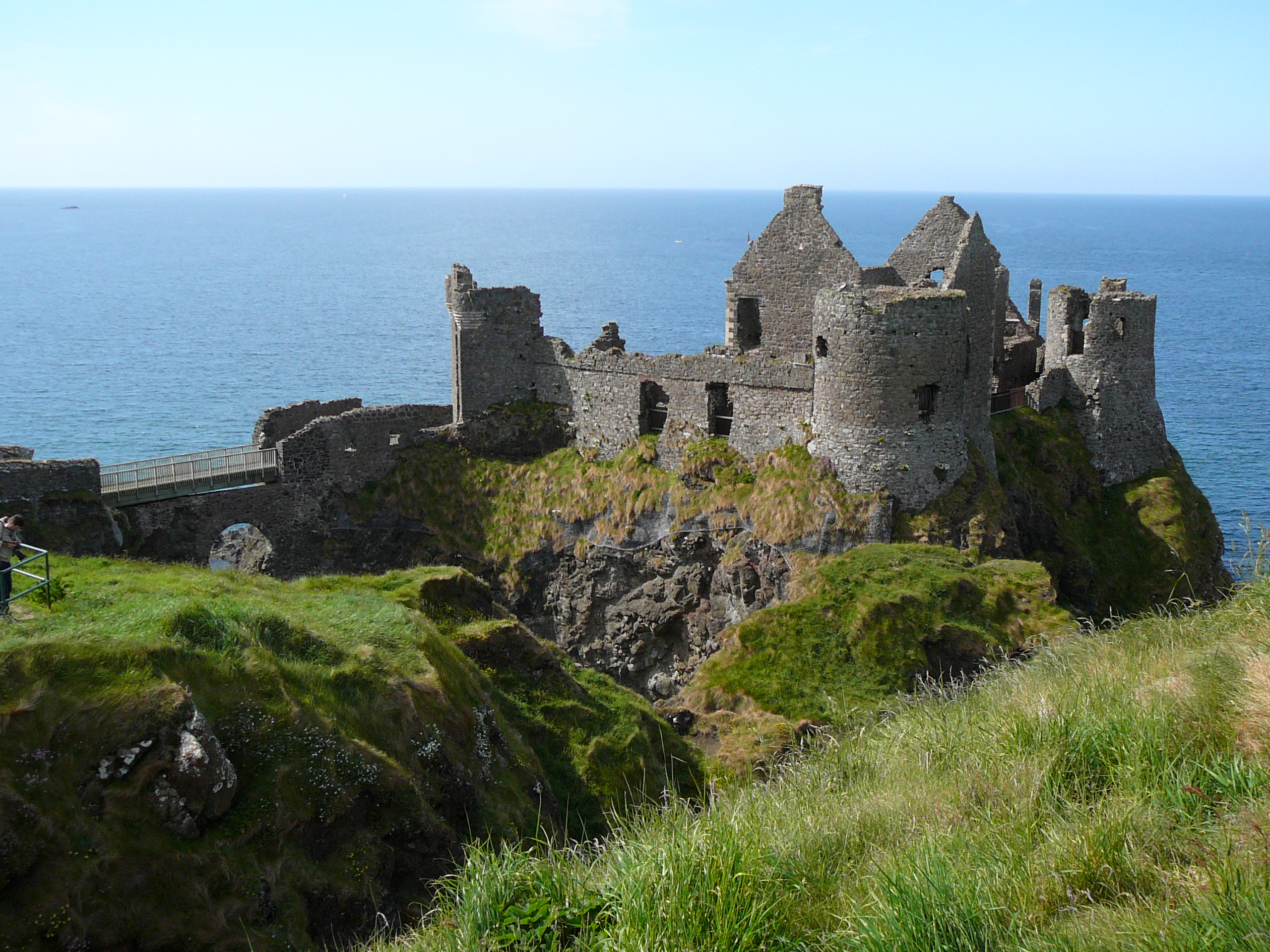
Dunluce Castle in County Antrim; owned by Randal Macdonnell, who raised O'Cahan's regiment in 1644.

In Ireland, the post-1609 Plantation of Ulster dispossessed traditional Irish landholders like the MacDonnells in favour of Protestant settlers, many of whom were Scots. Political instability and a desire to reverse these losses resulted in the 1641 Irish Rebellion; the Covenanters originally remained neutral in the 1642-1651 Wars of the Three Kingdoms but sent troops to Ulster to support their co-religionists and the bitterness of this conflict radicalised views in both countries.

The Royalists hesitated to use Irish troops outside Ireland but by 1644, the war in England was turning against them; Randal MacDonnell, Marquess of Antrim, raised an Irish Brigade, containing three regiments of foot, one of which was O'Cahan's. Colkitto's son Alastair McColla was appointed to command the Brigade but his objective of regaining family lands in South-West Scotland would ultimately clash with those of the Royalist leader, James Graham.

James Graham, 1st Marquess of Montrose fought for the Covenanters in the Bishops Wars; unlike England, Covenanters and Scottish Royalists both agreed monarchy itself was divinely ordered but differed on who held primacy in religious affairs. This meant many Scots like Montrose fought on both sides at various times; both the Second and Third English Civil Wars were fought by the Covenanter governments to restore first Charles I, then his son back on the English throne. In June 1644, O'Cahan's Regiment was shipped to Scotland with the other parts of the Brigade.

== MacColla and O'Cahan ==
In 1641, as McColla raised his army in Ulster, on behalf of Randal MacDonnell (Earl of Antrim), a strong Royalist sympathiser, the Irish Rebellion of 1641 erupted. Catholics turned on Protestant settlers who were pouring into the country by the thousand under a much despised plantation programme. McColla, and a cousin by marriage, Manus O'Cahan, were thrown together in a joint Catholic-Protestant Scots-Irish peace keeping force.

Finding themselves despised by the Protestants in the force, the Scot and the Irishman rebelled and went on a guerrilla warfare rampage throughout Northern Ireland. In the course of the conflict they developed a new battle technique known as the 'Irish Charge', which involved discarding heavy weapons such as pikes and muskets to rush the enemy to kill them at close quarter with dirks, daggers and swords or even with unarmed combat tactics. It proved to be highly effective, especially against musketeers who needed time to reload powder and shot between volleys. They perfected the art of running directly at cavalry to cut the horses in the bellies and fetlocks as they ran underneath them. This forced the agonised horses to throw their riders.

McColla made himself unpopular in Ireland by changing sides, to serve the Protestants, and then changing sides again to serve Antrim and the Irish Catholic Confederation of which Antrim was a leader. As the Scottish Covenant forces declared military support for the English Parliament in late 1643, Antrim hit on a plan to send Catholic troops to Scotland. The aim was for them to cause as much destruction as possible, to force the Scots to withdraw from Ireland, to deal with the increasing crisis back home. Antrim negotiated the plans through the Confederacy's Supreme Council, and with the full blessing of James Butler, Earl of Ormonde, a personal advisor to King Charles.

In one Ulster battle, McColla was badly wounded. O'Cahan personally dragged his giant [7-foot-tall (2.1 m)] friend to safety through heavy fire on a makeshift litter and got him medical attention. King Charles initially recalled his Parliament to raise an army to quell the Irish rebellion. When his Parliament refused to co-operate with him, his efforts to accuse them of treason against the crown led to the English portion of the Civil War.

As war erupted in England, Scottish Royalists, as planned by the Confederation, brought the conflict to the fore in Scotland too. On Antrim's orders, McColla and O'Cahan, with Thomas Lachnan and James MacDonnell, raised an army of 1,500 men and sailed for Scotland, intending to avenge the wrongs done to them by the Campbell clan, who were ardent Covenanters. The voyage, through waters patrolled by Parliament frigates, proved eventful. The Scots-Irish Brigade did not have all the vessels they had planned. Three passenger-carrying merchant ships provided by the Kilkenny merchant Patrick Archer were in the small fleet that did sail from Waterford; The Harp, The Christopher, the Angell Gabrielle (Flemish merchantmen) and they were protected by the Jacob of Ross (Irish Merchantman). Many men, and most weapons, had to be left behind. The small fleet captured a group of Covenant ministers sailing for Ulster and took them prisoner. One captive, John Weir, kept a diary of the events from which most histories of the events are drawn.

The Scots-Irish landed in Mull on 5 July 1644. They started causing trouble and securing the coast in hope of more men coming over from Ireland. On 7 July O'Cahan led the division that took Kinlochaline Castle, coming under intense cannon fire, but emerging victorious to rejoin the main body of MacColla's men in their own captured territory, Loch Sunart.

A group of Irish stayed behind to hold the fortress at Kinlochaline. Earthwork battery ramparts and trenches were dug to help secure the territories The ships were soon lost in acts of piracy against Covenant and Parliamentary vessels that patrolled the waters looking for invaders. Realising that their position was growing increasingly dangerous as, only 1,500 strong, they were hopelessly outnumbered, O'Cahan and McColla started to move inland, recruiting among local clansmen as they went. Many refused, and some proved to be hostile. However, help came from an unexpected source, James Graham, 1st Marquess of Montrose.

== O'Cahan and Montrose ==
Montrose had planned on taking an army from England to serve his cause in Scotland, and made his way to an audience with Prince Rupert of The Rhine. Unfortunately, Montrose arrived just days after the English Royalist defeat at Marston Moor on 2 July 1644. Rupert promptly commandeered most of Montrose's men to replace his own fallen numbers. Montrose decided to go to Scotland incognito, with two allies, Sir William Rollo, and Sir James Sibbart. On the journey through his own country, Scotland, where he was now an outlaw, he learned of McColla's arrival, and raced to meet him.

McColla and O'Cahan united with Montrose on the Mull of Kintyre on 29 August 1644. The alliance proved to be formidable.

They achieved major victories and won many smaller skirmishes through the heart of Scotland in what became known as their 'Year of Glory' (1644–1645).

O'Cahan led a division on MacColla's behalf throughout the Montrose campaigns.

The first victory came at Tippermuir, on 1 September 1644. The next, at Aberdeen, on 13 September 1644, was more controversial in that the Royalists, including O'Cahan's men, were involved in the massacre of hundreds of unarmed civilians throughout the city.

Montrose wanted to expand his forces and march south, to England to help the King, who was by this time faring badly as Cromwell's New Model Army grew in strength. The bulk of the Scottish Covenant army was now fighting for Parliament in England. However, the successes of Montrose and McColla made the Covenanters withdraw men from England to fight for their home soil.

McColla, and the Scottish Highlanders who served with him alongside O'Cahan's Irishry had little interest in England, as they had their feud with the Campbells to address. The Highland warriors who came to their aid frequently left the battlefields to carry home their spoils of war, so they often vanished for months on end, though most did return. The Scottish soldiers who served Montrose constantly drew him back from his planned advances on the English border to have another charge against the forces of the Earl of Argyll, leader of the Campbell Clan.

McColla was more loyal to Montrose, but he often had to separate from him to help recruit more men as the army's numbers waned. While McColla was away, O'Cahan usually stayed with Montrose, with whom he became a powerful ally. O'Cahan briefly traveled to Ulster to try to recruit more fighters, but was unsuccessful. When McColla was away on a recruitment drive on 21 October 1644, Montrose and O'Cahan and their men found themselves pinned down at Fyvie Castle by Argyll's forces. O'Cahan led a daring night raid into the Campbell lines to break the siege. The Campbells fled and O'Cahan grabbed the powder supplies abandoned by the deserters. He jokingly told Montrose "We must at them again, for the rogues have forgot to leave the bullets with the powder." It is one of the few direct quotations that history record from him.

McColla returned soon after the battle at Fyvie with a battle plan that Montrose regarded as impossible. McColla had raised a formidable body of Scottish Highlanders, all of whom felt a desire to completely crush the Campbell Clan. They were predominantly Macdonald allies like the Clan Ranald. McColla proposed a raid through the heartland of Campbell-owned estates, in effect the complete destruction of Argyllshire. The assault was to culminate in a near suicidal march on Argyll's personal estate at Inverlochy, which was thought impossible to capture. The march on Inverlochy was made, despite Montrose's reservations, though he accompanied the force. Argyllshire was indeed razed. The hundreds of square miles covered were more remarkable for the season–during the winter blizzards of early 1645, when the sea off the coast froze. The culminating attack, and massacre of Campbells at Inverlochy on 2 February 1645 was made after a two-day march over the foothills of Ben Nevis. Argyll abandoned his men and sailed away on his personal galley to save himself.

Inverlochy was MacColla and O'Cahan's greatest moment. It is recorded that O'Cahan personally drew first blood. Few Campbell captives were allowed to live.

The year of glory was now past its peak. Montrose became increasingly overconfident and began to make tactical blunders. He wrote letters claiming that the victories were all his own doing, omitting the work of his Scots-Irish allies.

== Decline and fall ==
Montrose now had support from Royalist cavalry divisions supplied by the Gordon's Clan, and he barely spoke to the men who had served him all along. On 9 May 1645 came the debacle at Auldearn. Many early historians regard Auldearn as Montrose's supreme achievement and a carefully planned battle. In fact, it was a fiasco, where only luck and the bravery of the Scots–Irish forces saved the day.

Montrose had led his men after Covenanters who were seeking reinforcements in Inverness. Failing to catch up with them in time, Montrose camped at Auldearn, as he didn't expect the enemy to have time to launch an immediate counter-attack. In fact, the Covenanters marched all night to be able to attack the Royalists at first light at Auldearn. Covenant musketeers cleaning their guns by firing them created enough noise to warn MacColla's men. Montrose had spread his men over a wide area rather than grouping them. While McColla and O'Cahan held off the attack, Montrose desperately raced around trying to raise the rest of the camp.

The traditional story of Auldearn is that Montrose hid his main army in a hollow and set up McColla and O'Cahan as a false front and a decoy target before executing a brilliant pincer movement to trap the enemy. In fact, Montrose was caught completely off guard. MacColla's defence was much more desperate and heroic than has been claimed. Modern accounts have re-evaluated the battle, to Montrose's detriment. The Scots-Irish brigades fought ruthlessly. When a few of Clan Gordon' who had helped them started to panic, McColla personally killed them to prevent their panic causing the desertion of the rest of their clan. One of MacColla's men fought on despite taking a pike through his mouth from one cheek to the other.

Montrose arrived with reinforcements only when he had awakened and rounded up his scattered forces, saving the day. Montrose had not hidden his army in a hollow ready to affect a spectacular ambush.

Only two major Royalist victories came in the Year of Glory. The Royalists won a resounding victory on 2 July 1645 at Alford. They followed this up with a greater victory on 15 August 1645 at Kilsyth, in effect rendering the Covenant forces of the Earl of Argyll useless.

== Philiphaugh and O'Cahan's death ==
Montrose was now ready to head south through Lowland Scotland and into England, but many of his allies deserted him, as they had little interest in campaigning beyond Scotland. McColla is often accused of joining the deserters, but it is more likely that he left Montrose's side to go recruiting as he had done before. This time, he would be too late.

O'Cahan stayed with Montrose as he started to prepare for the advance to the Scottish-English border. Unfortunately, the increasing collapse of the Royalist forces in England meant that more Scots could now be sent back to resist Montrose and his allies. David Leslie, a leading soldier and Covenanter, attacked O'Cahan's men as they were waking up at an encampment in Philiphaugh on 13 September 1645. It was one year to the day after the Aberdeen massacre.

O'Cahan's forces and those of the other Irish divisions who had stayed with Montrose found themselves under surprise attack and hopelessly outnumbered. Within hours they were reduced to less than five hundred, but they fought on valiantly. Montrose, who had camped separately from the Irish, tried to fight his way to their aid, but he was forced back and eventually fled. Many were offended by this desertion, but he may have been advised to do so by his officers.

David Leslie offered O'Cahan terms of surrender. If his men laid down their arms and agreed to leave Scotland forever, they would be allowed to go free. O'Cahan agreed to this, but Leslie captured the now unarmed force, and O'Cahan witnessed the execution of virtually his entire army. The women and children who had followed his forces were also brutally executed, many by drowning in the rivers around Philipaugh. Colonels O'Cahan, and Thomas Laghtnan were taken to Edinburgh Castle and hanged from its South Wall without a trial.

== Aftermath ==
McColla and Montrose fought on, independently of one another. They never met again. In his late seventies Colkitto retook the Isle of Islay, only but was captured on 1 July 1647. He was executed soon afterwards. McColla returned to Ireland where the rebellion continued. McColla fought and died on 13 November 1647 at the Battle of Knocknanuss. Montrose fought on in Scotland until the King was captured and ordered a general Royalist cease-fire. The victorious Covenanters now forced Montrose into exile. He moved through Europe, and later led an attack on the Covenanters on behalf of King Charles II, using an inexperienced army of Danish and Scandinavian mercenaries. He was defeated at Carbisdale, in Scotland on 27 April 1650. Captured a few days later, Montrose was tried and executed in Edinburgh on 30 April 1650.

== Manus O'Cahan in fiction ==
- Marianne Lamont, Nine Moons Wasted 1976 Pan Books pseudonym of Anne Rundle. A romantic story about the Irish camp follower women who followed O'Cahan and Montrose around the battlefields.
- Sir Walter Scott, A Legend of Montrose 1819 – Novel loosely based on the assassination of Lord Kilpont soon after the battle of Tippermuir O'Cahan's men were initially suspects in the murder, which was committed by James Stewart of Ardvorlich. Scott's story changes the identity of the killer, though he names him in the introduction.
- Nigel Tranter, The Young Montrose; Montrose: The Captain General 1973 Coronet/Hodder & Stoughton. Novelised version of Montrose's life and times, with O'Cahan as a minor background character.
- Maurice Walsh, And No Quarter, 1937; the Royalist campaign of 1644-1645 told from the perspective of two members of the regiment.
