= William Rollo =

William Rollo may refer to:

- William Rollo (academic) (1892–1960), South African linguist and classicist
- Sir William Rollo (died 1645), Scottish royalist soldier
- Bill Rollo (born 1955), British Army officer
