= And No Quarter =

1937 novel by Maurice Walsh

- Author: Maurice Walsh
- Language: English
- Genre: Historical novel
- Publisher: W & R Chambers
- Publication date: 1937
- Publication place: United Kingdom
- Media type: Print (Hardback)
- Pages: 237
- Preceded by: Green Rushes
- Followed by: Sons of the Swordmaker

And No Quarter is a historical novel written by Irish author Maurice Walsh, first published in 1937. The background is the 1644–1645 campaigns in Scotland, led by the Royalist general Montrose, which formed part of the wider 1639–1651 Wars of the Three Kingdoms. The title is an allusion to the battlecry 'Jesus and no quarter' which was allegedly used by the Covenanters at the Battle of Tippermuir.

The novel's main character is an English surgeon who serves in Manus O'Cahan's Regiment under the commander Alasdair Mac Colla. The character and his Irish foster brother survive the defeat of their faction and manage to return to Ireland. They take with them a Scottish woman who is fleeing an arranged marriage. In a distant epilogue, the aging trio have fled Ireland in the aftermath of the Glorious Revolution and the Williamite War of the 1690s. They have settled instead in the Colony of Virginia, where they hope to escape the effects of the War.

== Plot summary ==
The title is based on the battlecry 'Jesus and no quarter' allegedly used by Scottish Presbyterians or Covenanters at the 1644 Battle of Tippermuir. Walsh originally wanted to use the full slogan of 'Jesus and No Quarter,' but was persuaded otherwise by his wife and publishers.

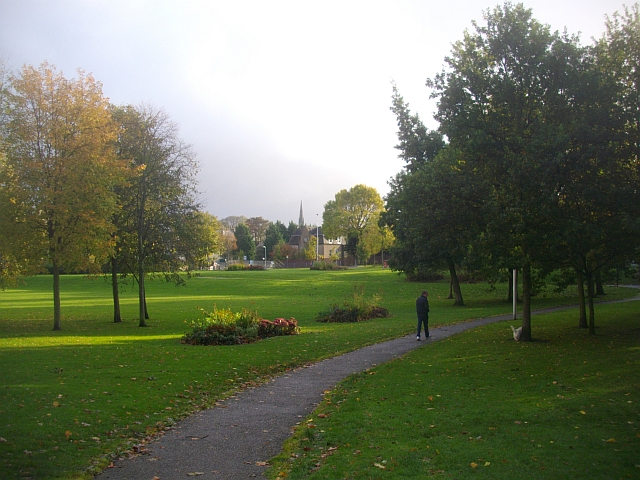
Bon Accord Terrace Gardens, Aberdeen, site of the 1644 battle when this area was outside the city.

The novel is set during the 1644-1645 Royalist campaigns in Scotland led by Montrose against the Covenanter government. The protagonist and first person narrator is Martin Somers, 'Englishman and Adjutant of Women' (or surgeon) in Manus O'Cahan's Regiment, who is accompanied by his foster-brother Tadg Mor O'Kavanagh. The regiment forms part of an Irish contingent led by Alasdair Mac Colla, within a Scots-Irish army.

The story opens just before the battle of Tippermuir in September 1644, then follows it through the Royalist victories of Aberdeen, Auldearn and Kilsyth, ending with defeat at Philiphaugh in September 1645. In the course of the campaign, Somers and his foster-brother rescue two women, the first being Meg Anderson, whom they rescue from the stocks during the sack of Aberdeen that followed the battle. The second is Isaebal Rose, who takes refuge with them in order to escape an unwanted marriage.

Both women are attracted to Somers, but Meg is killed with other Irish camp followers by Covenanter cavalry prior to Kilsyth; after the Royalist defeat at Philiphaugh, Somers and Tadg Mor rescue Isaebal from her fiancée and return to Ireland. The novel closes with the three having fled Ireland following the defeat of James II in the Glorious Revolution and the Williamite War of the 1690s. They have settled instead in the Colony of Virginia, where they hope to escape the effects of the War.

== Historical accuracy and perceived downplaying of war crimes ==
Walsh worked in Scotland for many years; his local knowledge is put to good use, while his descriptions of the battles and events leading up to them are historically accurate, although he understates the reality of the campaign.

The bitterness of the conflict in both Ireland and Scotland was reflected in the Covenanter approach to their prisoners but the depredations of Montrose's army were remembered centuries later. Aberdeen was then and remained a stronghold of Royalist support but the three-day sack that followed the battle referenced in the novel had serious consequences for Montrose's ability to recruit. Estimates of deaths vary from 50 to 170; referring to the later claim Irish troops forced people to remove their clothes before killing them, Somers records only that he 'never saw any stripped and dirked bodies.' Despite this, the historical details are generally accurate and the novel a well-balanced evocation of the time and place.

== Historical background and themes ==
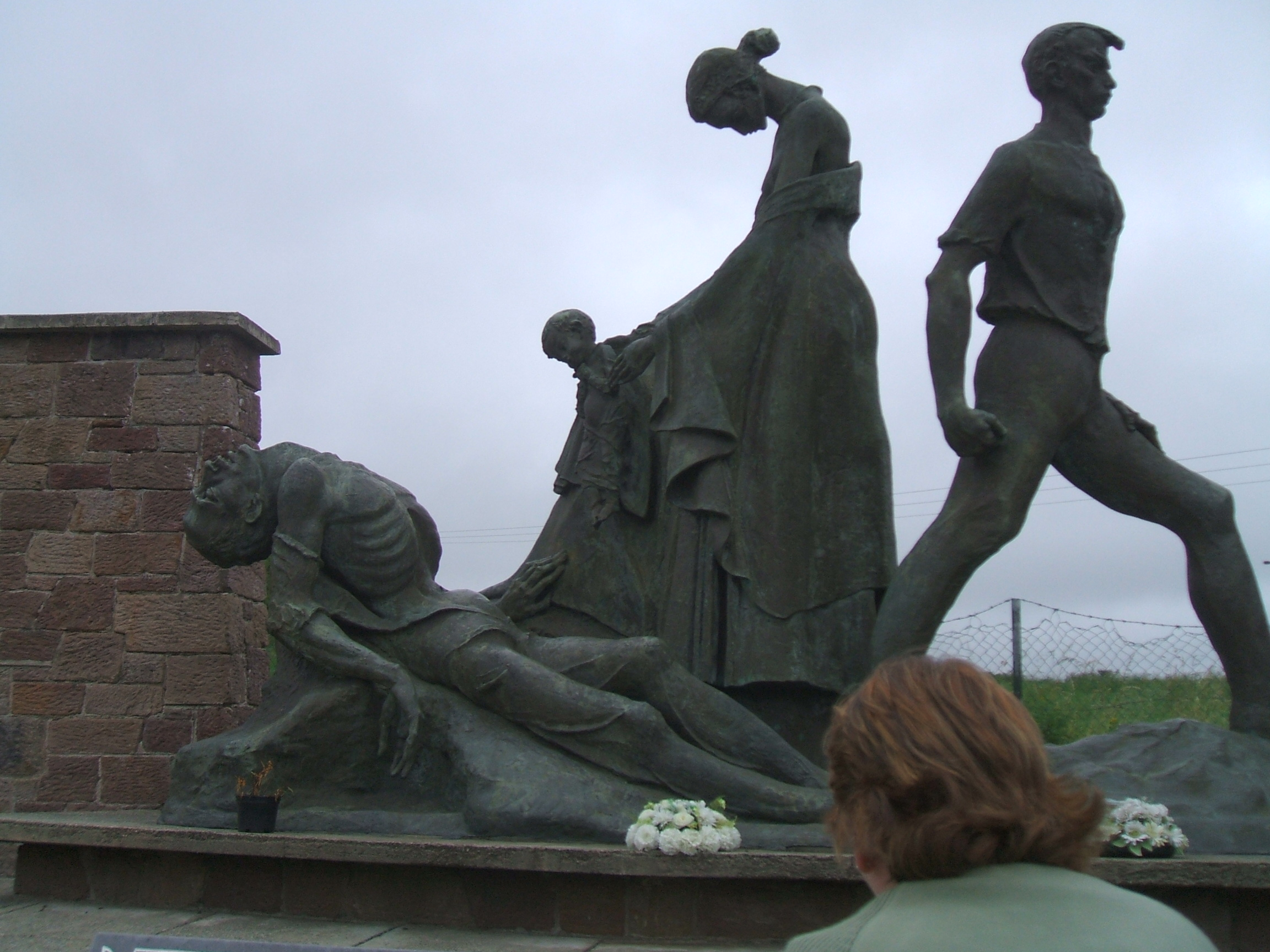
Memorial to Anti-Treaty soldiers executed by Free State forces at Ballyseedy, County Kerry.

While remembered today primarily for the film made from his short story 'The Quiet Man', in the 1930s and 1940s, Walsh was perhaps Ireland's best selling popular author whose admirers allegedly included Ernest Hemingway. Like the earlier 'Blackcock's Feather', set in the 1594-1603 Nine Years' War, the novel covers a less well-known period and perspective i.e. the Irish Brigade in Montrose's campaigns.

Walsh was writing in the aftermath of the 1922-1923 Civil War that followed the establishment of the Free State, fought with particular bitterness in his home county of Kerry. This included the war's most notorious atrocity at Ballyseedy, when nine Anti-Treaty prisoners were tied to a land mine, which was then detonated, killing eight.

Walsh appeals to the idea both of a united Gaeldom by setting the story within Montrose's combined Scottish-Irish army and a united Ireland; the hero Martin Somers an Englishman and member of the Protestant Church of Ireland, which in 2016 still had over 126,400 members in the Irish Republic. Somers also refers to his 'American mother', which may be a reference to the half-American Éamon de Valera who became Prime Minister in 1932.
