= Trouble in the Glen =

- theatrical poster
- Directed by: Herbert Wilcox
- Written by: Frank S. Nugent
- Based on: Trouble in the Glen by Maurice Walsh
- Produced by: Herbert Wilcox
- Starring: Margaret Lockwood; Orson Welles; Forrest Tucker; Victor McLaglen
- Cinematography: Max Greene
- Edited by: Reginald Beck
- Music by: Victor Young
- Production company: Everest Pictures
- Distributed by: Republic Pictures
- Release dates: 31 July 1954 (UK); 3 December 1954 (US)
- Running time: 91 minutes
- Country: United Kingdom
- Language: English

Trouble in the Glen is a 1954 British comedy film directed by Herbert Wilcox and starring Margaret Lockwood, Orson Welles, Forrest Tucker and Victor McLaglen. It is loosely based on Maurice Walsh's 1950 novel of the same name. It was filmed in Trucolor for Republic Pictures and was the last of three films made by Wilcox for Republic.

== Plot summary ==
After moving from South America to the Scottish Highlands, millionaire Sanin Cejador y Mengues (Welles) reassumes the title of laird of Glen Easan, which he inherited from his grandfather, Sandy Menzies. Obstinate in nature, Mengues soon finds the climate inhospitable, and the language and customs of the Highland people exasperating. While fishing on the loch with his equally stubborn, distantly related cousin Angus, who works as a fishing or hunting guide for the estate, Mengues hooks and then loses a large trout, and the confrontation escalates from Gaelic epithets and an overturned boat to Mengues firing Angus. When the locals then refuse to work for him and his cattle roam unmanaged over the glen, Mengues, advised by Oliver "Nolly" Dukes (Archie Duncan), his factor from Glasgow whom the villagers distrust, closes a heavily used road that leads through his property.

By the time American widower, Major Jim "Lance" Lansing (Tucker), a former Air Force pilot who was stationed in Scotland during World War II, returns there, the disgruntled villagers are burning the laird in effigy. After a quick drink at the pub, where he befriends tinker and former paratrooper Malcolm MacFie (John McCallum), Lance reunites with his old friends the Carnochs, who act as guardians of Lance's young daughter Alsuin (Margaret McCourt), who adores Lance but is unaware that he is her father. Stricken with polio, the bedridden Alsuin is hard-hit by the closing of the road, which inspires her made-up fairy tales and provides people to call to her as they pass.

At her request, Lance, whom Alsuin calls "Sir Lancelot", proceeds to the Mengues estate to talk to the laird about the road. Finding the gate locked, he climbs the fence, but before approaching the castle, detours to the loch and takes a swim. Mengues' feisty daughter Marissa (Lockwood) spots him trespassing and steals his trousers while he is in the loch. Later, dressed in the clothes he has left, Lance shows up at the castle and manages to meet Mengues, who will only advise him, as a fellow foreigner, to "leave Scotland."

Lansing, however, rallies the people of the glen and eventually, they prevail upon Mengues to restore peace, but not before a brief and unconvincing fistfight between Lansing and Dukes. Mengues apologizes to all by explaining that he has recently learned the difference between a lord and a laird. A lord, he says, takes care of the people and land belonging to him, while a laird belongs to the land and the people.

With peace restored, the road re-opens, and during the wedding festivities of Lance and Marissa, Mengues, dressed in a kilt, promises Alsuin, who knows now that Lance is her father, that they both will be dancing within six months. Tinker chieftain Parlan (McLaglen) and Malcolm enjoy the party from the window, until they realize it is an excellent night for poaching.

== Cast ==
- Margaret Lockwood as Marissa Mengues
- Orson Welles as Sanin Cejador y Mengues
- Forrest Tucker as Major Lansing
- Victor McLaglen as Parlan MacFie
- John McCallum as Malcolm MacFie
- Eddie Byrne as Dinny Sullivan
- Archie Duncan as Oliver "Nolly" Dukes
- Gudrun Ure as Dandy Dinmont
- Moultrie Kelsall as Luke Carnoch
- Margaret McCourt as Alsuin
- Alex McCrindle as Keegan
- Mary Mackenzie as Kate Carnoch
- Peter Sinclair as Angus
- Jack Watling as Sammy Weller
- Grizelda Hervey as Sheilah
- Alastair Hunter as Policeman
- Michael Shepley as Man

== Production ==
The film was based on a novel by the writer of The Quiet Man which was published in 1950. Republic hoped that John Wayne would co-star with Margaret Lockwood. Screenwriter Frank S. Nugent, who also wrote Quiet Man, said the film wasn't a sequel to Quiet Man "but we're hoping to recapture the same flavour and warmth." The film was one of a series of movies that Wilcox and Republic intended to make together. Wilcox tried to get Cary Grant to do the film, then Mel Ferrer. It was Orson Welles' fifth British movie in six months. John McCallum was under contract to Herbert Wilcox.

Filming started 15 December 1953. It was shot at Elstree Studios. The film's sets were designed by the art director William C. Andrews.

== Box office ==
According to Kinematograph Weekly the film was a "money maker" at the British box office in 1954.

== Critical reception ==
The film received very poor reviews.

- The New York Times wrote, "The evident desire of its producer director, Herbert Wilcox, was to get a flavorsome regional entertainment about characters in the Scottish hills, comparable to the amiable treatise on the Irish that was attained in "The Quiet Man...But something went wrong in the fulfillment—something that smacks suspiciously of a dismal lack of humor in the characters, and a heavy directorial hand...Some pretty color shots of the Scottish country are dropped in and supposed to blend with some almost grotesque studio scenery. Synthetic—that's 'Trouble in the Glen'."
- On Film4.com, Richard Luck summarised, "Orson Welles' career was in pretty poor shape by 1954. Broke after self-financing Othello, the former wunderkind was obliged to take on any work that came his way...Far from Orson's finest day at the office."
- TV Guide wrote, "No one but Welles seems to take any real interest in what he's doing, and Welles, though he hams it up endearingly, sits under a bouffant hairdo that could make anyone look ridiculous."
- Allmovie wrote, "the scenes involving Tucker's polio-crippled daughter (Margaret McCourt) run the risk of sloppy sentiment, but are deftly handled by producer-director Wilcox."
