= Crabstane of Aberdeen =

Historic boundary marker in Aberdeen

Coordinates: 57.142919°N 2.108102°W

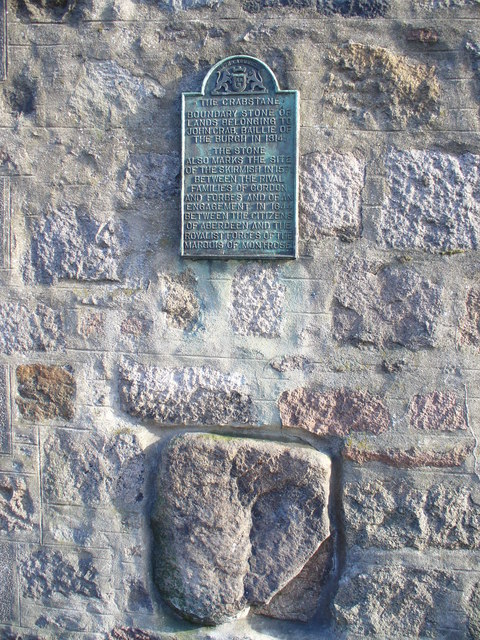
The Crabstane with the inscription plate above.

The Crabstane (alt. Crabs Stone, Craibstone, Craib Stone, Craibstane or Crabe Stone) is a boundary stone that used to mark out part of Craibstone Croft which was located near Hardgate, Aberdeen.

The stone has a plaque above it with the inscription as follows:

The Crabstane. Boundary stone on lands belonging to John Crab, Baillie of the Burgh in 1314.

The stone also marks the site of the skirmish in 1571 between the rival families of Gordon and Forbes and of an engagement in 1644 between the citizens of Aberdeen and the Royalist forces of the Marquis of Montrose.

The skirmish refers to the Battle of Craibstone on 20 November 1571.
