= Irish Republican Army and the Anglo-Irish Treaty =

Situation resulting from the IRA splitting along pro-treaty and anti-treaty lines

The Irish Republican Army was a guerrilla army that fought the Irish War of Independence against Britain from 1919 to 1921. It saw itself as the legitimate army of the Irish Republic declared in 1919. The Anglo-Irish Treaty, which ended this conflict, was a compromise which abolished the Irish Republic, but created the self-governing Irish Free State, within the British Empire. The IRA was deeply split over whether to accept the Treaty. Some accepted, whereas some rejected not only the Treaty but also the civilian authorities who had accepted it. This attitude eventually led to the outbreak of the Irish Civil War in late June 1922 between pro- and anti-Treaty factions.

== Reactions to the Treaty ==
The Anglo-Irish Treaty was signed on 6 December 1921 and narrowly ratified by Dáil Éireann (the Irish Parliament) on 7 January 1922.

Although the treaty was negotiated by Michael Collins, the de facto leader of the IRA, and had been approved by the Irish Republican Brotherhood, the IRA's senior ranking officers were deeply divided over the decision of the Dáil to ratify the treaty. Of the General Headquarters (GHQ) staff, nine members were in favour of the Treaty while four opposed it.

- Those who were pro-Treaty were Richard Mulcahy (Chief of Staff); Eoin O'Duffy (Deputy Chief of Staff); J. J. O'Connell (Assistant Chief of Staff); Gearóid O'Sullivan (Adjutant General); Sean McMahon (Quartermaster General); Michael Collins (Director of Intelligence); Diarmuid O'Hegarty (Director of Organisation); Emmet Dalton (Director of Training); Piaras Béaslaí (Director of Publicity).
- The anti-Treaty members were Rory O'Connor (Director of Engineering); Liam Mellows (Director of Purchases); Seán Russell (Director of Munitions) and Seamus O'Donovan (Director of Chemicals). Austin Stack, whose position on the GHQ staff was ambiguous after Brugha tried to foist him on GHQ, was also anti-Treaty.

== The stand-off begins ==
On 10 January, at least three anti-Treaty members of the IRA GHQ (one account claims four); six divisional commanders and the officers commanding the two Dublin brigades met to formulate their anti-Treaty strategy. They argued that the IRA's allegiance was to the Dáil of the Irish Republic and the decision of the Dáil to accept the Treaty meant that the IRA no longer owed that body its allegiance. They called for the IRA to withdraw from the authority of the Dáil and to entrust the IRA Executive with control over the army. The following day, this group issued Mulcahy with a letter requesting that an Army Convention be held on 5 February to discuss these proposals. The letter was signed by GHQ staff Rory O’Connor, Liam Mellows, Seán Russell, and Seamus O’Donovan, as well as Oscar Traynor, Liam Lynch and other IRA commandants.

On 13 January, Mulcahy replied to the anti-Treaty IRA officers to state that he would not call a convention without the authority of Dáil Éireann as the Government of the Republic. On the same day, Rory O’Connor wrote to Eoin O’Duffy stating that a convention would be called regardless. O'Connor added that O'Duffy's orders would only be obeyed by the anti-Treaty section provided they were countersigned by himself.

On 16 January, the first IRA division – the 2nd Southern Division – repudiated the authority of the GHQ.

On 18 January, Richard Mulcahy chaired a meeting of the GHQ Staff, divisional commandants and some brigade commandants. It agreed to hold an Army Convention within two months and that, in a meantime, a 'watchdog' committee, known as the Army Re-Unification Committee would be set up with representatives from both sides. This committee did not meet often, however and failed to heal the rift in the IRA.

A month later, on 18 February, Liam Forde, O/C of the IRA Mid-Limerick Brigade, issued a proclamation stating that: "We no longer recognise the authority of the present head of the army, and renew our allegiance to the existing Irish Republic". This was the first unit of the IRA to break with the pro-Treaty government.

On 24 February, the 'watchdog' committee established a month earlier met. Rory O'Connor requested Mulcahy to secure Dáil approval to hold an army convention on 26 March. Three days later on 27 February, the Dáil Cabinet sanctioned the Minister of Defence's request to hold an Army Convention. This decision was duly announced by IRA chief of staff, Eoin O’Duffy, who requested brigade conventions to assemble to elect delegates.

On 5 March, a stand-off developed between pro- and anti-IRA forces in Limerick over who would take control of a military barracks vacated by the departing British troops. A compromise was reached around 12/13 March to prevent fighting breaking out, but tensions remained high in the city.

== The Army Convention ==
Clearly concerned at developments in Ireland, and in Limerick in particular, on 14 March Winston Churchill wrote to Michael Collins, warning him that: "An adverse decision by the convention of the Irish Republican Army (so called) would, however, be a very grave event at the present juncture. I presume you are quite sure there is no danger of this". The following day, 15 March, the Dáil cabinet decided to prohibit the holding of the Army Convention scheduled to take place on 26 March. Amateur historian Dorothy Macardle claims that the banning of the convention arose because "Mulcahy realised that 70 to 80 per cent of the IRA was against the Treaty and he feared that the Convention could have been used to establish a military dictatorship". However, issuing a summons under the title Republican Military Council, 50 IRA senior officers including 4 GHQ staff, 5 divisional commanders and a number of brigade commandants, decided to go ahead with Convention.

On 22 March, Rory O'Connor held what was to become an infamous press conference at the headquarters of the republican party (Cumann na Poblachta) in Suffolk Street, Dublin. He declared that the army was "in a dilemma, having the choice of supporting its oath to the Republic or still giving allegiance to the Dáil, which, it considers, has abandoned the Republic. The contention of the army", he said, "is that the Dáil did a thing that it had no right to do." When asked if he would obey President Arthur Griffith, he said he would not as he had violated his oath. When asked if the army would forcibly prevent an election being held, O'Connor stated: "It will have the power to do so." He went on to say that "the holding of the Convention means that we repudiate the Dáil ... We will set up an Executive which will issue orders to the IRA all over the country." In reply to the question on "whether it can be taken that we are going to have a military dictatorship," O’Connor said: "You can take it that way if you like."He also explained how the English did not give the Irish any help.

On 23 March, Richard Mulcahy (Minister of Defence), in a letter to General O'Duffy, orders the suspension of any officer or man who takes part in the "sectional" Convention.

On 26 March, a Convention of (predominantly) anti-Treaty delegates met in the Mansion House, Dublin with between 220 and 223 delegates present. The convention passed a resolution saying that the Army "shall be maintained as the Army of the Irish Republic under an Executive appointed by the Convention". A temporary Executive of 16 members was elected headed by Liam Lynch and including Rory O’Connor, Liam Mellows and Ernie O'Malley. The convention adjourned until 9 April.

On 28 March, the (anti-Treaty) IRA Executive issued statement stating that Minister of Defence (Mulcahy) and the Chief-of-Staff (O’Duffy) no longer exercised any control over the IRA. In addition, it ordered an end to the recruitment to the new military and police forces of the Provisional Government. Furthermore, it instructed all IRA units to reaffirm their allegiance to the Irish Republic on 2 April.

On 9 April, the (anti-Treaty) Army Convention reconvened in Dublin. It adopted a new constitution and elected a new 16-member Executive composed the following members: Liam Lynch (Cork), Frank Barrett (Clare), Liam Deasy (Cork), Tom Hales (Cork), Tom Maguire (Mayo), Joseph McKelvey (Belfast), Liam Mellows (Galway), Rory O'Connor (Dublin?), Peadar O'Donnell (Donegal), Florence O'Donoghue (Cork), Sean O'Hegarty (Cork), Ernie O'Malley (Dublin), Séumas Robinson (Tipperary), Joe O'Connor (?), Sean Moylan (Cork), and P.J. Ruttledge (Mayo). When the Executive met, it elected Liam Lynch as new IRA chief of staff and appointed a seven-member Army Council. Barry's Hotel in Gardiner Row was made (anti-Treaty) IRA headquarters.

== The Four Courts occupation and the outbreak of civil war ==
On 14 April, about 200 of the anti-Treaty IRA men in Dublin seized the Four Courts building and several other buildings in the city centre. They were hoping to provoke the remaining British troops in Ireland (numbering 5,000 men in Dublin) into attacking them – hoping that this would restart the war, wreck the Treaty and re-unite the IRA. The Provisional Government wanted to await the result of the 1922 general election on 16 June, which proved favourable to it, but was continually criticized and ignored by the anti-Treaty side.

The Provisional government was then pressured into dealing with the Four Courts garrison by the British. Michael Collins in particular was very reluctant to do this and it was not until the Four Courts men kidnapped JJ O'Connell in late June that he decided to act. At this time, the executive of the anti-Treaty IRA under Liam Lynch had disowned the Four Courts men for their provocative behaviour. On 28 June 1922, Collin's Free State troops opened fire on the Four Courts with borrowed British artillery. Fighting broke out in Dublin and the anti-Treaty IRA took the side of the Four Courts men. Michael Collins was killed on 22 August 1922 at the village of Béal na Bláth. The Civil War lasted until May 1923, when the IRA called a ceasefire and dumped its arms.
