= Maurice Walsh =

Irish writer

- Born: 2 May 1879; Lisselton, County Kerry, Ireland
- Died: 18 February 1964 (aged 84); Blackrock, Dublin, Ireland
- Occupation: Writer
- Writing career
- Genres: historical fiction, myth and legend
- Notable works: The Key above the Door; "The Quiet Man" (short story, included in Green Rushes); Blackcock's Feather

Maurice Walsh (2 May 1879 – 18 February 1964) was an Irish novelist, now best known for his short story "The Quiet Man", later made into the Oscar-winning film The Quiet Man, directed by John Ford and starring John Wayne and Maureen O'Hara. He was one of Ireland's best-selling authors in the 1930s.

A new musical based on his novel, Castle Gillian, was adapted by Victor Kazan (book and lyrics), Kevin Purcell (music). Castle Gillian: An Irish Tale had its world-premiere in Dublin at the Smock Alley Theatre, 25-26 April 2025 presented by Entr'acte produced in association with Quill & Quaver Associates.

== Life ==
Maurice Walsh was born on or about 21 April 1879, in the townland of Ballydonoghue, near Lisselton, County Kerry, Ireland. He was the third of ten children and the first son born to John Walsh, a local farmer, and his wife, Elizabeth Buckley, who lived in a three-roomed thatched farmhouse.

View of Listowel, the River Feale, and racetrack, near Ballydonoghue, Walsh's birthplace; his work often reflected a rural Ireland that was fast disappearing in the 1930s.

His father was politically involved in the National Land League but his main interests were books and horses and he employed others to work the farm. One of these farmhands was called Paddy Bawn Enright, whose name was later used in the short story "The Quiet Man", although it was changed for the movie version. John Walsh passed on to his son a love of books, as well as Irish legends and folk tales and the theory of place which features in much of his work.

Walsh produced some 20 novels, plus a large number of short stories, many set in Scotland or the West of Ireland and containing a mix of drama and romance. Much of his work invoked a rural Ireland that was fast disappearing in the 1930s and proved immensely popular, being translated into Italian, Danish, French, German and Flemish.

In 1908, he married Caroline Begg, always referred to by her nickname "Toshon", who came from Dufftown, Banffshire, in Scotland; they had three sons, Ian, Neil and Maurice, and two daughters, Molly and Elizabeth, both of whom died young. One of his grandsons is Irish painter Manus Walsh. Caroline predeceased him in January 1941; Walsh himself died on February 18, 1964, in Blackrock, Dublin, and was buried in the Esker cemetery at Lucan, Dublin. The then President of Ireland, Éamon de Valera, attended his funeral Mass.

== Career ==
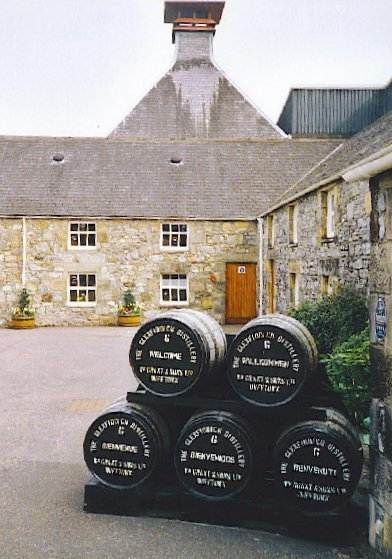
Glenfiddich Distillery, Dufftown; while in the Excise Service, Walsh was based in the area to monitor compliance.

Walsh went to school in nearby Lisselton, later attending St Michael's College in Listowel to prepare for the Civil Service examination. He entered the Customs and Excise Service in 1901 as an Assistant Revenue Officer and after an initial posting in Limerick, was sent to Scotland; with the exception of 1909-1913 when he was based in Ireland, he spent much of his British service in the Highlands, where his job involved monitoring whisky distilleries in Speyside. This was where he met Scots novelist Neil Gunn, who also worked in the Excise Service and became a close friend.

In 1908, Walsh sold two stories to the Irish Emerald, a Dublin magazine containing a mix of stories by Irish writers with articles on Irish history and language. In 1912, this combined with The Shamrock to form The Shamrock and Irish Emerald before folding in 1919. One of these stories was "Eudmon Blake; or, The sack of Athenree", which he later used as the basis for his 1932 novel Blackcock's Feather.

In 1922, Walsh transferred to the Excise service of the newly formed Irish Free State and moved to Dublin, where he joined Comhaltas Cana, the Irish customs officers association, and wrote for its journal Irisleabhar. The founding of the Free State split the nationalist movement and led to the 1922-1923 Irish Civil War; as a result, Walsh left his family in Scotland until it was safe for them to join him in 1923.

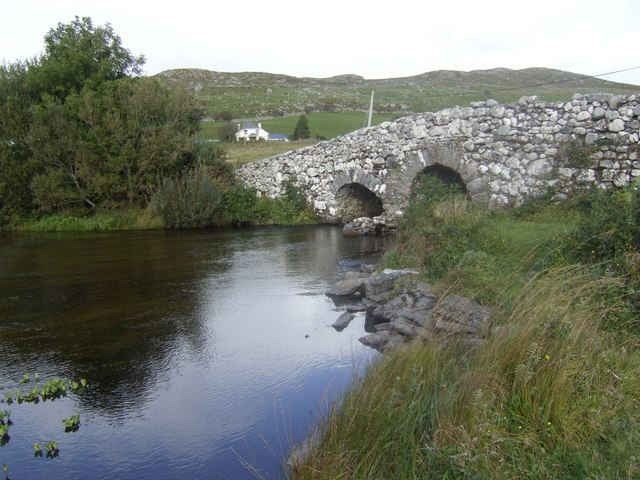
Bridge used in the 1952 film of Walsh's best-known short story, "The Quiet Man"

During this enforced separation, Walsh wrote his first novel, The Key Above the Door, as an entry in a new novel competition. Although it failed to win, it was first serialised in Chambers' Journal, then published as a book in July 1926 by W & R Chambers and ultimately sold over 250,000 copies. Over the next decade, several short stories were printed in The Dublin Magazine, a journal founded in 1925 featuring Irish authors, including Samuel Beckett, and the poet Austin Clarke. From 1930, others were placed in Capuchin Annual, while his book sales grew steadily, especially after an unsolicited letter of praise for The Key Above the Door from J. M. Barrie, author of Peter Pan. Chambers subsequently used this testimonial to promote his other books.

In 1932, Walsh published Blackcock's Feather, which was later translated into Irish as Cleite chiarchoiligh for use in schools. He retired from government service the next year to become a full-time writer and shortly after sold his short story, "The Quiet Man", to The Saturday Evening Post, a US weekly that published F Scott Fitzgerald among others. The story was included in the collection published in 1935 as Green Rushes; several of these were considerably darker than his other work and feature Hugh Forbes, an IRA member during the Irish War of Independence. This character appears in "The Small Dark Man" and "The Prudent Man" published in Green Rushes and Son of a Tinker, respectively; the director John Ford gave Forbes a brief cameo in the 1952 film The Quiet Man, although he does not appear in Walsh's story.

Walsh became President of the Irish branch of PEN in 1938, visiting the United States that year as the Irish delegate; when World War II began in 1939, his article in defence of Irish neutrality, "Ireland in a Warring Europe", was published in The Saturday Evening Post. After the war, he published several collections of short stories, the most popular being those featuring Tomasheen James, a figure allegedly based on Paddy Bawn Enright.

Several of his works were made into films or plays, most notably the 1952 Oscar-winner The Quiet Man, but also a 1954 film loosely based on Trouble in the Glen; the film was poorly received while the experience allegedly put Walsh off Hollywood for good. A number of other works, including Blackcock's Feather, were serialised on the radio. A musical based on "The Quiet Man" called Donnybrook was produced in 1960 but flopped; another has been developed, based on his novel Castle Gillian.

== Assessment ==
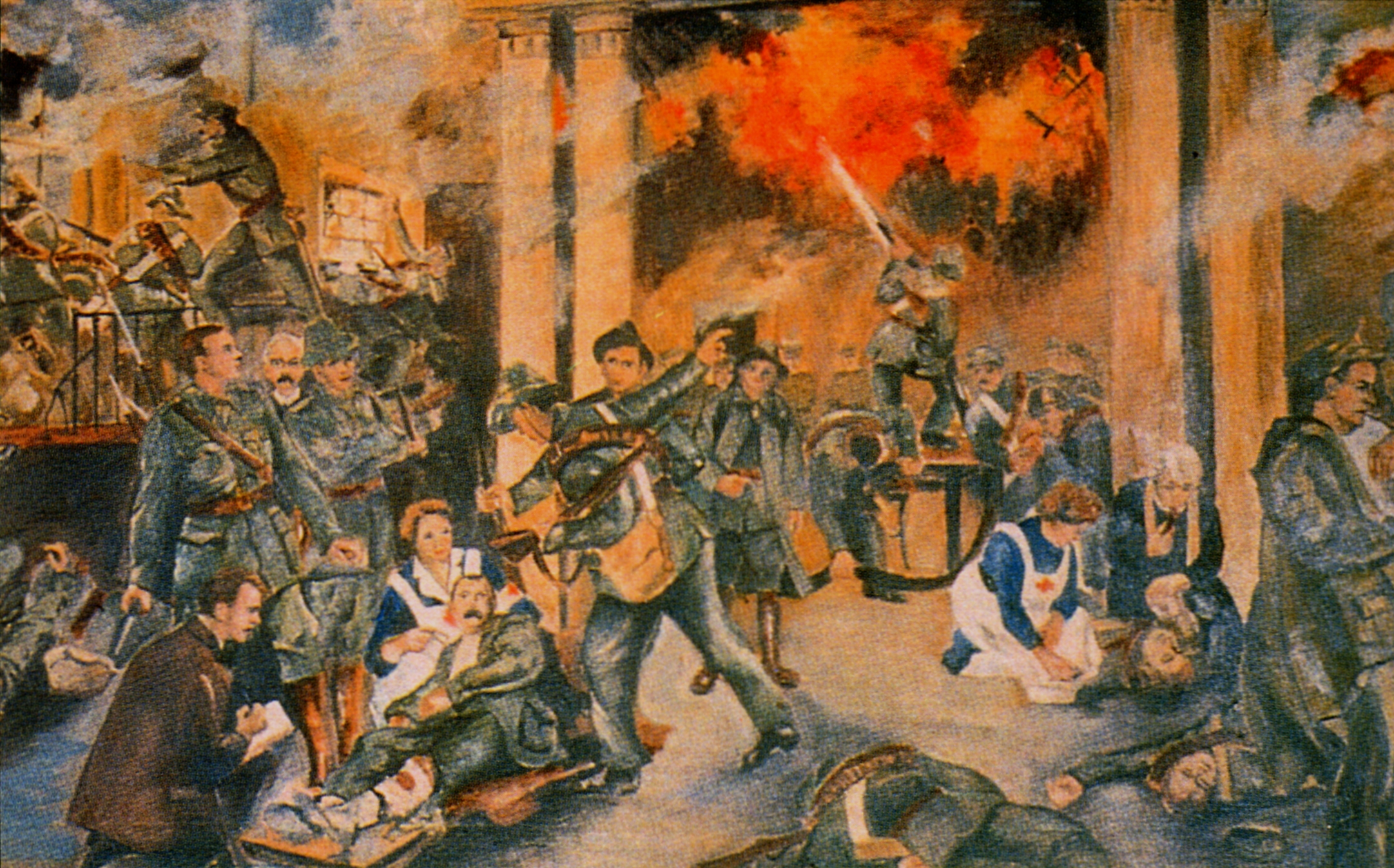
GPO in the 1916 Rising. 'A terrible beauty was born' (WB Yeats); the apogee of Irish Romantic nationalism (illustration by Walter Paget)

Walsh is remembered today primarily for his short story "The Quiet Man", but in the 1930s and 1940s, he was one of Ireland's best selling authors. His admirers are said to have included Ernest Hemingway, while his historical novels were set in periods and perspectives less well-known today. The 1932 work Blackcock's Feather covers the 1594-1603 Nine Years War, while the 1937 novel And No Quarter follows the 1644-1645 campaigns of Montrose from the perspective of his Irish troops. Sons of the Swordmaker goes back to the first century BCE; it also features common links between Scotland and Ireland, while the second half is a re-working of the Irish saga The Destruction of Da Derga's Hall.

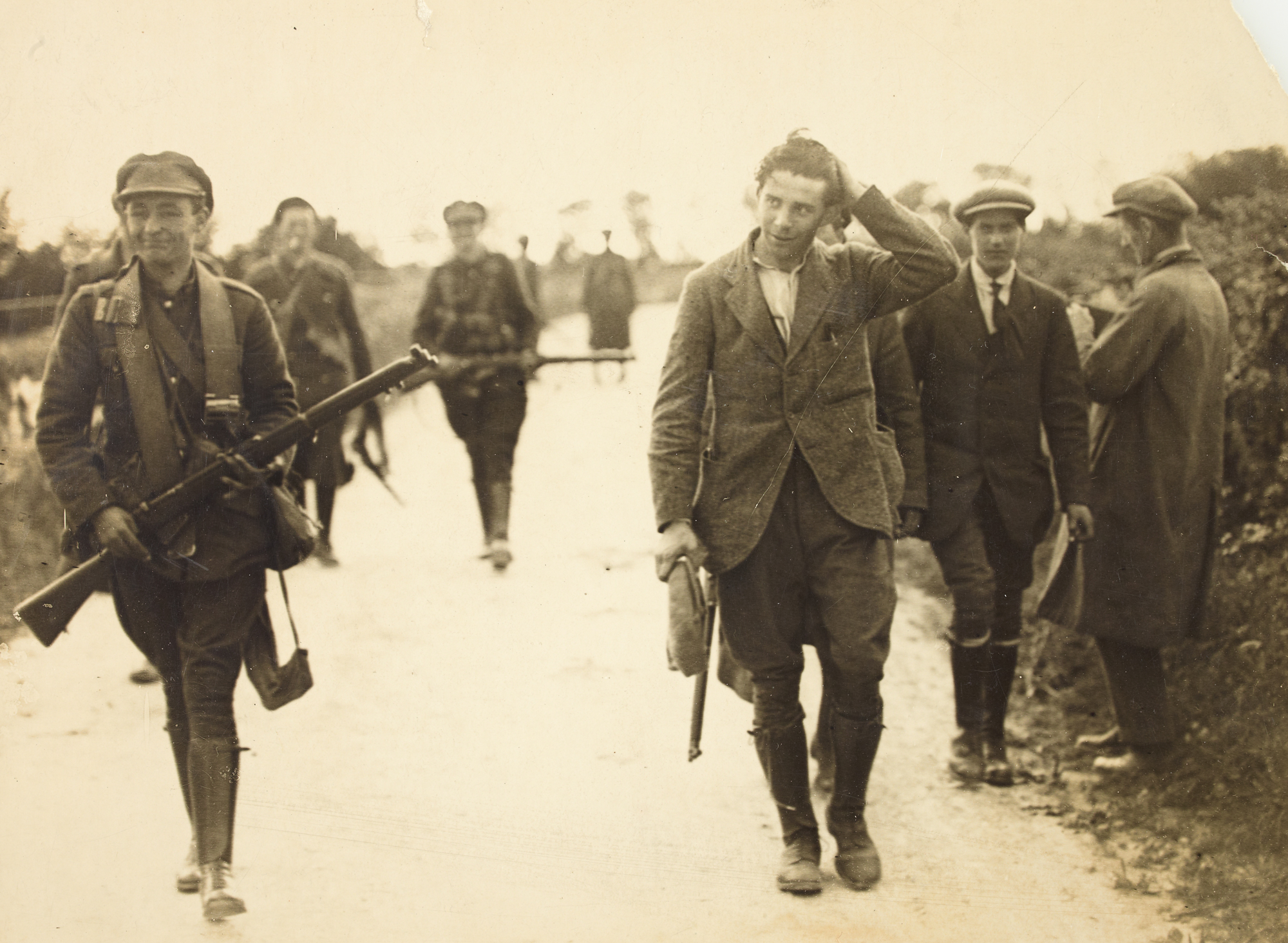
Free State soldiers with an Anti-Treaty prisoner during the 1923-1924 Civil War; Walsh's writing emphasised what united the Irish and their neighbours

Much of his work was produced in the aftermath of the 1923-1924 Irish Civil War, fought with particular bitterness in his home county of Kerry. This included its most notorious atrocity at Ballyseedy; nine Anti-Treaty prisoners were tied to a landmine, which was then detonated, killing all but one who was miraculously blown clear.

Like other Irish writers of his era, such as W. B. Yeats, Walsh was influenced by Romantic nationalism and the ideas of Johann Gottfried von Herder (1744–1803), who argued nationality was the product of climate, geography and 'more particularly, languages, inclinations and characters.' This meant being Irish was not a function of race, politics or religion but a shared physical and cultural landscape, an idea with enormous appeal in the divided Ireland of the late 1920s and 1930s.

This is reflected in Walsh's style which the poet Seamus Heaney described as being "an atmosphere, a sense of bogs and woods". In his novels, he appeals to the idea of a united Gaeldom and a united Ireland, regardless of nationality or religion; And No Quarter is set within Montrose's combined Scottish-Irish army, while the hero Martin Somers is an Englishman and member of the Protestant Church of Ireland, which in 2016 still had over 126,400 members in Eire. The five stories in Green Rushes that include "The Quiet Man" share a common theme of IRA members coming to terms with their memories of the fighting.

However, it has been argued that after 1922, '...Romantic Nationalism, having served its purpose, became an irrelevance, even an encumbrance, in the troubled future course of Irish history.' Walsh's style and approach fell out of fashion in the 1950s.

He is listed in the 1948 publication Catholic Authors: Contemporary Biographical Sketches, 1930-1952, Volume 1 and is also included in the Macmillan Dictionary of Irish Literature.

== Books ==
- The Key Above the Door (1926)
- While Rivers Run (1928)
- The Small Dark Man (1929)
- Blackcock's Feather (1932)
- The Road to Nowhere (1934); poaching and romance in the Scottish Highlands;
- Green Rushes, incorporating The Quiet Man and other related stories (1935)
- And No Quarter (1937)
- Sons of the Swordmaker (1938);
- The Hill Is Mine (1940)
- Son of Apple (1940), An old Irish Folk-Story retold from a translation by Catriona MacLeod
- Thomasheen James, Man-of-no-Work (1941)
- The Spanish Lady (1943)
- The Man in Brown (Nine Strings To Your Bow in the USA) (1945)
- Castle Gillian (1948); follows the fortunes of two couples running an Irish racing stable;
- Trouble in the Glen (movie adaptation) (1950)
- Son of a Tinker, a collection of short stories (1951)
- The Honest Fisherman, ditto (1953)
- A Strange Woman's Daughter (1954)
- Danger Under the Moon (1956)
- The Smart Fellow, a collection of short stories (1964)

== Sources ==
- Allen, Richard and Regan, Stephen; Irelands of the Mind: Memory and Identity in Modern Irish Culture; (Cambridge Scholars Publishing, 2008);
- D C Browning (compiled after J W Cousin), "Walsh, Maurice", Everyman's Dictionary of Literary Biography, English and American, Everyman's Reference Library, Revised Edition, J M Dent & Sons Ltd, 1960, pages 713 and 714
- Hoehn, Mathew; Catholic Authors: Contemporary Biographical Sketches, 1930-1952, Volume 1; (St Mary, 1948);
- MacMahon, Bryan; Macmillan Dictionary of Irish Literature; (Macmillan, 1985);
- Matheson, Steve; Maurice Walsh, Storyteller; (Brandon Book Publishers, 1985);
- McNee, Gerry; In the Footsteps of the Quiet Man: The Inside Story of the Cult Film; (Mainstream Publishing, 2008);
