= Sir William Rollo =

Sir William Rollo or Rollock (died 24 October 1645) was a Scottish Royalist soldier of the Wars of the Three Kingdoms.

== Life ==
He was the fifth son of Andrew Rollo of Duncruib (Duncrub), Perthshire, who was created 10 January 1651, by Charles II while in Scotland, the first Lord Rollo of Duncruib; his mother was Catherine Drummond, fourth daughter of James Drummond, 1st Lord Madderty. He suffered from a congenital lameness, but enjoyed a high reputation as a soldier. His elder brother James Rollo, 2nd Lord Rollo was a follower of the Marquess of Argyll, on his galley around the time of the Battle of Inverlochy; but William Rollo was a royalist.

While Rollo was serving in England as captain in General James King's lifeguards in 1644, Montrose's recruited him for service in Scotland. When they reached Carlisle, Rollo and Lord Ogilvie were sent forward for covert reconnaissance. Their report was negative, and so Montrose, with Rollo and Colonel William Sibbald, journeyed north to the Highlands disguised as a groom. Rollo held under Montrose the rank of major, and commanded the left wing at the Battle of Aberdeen. After the action he was sent from Kintore with despatches to the king at Oxford.

An unconfirmed story of George Wishart had Rollo captured by Argyll on this mission, and released on condition that he would assassinate Montrose. Rollo was in any case present at the Battle of Alford on 2 July 1645, sharing the command of the left wing with James Gordon, 2nd Viscount Aboyne. He accompanied Montrose on his march southwards, and is credited with putting to flight two hundred covenanting horse with only ten men during the march through Fife. He was taken prisoner at the Battle of Philiphaugh on 13 September 1645, and was executed at the market cross of Glasgow on 24 October.

== Notes ==
Attribution

This article incorporates text from a publication now in the public domain: Lee, Sidney, ed. (1897). "Rollo, William". Dictionary of National Biography. Vol. 49. London: Smith, Elder & Co.
