= Lord Newark =

The title Lord Newark was a Lordship of Parliament in the Peerage of Scotland, created in 1661 and extinct in 1694, though the title continued to be claimed until the 19th century.

== David Leslie, 1st Lord Newark ==
David Leslie was fifth son of Patrick Leslie, Commendator of Lindores. A Covenanter general, he was created Lord Newark on 31 August 1661, with further remainder to the heirs male of his body. He died in February 1682 and was succeeded by his son David. Along with three other daughters who died unmarried, he was also father of Elizabeth, who married Sir Archibald Kennedy, 1st Baronet, of Culzean; Mary, who married firstly Sir Francis Kinloch, 2nd Baronet, of Gilmerton, and secondly Sir Alexander Ogilvy, 1st Baronet, of Forglen; and Margaret, who married James Campbell, fourth son of Archibald Campbell, 9th Earl of Argyll.

== David Leslie, 2nd Lord Newark ==
David Leslie was only son of the first Lord Newark. On 16 August 1672, as Master of Newark, he had a charter of the barony of Abercrombie, which his father had purchased along with St Monans from Lord Abercrombie. He succeeded to his father's place in Parliament, but was fined for absence in 1693. He died the following year on 15 May 1694, when his peerage became extinct, though his eldest daughter assumed the title. His other daughters by his wife Elizabeth, daughter of Sir Thomas Stewart of Grandtully, included Grizel, who married Thomas Drummond of Logiealmond, and Christian, who married Thomas Graham of Balgowan.

== Jean Leslie, styled Lady Newark ==
Jean Leslie was the eldest daughter of the second Lord Newark. By contract of 8 March 1694 she was married to Sir Alexander Anstruther of Anstruther. Her father died that year and she assumed the title Lady Newark on the grounds that her grandfather had obtained a regrant of the peerage in 1672 with remainder, failing the heirs-male of his body, to the heirs-male and -female of his son's daughters, then to his brothers Charles and James and the heirs-male of their bodies. She died on 21 February 1740, leaving several children who bore her surname of Leslie.

== William Leslie, styled Lord Newark ==
William Leslie was the eldest son of Jean Leslie and Sir Alexander Anstruther, and assumed the title Lord Newark on his mother's death. He served as a captain in John Jordan's regiment of marines until 1749, then was made Captain of an Independent Company of Invalids on 20 October 1755. He voted as Lord Newark at elections of Scottish representative peer until 2 January 1771, when his vote was objected to because he was not the heir-male of the first Lord. He died unmarried on 5 February 1773.

== Alexander Leslie, styled Lord Newark ==
Alexander Leslie was the third son of Jean Leslie and Sir Alexander Anstruther. A merchant at Boulogne, he assumed the title of Lord Newark on his brother's death. He voted at the election of Scottish representative peers in 1774 without opposition, but at the election in 1790 his vote was opposed because he was not the heir-male of the first Lord. His claim to be Lord Newark was not established before he died on 10 March 1791. His children included an eldest son John, who inherited the claim, and a second son Philip, who eloped in 1776 with Frances, wife of George Carpenter, 2nd Earl of Tyrconnell and daughter of John Manners, Marquess of Granby.

== John Leslie, styled Lord Newark ==
John Leslie was the eldest son of Alexander by his wife Elizabeth Prince. A soldier, he was appointed Lieutenant-Colonel in the Army on 19 February 1783 and Major in the 3rd Regiment of Foot on 30 November 1784. He assumed the title of Lord Newark on his father's death, but in 1793 the House of Lords held that the charter of 1672 by which his father had claimed the peerage was a forgery. He nevertheless continued to use the title, and was promoted to Lieutenant-Colonel of the 3rd Foot on 26 November 1793 and an aide-de-camp to the King on 21 December that year. Following his death on 12 June 1818 no further claim was made to the peerage.

== See also ==
- Newark Castle, Fife
- Viscount Newark
