= Sanda Island =

Island in Argyll and Bute, Scotland

Sandaigh/?Abhainn (Gaelic)

Location
- Sanda Island shown within Argyll and Bute
- OS grid reference: NR730043
- Coordinates: 55.28°N 5.58°W

Name
- Name meaning: Sandy Island (Norse)
- Old Norse name: Sandey/Havn

Physical geography
- Island group: Firth of Clyde
- Area: 127 hectares (0.49 sq mi)
- Area rank: 131
- Highest elevation: 123 metres (404 ft)

Administration
- Council area: Argyll and Bute
- Country: Scotland
- Sovereign state: United Kingdom

Sanda Island (Scottish Gaelic: Sandaigh) is a small island in the Firth of Clyde, off of Argyll and Bute, Scotland, near the southern tip of the Kintyre peninsula, near Southend and Dunaverty Castle.

On clear days Sanda can be seen from the southern tip of the Kintyre peninsula, from the Isle of Arran and from northeast County Antrim. It is known locally on Arran and on the Antrim coast as "Spoon Island" because of its resemblance to an upturned spoon.

== Population ==
In the 2001 census Sanda was one of four Scottish islands with a population of just one person. However, since then there has been some development, and in 2008 the island had a population of 3. In August 2008, as a result of their separation, the husband and wife owners put the island up for sale at a price of £3.2 million, and in January 2009 they announced that a sole caretaker would be resident until spring viewings re-commenced. The island was eventually sold to Swiss businessman Michi Meier for the reduced price of £2.5 million. The island's growth as a tourist destination may come to an end under the new owner, who has stated that he wants the island for personal use. By the time of the 2011 census, it had no usual residents.

== Wildlife ==
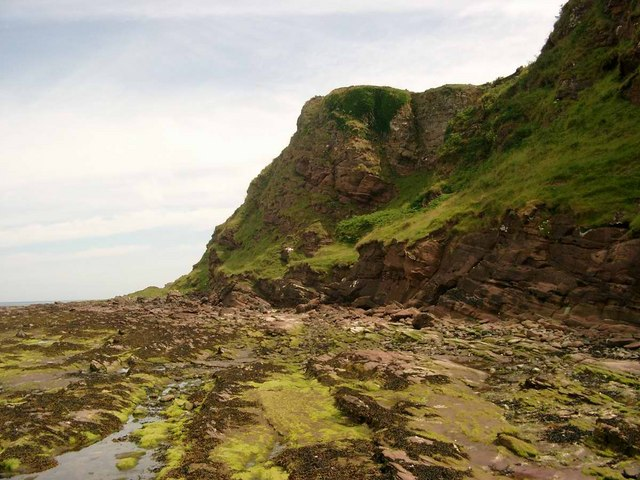
A view of the coast of Sanda

The island is designated a Site of Special Scientific Interest for its importance for both migrating and breeding birds. Sanda Bird Observatory was the first bird observatory to be set up on the west coast of Scotland.

== Geography and geology ==
According to Haswell-Smith, the island's geology is "lower old red sandstone in red and yellow varieties, and undifferentiated schists."

Sanda lies in the Straits of Moyle (Scottish Gaelic: Sruth na Maoile) between Scotland and Ireland. It is part of a mini-archipelago to the southeast of the Mull of Kintyre, at the far end of the Firth of Clyde. The other islands are Glunimore and Sheep Island, to the north east. Located on the north shore of Sanda is the Oitir Buidhe (yellow sand spit), a pronounced area of sand exposed at low tide, that has two slipways. To the east there is also the notorious "ship catcher", Paterson's Reef.

The island has cliffs on most sides. There are caves on the west coast, and also a couple of natural arches, particularly near "the Ship" as the lighthouse is nicknamed. There are two main hills, in the north west and south east. In between them is a valley which has the double advantage of being sheltered from the prevailing winds and catching the heat of the sun.

== History ==
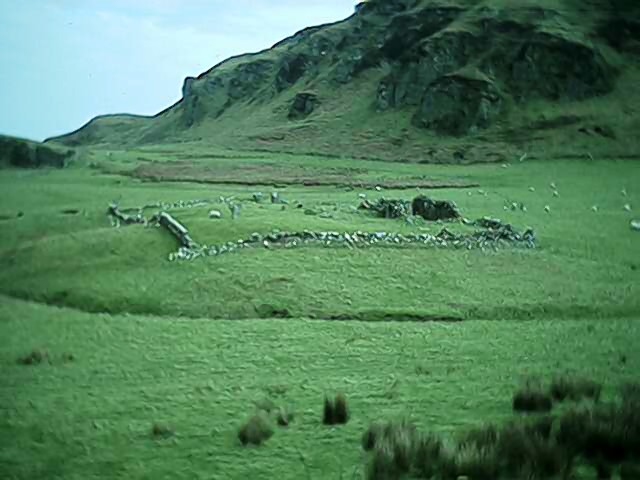
The chapel and cemetery on Sanda

The island has connections with several well-known historical personages, including the Bruce family, Wallace and Saint Ninian, the first evangeliser north of Hadrian's Wall.

The island is known for the ruins of a chapel built by Saint Ninian, for its Celtic crosses and its reputed holy well. It is said that Ninian was buried here, and indeed, the island was in possession of the Priory of Whithorn in Galloway until the Reformation. It is said that Ninian's grave was marked by an alder tree, and that whoever stepped on it would die.

It was known as "Sandey" (sandy island) by the Norse. This probably refers to the Oitir Buidhe which lies on the north shore of Sanda facing Sheep Island. Another name that appears to have attached itself to the island is Havoin (and numerous variants such as "Aven", "Avona"), which was recorded amongst the "Danish" by Dean Monro in his 16th century Description of the Western Isles of Scotland. This is cognate with the English "haven", and probably refers to the anchorage on the north coast, alternatively, but much less likely, as Haswell-Smith suggests, this could also be a reference to the Scottish Gaelic "abhainn" which means a river.

In the Middle Ages, there was some association with the Bruce family, notably, Robert the Bruce and his brother Edward. Edward lends his name to "Prince Edward's Rock", which is just south of Sanda Lighthouse, and which is nothing to do with Bonnie Prince Charlie, as sometimes thought. Robert was once forced to flee there, en route to Ireland after being pursued by the English navy. He has been sheltering with sympathisers at nearby Dunaverty Castle, on Kintyre in 1306, but was forced to leave. He later sheltered at Rathlin Island, which is less than twenty nautical miles (forty kilometres) away, and which is where he was said to have seen the legendary spider in the cave. In the south are "Wallace's Rocks" which may be linked in legend to William Wallace.

In the later 16th and 17th centuries, the island was connected with the MacDonalds of Kintyre, who sided with Montrose Colkitto married a MacDonald of Sanda; those MacDonalds were also caught up in related fighting from the 1630s onwards, and lost their position as a result of the Dunaverty Massacre.

The Annual Reports of the Fishery Board for Scotland provide an insight into the state of fishing from Sanda in the years before the First World War. The catch typically consisted of saithe and shellfish.

Fishery Statistics

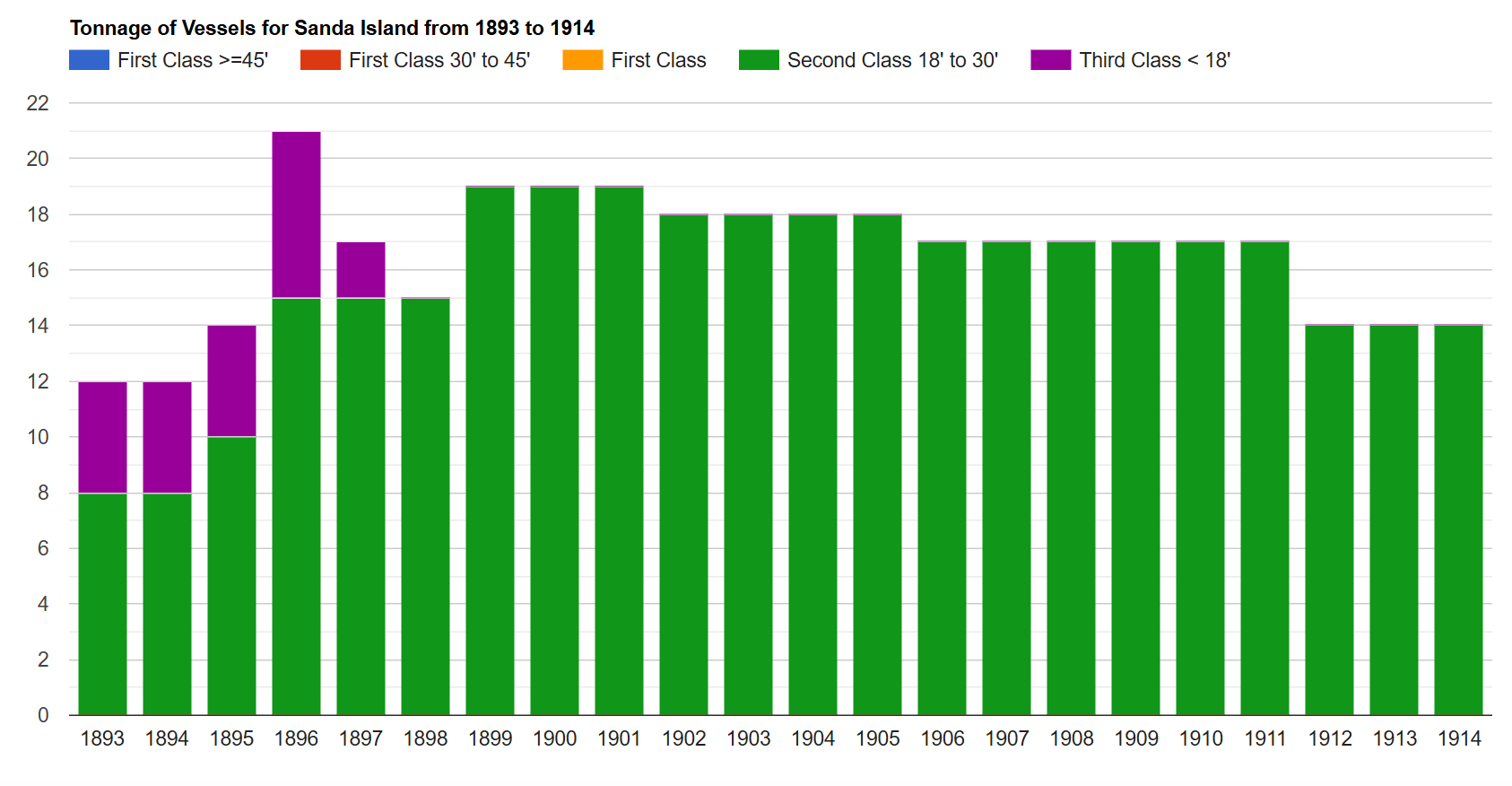
Tonnage of vessels

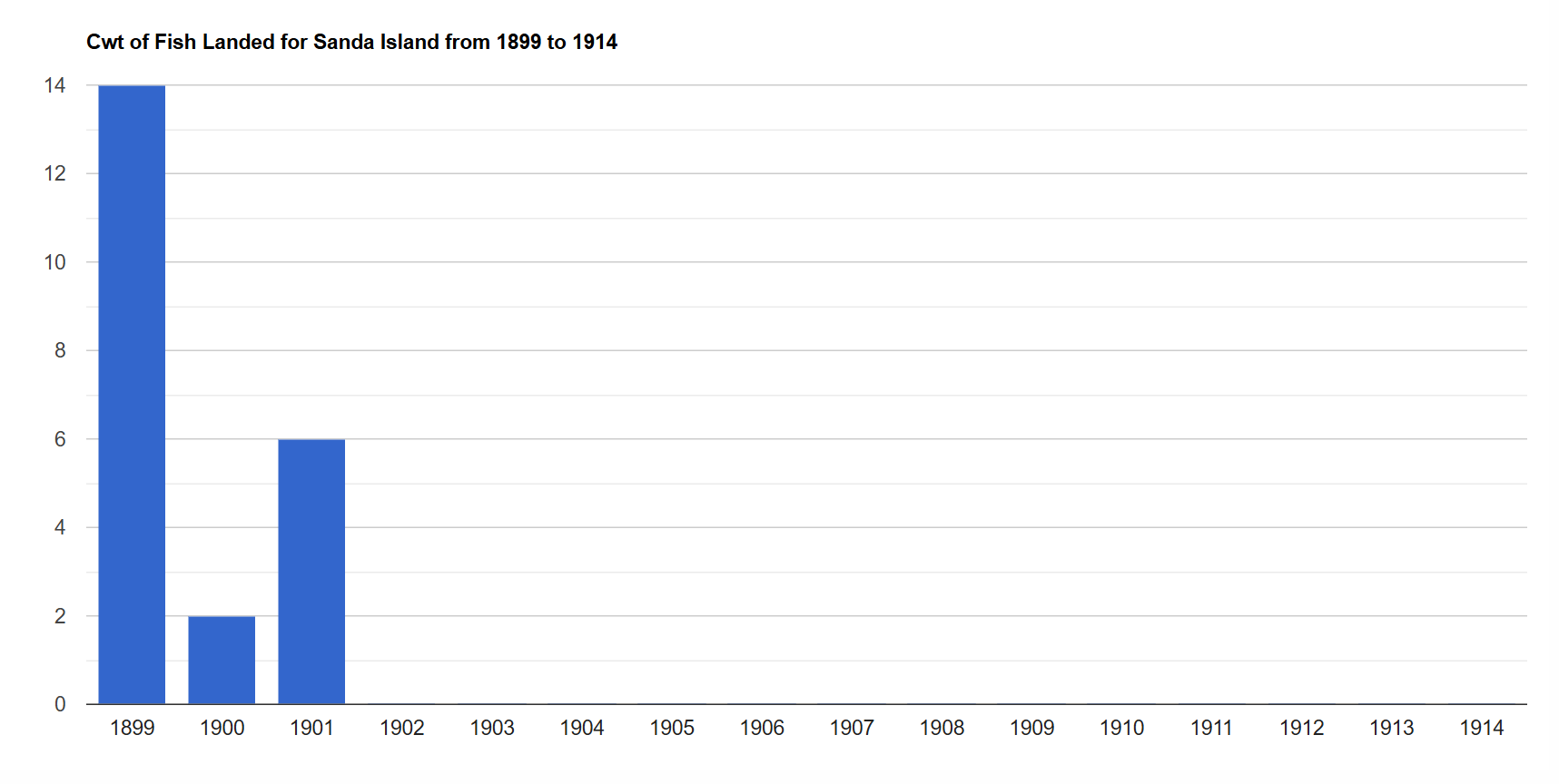
Cwt of fish landed

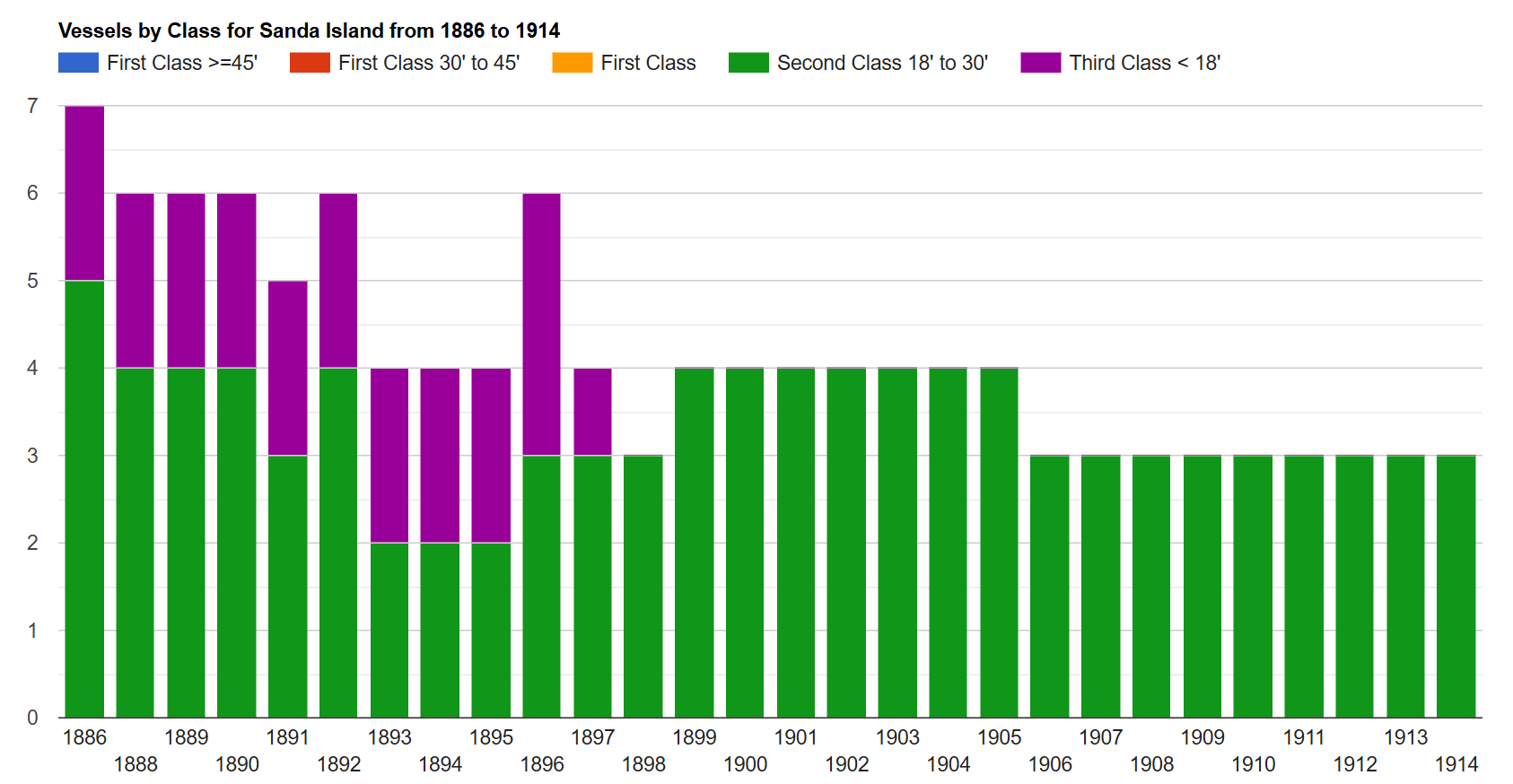
Vessels by class

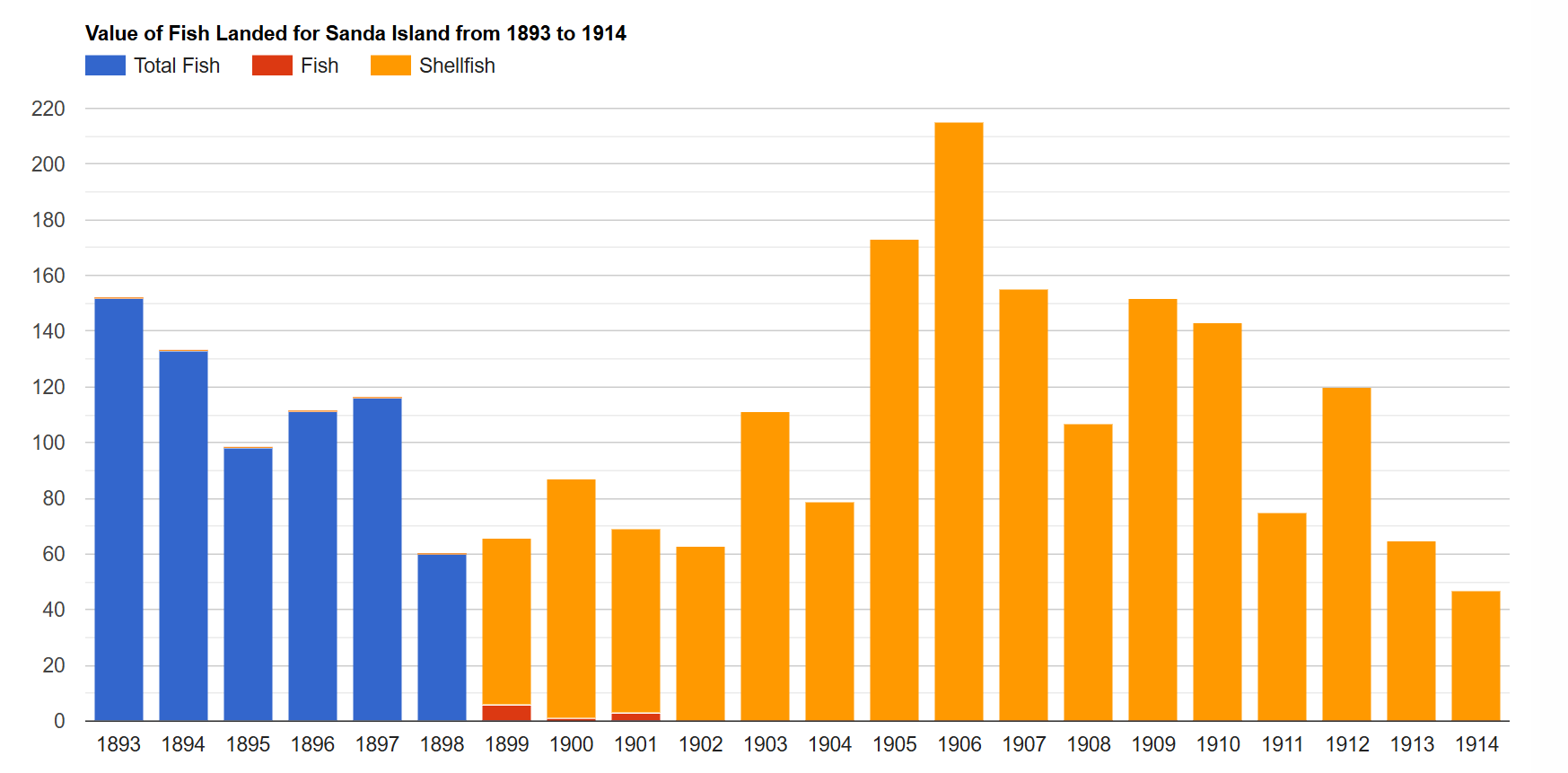
Value (£) of fish landed

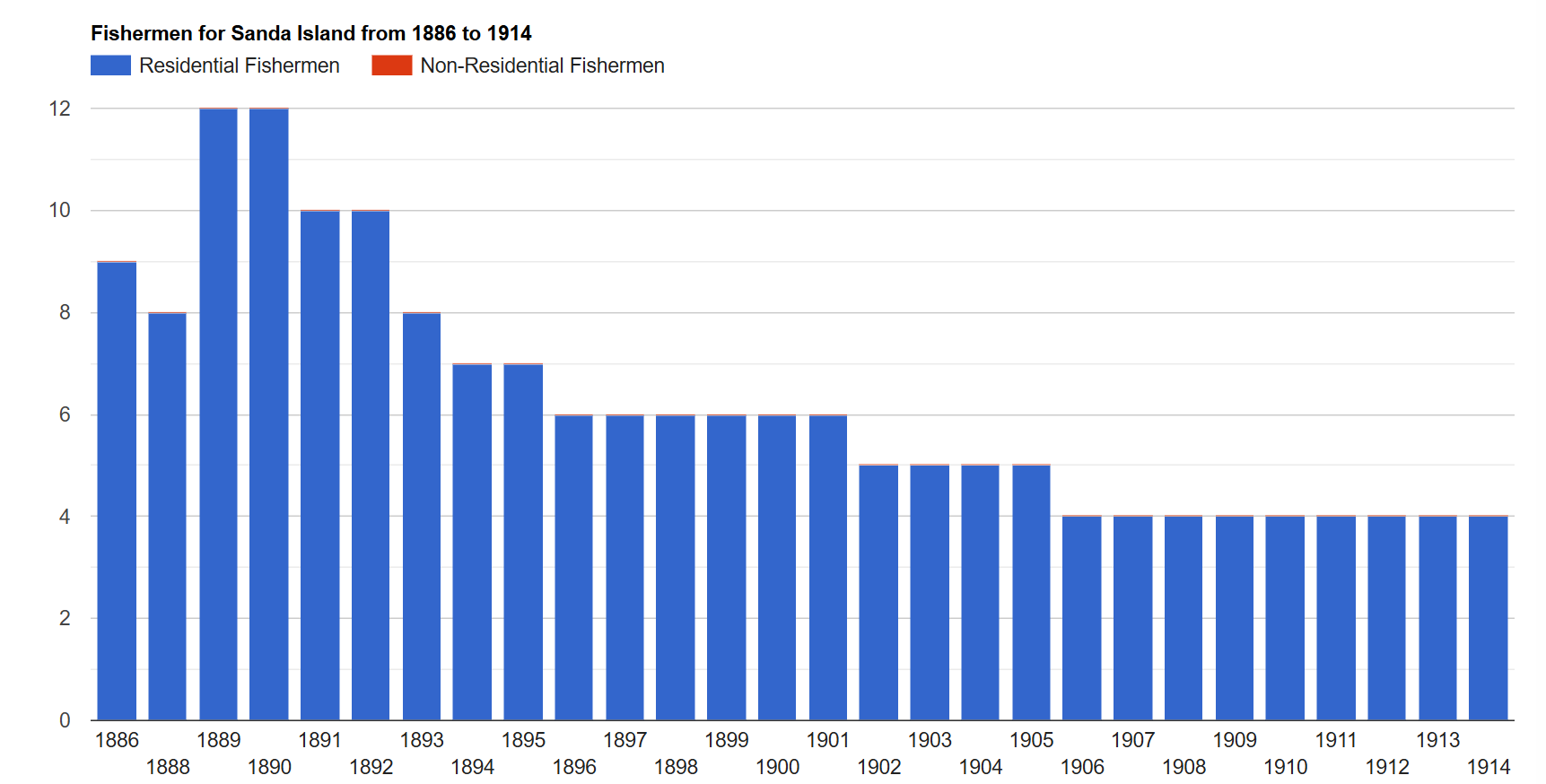
Fishermen

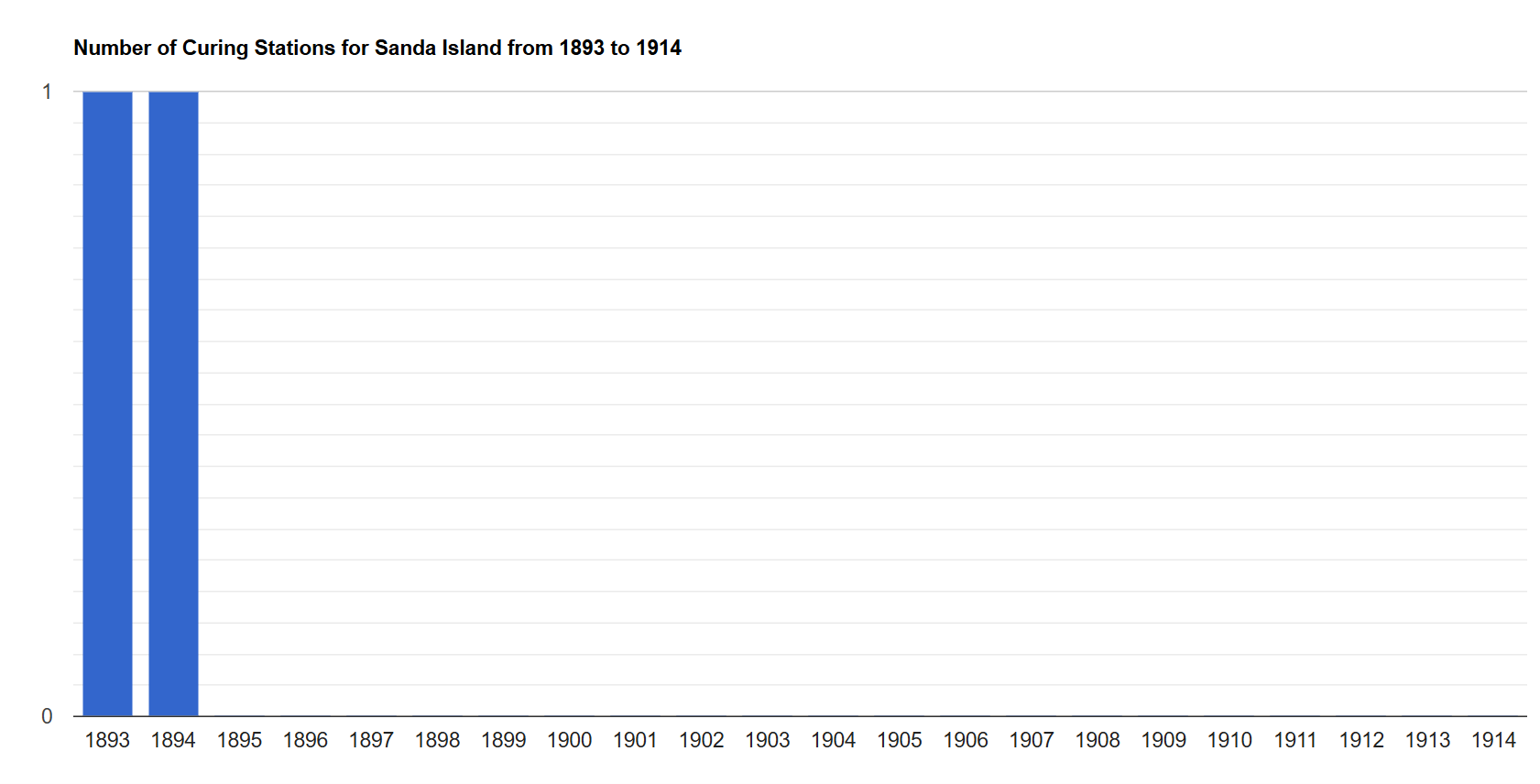
Number of curing stations

The island has had a number of different owners in its history, including, in 1969, Jack Bruce of the rock group Cream.

== Lighthouse ==
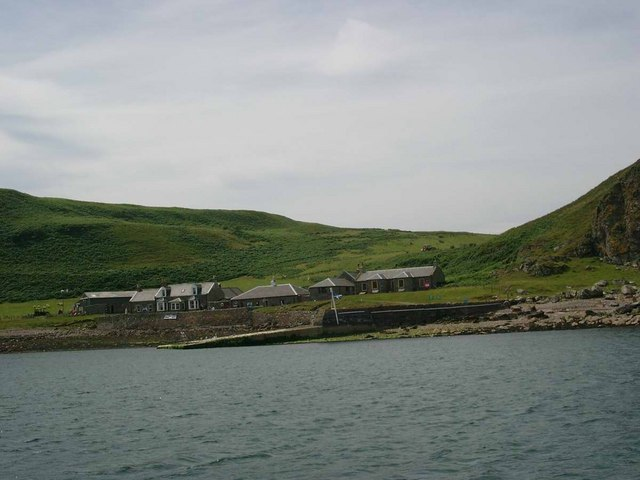
The Byron Darnton, allegedly the most remote pub in Scotland, named after a local shipwreck

At the southern tip of the island, there is a lighthouse built in 1850 by Alan Stevenson. When seen from the sea to the south, the natural arch, and the lighthouse on the rock can look like a ship, hence its name "The Ship" on marine charts.

=== Byron Darnton ===
A pub was opened in 2003, named Byron Darnton after the vessel which wrecked on the island in 1946. The Byron Darnton was named after an American war correspondent whose son, John Darnton, also became a journalist and wrote of his visit to the island in 2005.

== Stamps ==
Local stamps have been issued for Sanda since 1962. The stamps served the resident staff employed by the Northern Lighthouse Board, the owners and the many visitors to the island who wished to have their mail posted there, and carried to the nearest GPO post box on the mainland.
