= John Lesley =

Scottish Catholic bishop (1527–1596)

- Bishop of Ross
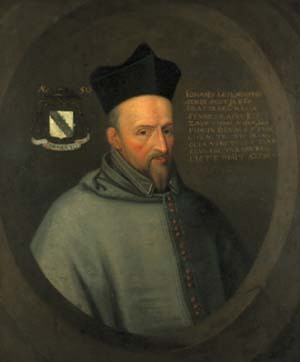
- Church: Roman Catholic Church
- Diocese: Ross
- In office: 1567–1592
- Predecessor: Henry Sinclair
- Successor: David Lindsay
- Previous posts: Archdeacon of Moray (1565–7); Commendator of Lindores (1566–8)

Orders
- Ordination: 1558
- Consecration: 1567

Personal details
- Born: 29 September 1527 Kingussie, Kingdom of Scotland
- Died: 31 May 1596 (aged 68) Grimbergen, Spanish Netherlands
- Education: University of Aberdeen

John Lesley (or Leslie) (29 September 1527 – 31 May 1596) was a Scottish Catholic bishop and historian. His father was Gavin Lesley, rector of Kingussie, Badenoch.

== Early career ==
He was educated at the King's College, University of Aberdeen, where he took the degree of M.A. In 1538 he obtained a dispensation permitting him to hold a benefice, notwithstanding his being a natural son of a cleric, and in June 1546 he was made an acolyte in the cathedral church of Aberdeen, of which he was afterwards appointed a canon and prebendary.

He also studied at Poitiers, at Toulouse and at Paris, where he was made doctor of laws in 1555. In 1558 he took orders and was appointed Official of Aberdeen, and inducted into the parsonage and prebend of Oyne. At the Reformation Lesley became a champion of Catholicism. He was present at the disputation held in Edinburgh in 1561, when Knox and Willox were his antagonists. He was one of the commissioners sent the same year to bring over the young Mary, Queen of Scots, to take the government of Scotland. He returned in her train, and was appointed a privy councilor and professor of canon law in King's College, Aberdeen, and in 1565 one of the senators of the college of justice. Shortly afterwards he was made abbot of Lindores, and in 1565 bishop of Ross, the election to the see being confirmed in the following year. He was present at Holyrood Palace during the murder of David Rizzio.

Lesley was one of the sixteen commissioners appointed to revise the laws of Scotland, and the volume of the Actis and Constitutiounis of the Realme of Scotland known as the Black Acts was, chiefly owing to his care, printed in 1566.

== Later career ==
John Lesley was one of the most steadfast friends of Queen Mary. After the failure of the royal cause, and while Mary was a captive in England, Lesley (who had gone to her at Bolton) continued to exert himself on her behalf. He was one of the commissioners at the conference at York in 1568. He appeared as her ambassador at the court of Elizabeth I to complain of the injustice done to her, and when he found he was not listened to he laid plans for her escape. He also projected a marriage for her with Thomas, Duke of Norfolk, which ended in the execution of that nobleman.

Elizabeth I had Lesley arrested in the autumn of 1569, partly to satisfy Regent Moray. He was put under the charge of Edwin Sandys, bishop of London. Lesley was questioned at Hampton Court and then sent to visit Mary, Queen of Scots, at Chatsworth and Sheffield. Lesley was again arrested at the discovery of the Ridolfi plot in May 1571 and sent to house arrest with Richard Cox, bishop of Ely. Lesley was held at Ely Place in Holborn, and then visited the bishop's houses at Fenstanton, and Somersham. Lesley was allowed five servants in Huntingdonshire and accompanied by Ninian Winzet. He was able ride and practice archery. As investigations into the activities of the Duke of Norfolk continued, Richard Cox sent Lesley's papers to London on 22 September. Lesley was brought back to London on 29 October 1571 to the house of the mayor Sir William Allen, and then imprisoned in the Tower of London.

During his confinement, Lesley collected materials for his history of Scotland, by which his name is now chiefly known. In 1571 he presented the latter portion of this work, written in Scots, to Queen Mary to amuse her in her captivity. He also wrote for her use his Piae Consolationes, and the queen devoted some of the hours of her captivity to translating a portion of it into French verse.

In 1573 he was liberated from prison, but was banished from England. For two years he attempted unsuccessfully to obtain the assistance of Continental princes in favor of Queen Mary. While at Rome in 1578 he published his Latin history De Origine, Moribus, et Rebus Gestis Scotorum. In October 1578 he had an audience with Rudolf II, Holy Roman Emperor, and their discussions included making a double portrait of Mary and James VI.

In 1579 he went to France and was made suffragan and vicar-general of the archbishopric of Rouen. While visiting his diocese, however, he was thrown into prison and had to pay 3000 pistoles to prevent his being given up to Elizabeth. During the remainder of the reign of Henry III he lived unmolested, but on the accession of the Protestant Henry IV he again fell into trouble. In 1590 he was thrown into prison, and had to purchase his freedom at the same expense as before. In 1593 he was made bishop of Coutances, Normandy, and had license to hold the bishopric of Ross until he should obtain peaceable possession of the former see. He retired to the Augustinian monastery of Grimbergen near Brussels, where he died on 31 May 1596.

The following year, his nephew and heir, also called John Lesley, dedicated an epitaph to commemorate the first anniversary of his death. The stone is still visible today, set in the north wall of the choir in the St Servatius basilica. Here is the text of the inscription and its translation:

D(eo) . O(ptimo) . M(aximo)
IOANNES.LESLOEVS.EPISCOPVS.ROSSENSIS
SCOTVS.EX.ILIVSTRI.FAMILIA.LESLOEORVM
OMNI.GENERE.SCIENTIARUM CVLTISSIM(us)
ORATOR.AD REGEM GALL(iae).FRANCISCVM II (= secundum)
CONSILIARIVS.MARIAE.G(?).M(?).SCOT(iae).REGINAE
CATHO(li)CAE.REL(igionis).CONSTANTISS(imus).PROPVGNATOR
POST IMMENSOS.PRO.AVITA.FIDE.LABORES
PROESERTIM.IN.REGNO.SCO(to).RESTITVENDO
POST.DEFENSAM.IN ANGLIA.MAR(iae).SCO(iae).REG(inae)
POST.VARIA.SVMMA.CVM.LAVDE.GESTA
TRANQVILLISSIME.EXCESSIT.BRVXELLAE.
PRID(ie):CAL(endas).IVN(ias).AN(n)O.M.V^{C}.XCVI (= 1596).
AETATIS.SVAE
LXX (= 70).
AVVNCVLO.GRATO.NE.SVPERESSET.INGRATVS
IOANNES.LESLOEVS.NEPOS.HOERES.MOEST(us).POS(uit)
ET.PRO.EODEM.ANNIVERSAR(io).P(?).P(?).FVNDAVIT
IN.HOC.COENOBIO.GRENBERGEN.PRIDIE.CAL(endas).IVN(ias)
CELEBRANDVM
NATALEM.ET.LOCVM.ET.DIEM.SCIMVS
SEPVLCHRI.NESCIMVS
1597

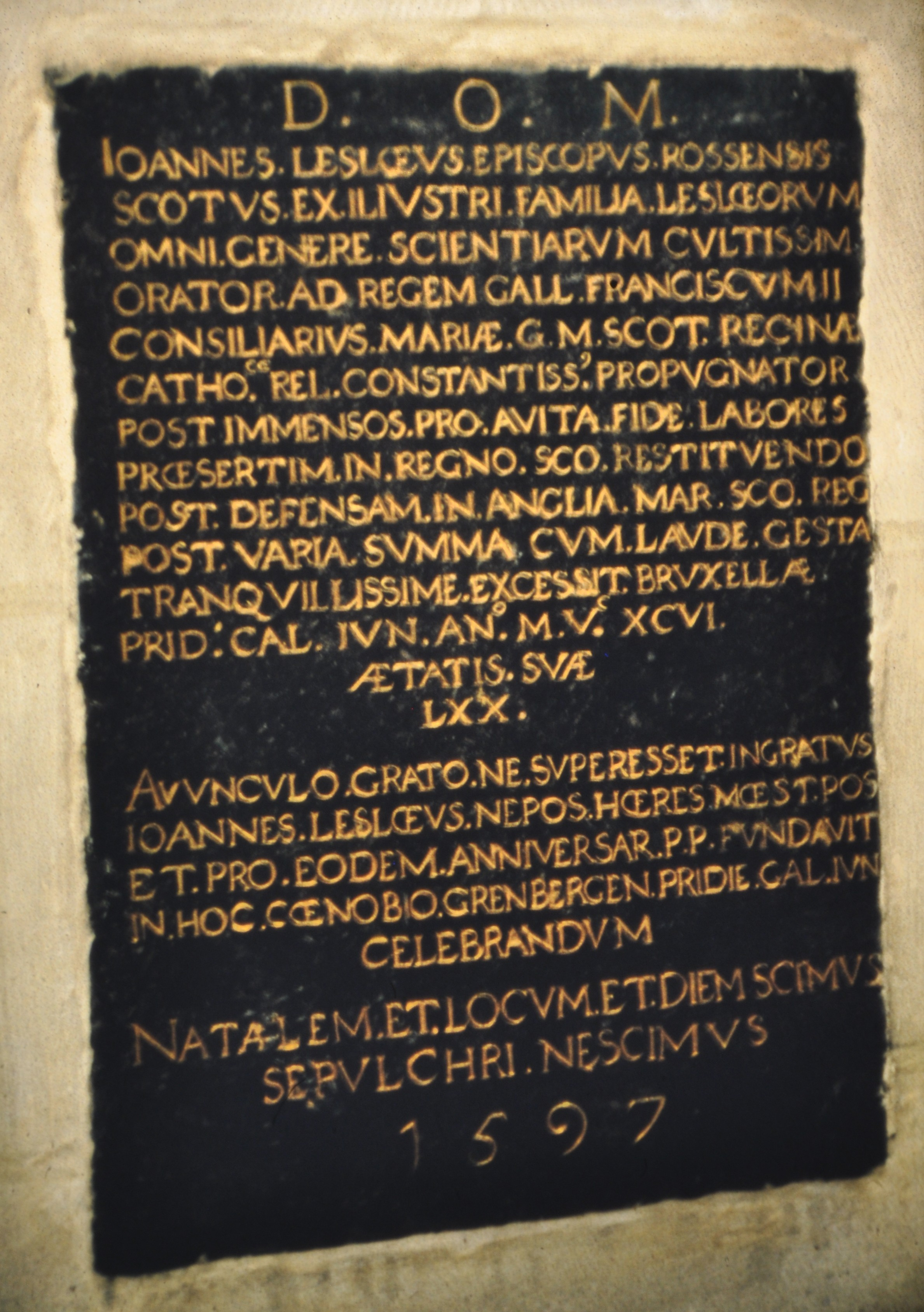
Epitaph of John Lesley, bishop of Ross. St Servatius basilica, Grimbergen (BE)

This inscription is dedicated to John Lesley, Bishop of Ross, a Scottish member of the Lesley family. He served as a speaker for King François II of France, a counselor to Mary, Queen of Scots, and a defender of the Catholic faith. After defending Mary, Queen of Scots, in England and returning to Scotland, he died in Brussels on May 31, 1596, at the age of 70.

Not to remain ungrateful to his dear uncle, John Lesley his nephew, his sad heir, had (this stone) installed and for the anniversary itself established ... in this monastery of Grenbergen on the eve of the calends of June for it to be celebrated.

We know the place and the day of our birth, but we ignore those of our grave.

1597"

== Works ==
The chief works of Lesley are as follows:

- A Defence of the Honor of Marie, Queene of Scotland, by Eusebius Dicaeophile, London, (1569)
  - reprinted, with alterations, at Liège (1571), under the title, A Treatise concerning the Defence of the Honour of Marie, Queene of Scotland, made by Morgan Philip pes, Bachelor of Divinitie, Piae afflicts animi consoleiones, ad Mariam Scot. Reg., Paris, (1574)
- De origine, moribus, ac rebus gestis Scotiae libri decem, Rome (1578). This History of Scotland in 10 books was presented to Mary Queen of Scots in 1571. The general title of Lesley's History of Scotland is: De origine, moribus, et rebus gestis Scotorum, Libri decerm. E quibus septem, veterum Scotorum res in primis memorabiles contractius reliqui vero tres posteriorum Regum ad nostra tempora historiam, quæ hucusque desiderabatur, fusius explicant; and the title prefixed to the second part is: De rebus gestis Scotorum posteriores libri tres, recentiorum regum historiam, quæ hucusque desiderabatur, ab anno Domini mccccxxxvi. usque ad annum mdlxii. fusius continentes. Nunc primum in lucem editi. It owes much, in its earlier chapters, to the accounts of Hector Boece and John Mair, though some portion of the topographical matter is first-hand. In later sections he gives an independent account, from a Catholic point of view, which is a valuable supplement and corrective in many details, to the works of George Buchanan and John Knox.
  - De origine moribus & rebus gestis Scotorum libri decem, Rome (1675), second Latin edition.
  - Cody, E. G., ed., History of Scotland, 2 vols., Scottish Text Society (1888, 1895). A Scots language translation of the published Latin made in 1596 by James Dalrymple of the Scottish Cloister at Regensburg.
  - Thomson, Thomas, ed., The history of Scotland, from the death of King James I. in the year M.CCCC.XXXVI to the year M.D.LXI, Bannatyne Club (1830) from a Scottish manuscript of De Origine
  - Lesley's Latin continuation of his history from 1562 to 1571, is translated in Forbes-Leith ed., Narrative of Scottish Catholics, (1885), from the original manuscript in the Vatican.
- De illustriun feminarum in repubtica administranda authoritate libellus, Reims, (1580). A Latin version of a tract on The Lawfulness of the Regiment of Women (cf. Knox's pamphlet)
- De titulo et jure Mariae Scot. Reg., quo regni Angliae successionem sibi juste vindicat, Reims (1580); published in translation in 1584.

== Editions ==
- Söllradl, B. (2020) De origine, moribus et rebus gestis Scotorum VIII. Lateinischer Text mit Einleitung, Übersetzung und Kommentar. Vienna: ÖAW.

== Notes ==
Religious titles
Preceded by Archibald Dunbar	Archdeacon of Moray; 1565–1567	Succeeded by Gavin Dunbar
Preceded by John Philp	Commendator of Lindores; 1566–1568	Succeeded by Patrick Leslie of Pitcairlie
Preceded by Henry Sinclair	Bishop of Ross; 1567–1592	Succeeded by David Lindsay
