= James Sandilands =

James Sandilands may refer to:

- James Sandilands, 1st Lord Torphichen (c. 1511–1596), Scottish nobleman
- James Sandilands, 1st Lord Abercrombie (before 1627 – after 1667), Scottish nobleman
- James Sandilands, 2nd Lord Abercrombie (1645–1681), Scottish nobleman
- James Sandilands, 7th Lord Torphichen (died 1753), Scottish nobleman and army officer
- James Walter Sandilands (1874–1959), British army officer
- James Sandilands (courtier) (died 1618), courtier to King James VI and I
