= James Turner (soldier) =

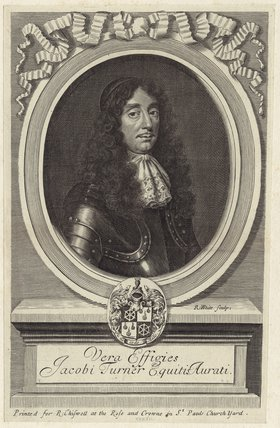
- Sir James Turner
- Born: 1615
- Died: After 1685
- Military career
- Allegiance: (Sweden) Swedish Empire (1632–1633); Brunswick-Lüneburg (1633–1639); Scottish Covenanters (1640–1650); Scottish Royalists (1650–1651); Denmark (1657) (Kingdom of Scotland) Scotland (1660–1684)
- Service years: 1632–1684
- Rank: Lieutenant colonel, Adjutant general
- Conflicts: Thirty Years' War; Wars of the Three Kingdoms: Battle of Oldendorf; Battle of Preston (1648); Battle of Dunaverty; Battle of Worcester
- Other work: Writer

Sir James Turner (1615 – after 1685) was a Scottish professional soldier of the 17th century.

== Life ==
=== Early life and foreign service ===
Turner was the eldest son of Patrick Turner (d.1634), minister of Dalkeith, and Margaret Law. He was educated at Glasgow University, graduating MA in 1631 (very much against his will, according to his later memoirs). His parents had intended for him to follow his father into the church, but Turner was determined to become a soldier, and in 1632 he travelled to Germany and enlisted in the service of Gustavus Adolphus, then embroiled in the Thirty Years' War, under the command of Sir James Lumsden.

=== With the Scottish army ===
By 1639 he had been promoted to captain, and returned to Scotland in search of employment, but soon departed again for Germany. In 1640 he attempted to travel to England to offer his services to Charles I in the Bishops' War, but failed to make contact with Charles's army. He instead entered service with the opposing Scottish Covenanting army at Newcastle, although he never signed the Covenant himself and appears to have remained more interested in joining the Royalist party; when in 1646 Charles was in the custody of the Scots army, Turner attempted to convince him of the necessity of escaping.

Under the overall command of David Leslie, Turner was dispatched to suppress the Royalist campaigning of the clansmen of Alasdair Mac Colla; despite the latter's fearsome reputation, Turner judged him to be "nae soljer", and criticised him for leaving garrisons behind without a source of water, leading to their rapid surrender. Turner was involved in Leslie's defeats of Mac Colla at the Battle of Rhunahaorine Moss and at Dunaverty. By 1647 he was made adjutant-general of the Scottish army. In August 1648, he accompanied the army of the Engagers to Preston, where it was routed by Oliver Cromwell, and he subsequently surrendered at Uttoxeter on 25 August. He was held prisoner until late 1649, when he returned to Germany.

=== Royalist service ===
Turner had hoped to join Montrose's 1650 Royalist campaign, but failed to get sufficient funds: in the event, Montrose was defeated at the Battle of Carbisdale. Later in 1650, Turner was able to cross to Scotland, landing the day before the Battle of Dunbar. Appointed adjutant-general of foot, he accompanied Charles II to the Battle of Worcester, was captured, subsequently escaped near Oxford, and walked to London before rejoining Charles on the continent. In 1654 he embarked on a risky mission to Fife to gauge the possibilities of a Royalist uprising, while in 1657 he went to Danzig to offer his services to John II Casimir, King of Poland under the Polish–Lithuanian Commonwealth, and then travelled to Denmark to fight in the ongoing conflict with Sweden.

Knighted at the Restoration, Turner was successively promoted in command of the Royal troops in Scotland, and employed in the suppression of the Lowland Covenanters popularly known as the "Killing Times". He adopted the tactic of the French dragonnades and quartered his troops in the houses of Presbyterian families: although he was given the nickname "Bloody Bite-the-Sheep" by Covenanters, and he added to an existing reputation for cruelty, it appears that he did not exceed his commission and did not go as far in enforcing Episcopacy as he was being urged by Archbishop James Sharp and others. While pro-Covenanter sources characterise Turner as mercilessly severe, commentators from the opposite camp observe that he would have witnessed atrocities committed by armed Covenanters (specifically at the Battle of Dunaverty) and would have therefore been disinclined to be lenient.

Despite his claims of not going beyond his commission, his actions provoked the Pentland Rising in 1666: surprised and captured at Dumfries, he was (according to some sources) repeatedly on the point of being put to death, but later escaped when some of his guards ran away, and he struck a deal (which was honoured) with the others to negotiate their surrender. In general he seems to have been treated well, his main complaint about his treatment being the interminably long graces he was compelled to listen to at mealtimes. When his captors, in a "merrie" humour asked him to attend a sermon, hoping to bring him over to their side, Turner joked with them (referring to the fines he used to levy on Covenanters) that "if I did not come to heare Mr Welch preach, then they might fine me in fortie shillings Scots, which was double the soume of what I had exacted from the phanatikes". Turner was blamed by the Scottish privy council for the Rising's outbreak, and was deprived of his commissions. For some fifteen years he then lived in retirement at Glasgow and his estate in Ayrshire, occupying himself with writing. In 1683-4 he was again involved in suppressing uprisings in south-west Scotland, but appears to have died soon after 1685, although the exact date of his death is unknown.

== Personal life ==
Turner was married to Mary White, whom he met in 1643 in Newry whilst campaigning in Ireland. He paid a warm tribute to her in his memoirs, noting that she was the granddaughter of a knight, and had been "tenacious of the Roman Catholic persuasion" when they met, a religion then "hatefull" to his masters in Scotland. Because of this and his own lack of money at the time he did not marry her until three years later in Hexham.

== Literary works ==
Turner is best known for his memoirs, first printed in 1819 long after his death. However, in his lifetime he published Pallas Armata, a set of essays on classical and modern warfare. He left a large number of manuscripts, catalogued as British Museum Add MS 12067 (now in the British Library), including philosophical essays, biographies, translations into English from Petrarch, and correspondence. He was also reputed to be the author of a satirical poem, Mitchell's Ghost, which accused John Graham of Claverhouse of infidelity with the wife of Lord Advocate George Mackenzie of Rosehaugh.

Turner's character appears to have embodied many contradictions, noticed even by his contemporaries or near contemporaries; whilst well-educated and intelligent, he had a reputation as a brutal and violent man even by the standards of the time. Defoe described him as a "butcher [...] rather than a soldier": Robert Wodrow characterised him as "bookish", while Gilbert Burnet (who knew him well in later life) said that "he was a learned man, but had been always in armies" and described him as "naturally fierce, but was mad when he was drunk, and that was very often". For his own part Turner noted that "I had swallowed without chewing in Germanie a very dangerous maxime which militarie men then too much followed, which was that so we serve our master honestlie it is no matter what master we serve".

== In fiction ==
Turner was to a large degree the inspiration for one of Sir Walter Scott's most well-known characters, the ex-mercenary Sir Dugald Dalgetty of Drumthwacket, in the novel A Legend of Montrose. Dalgetty's unintentionally humorous (over)use of Latin proverbs and quotes in particular has similarities to Turner's memoirs. His career may also have suggested some incidents incorporated by Scott in Old Mortality.
