= James Laird =

James Laird may refer to:

- James Laird (politician) (1849–1889), Nebraska Congress member
- James Laird (New Zealand politician) (1831–1902), eighth mayor of Whanganui, New Zealand (1886–1888)
- Jim Laird (1897–1970), James Laird, American football player
- James Austen Laird (1878–1950), Scottish architect
- Jim Laird (rugby league) (1904–?), New Zealand rugby player
