= John Leslie, Lord Newton =

Scottish landowner, judge and soldier

Sir John Leslie, Lord Newton of Birkhill and Newton (c.1595–1651) was a 17th-century Scottish landowner, judge, soldier and Senator of the College of Justice.

He was killed during the Siege of Dundee (1651) alongside his eldest son, whilst fighting for his cousin General Leslie against the English army under General Monck.

== Life ==
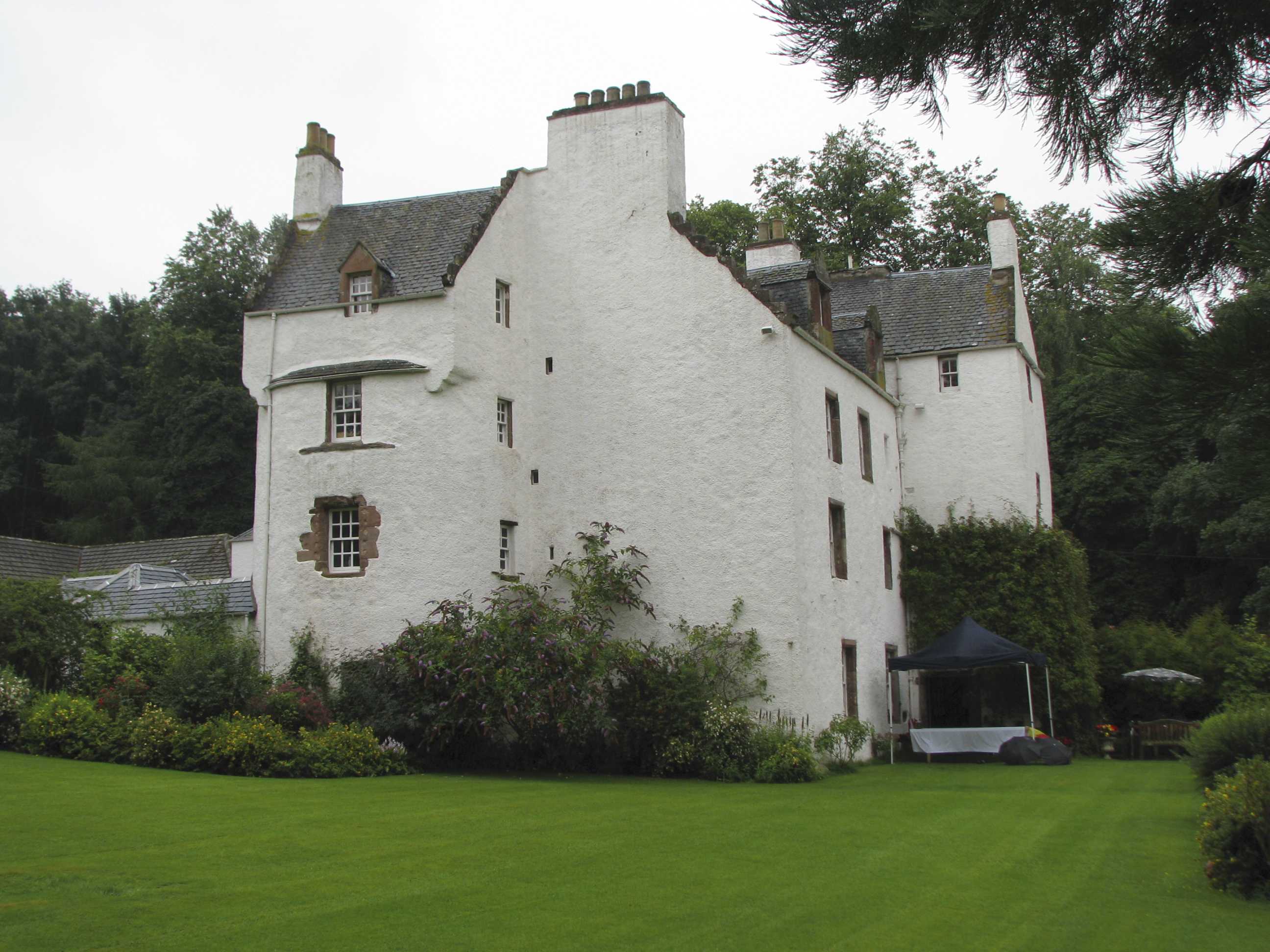
Newton Castle

He was the son of Andrew Leslie, 5th Earl of Rothes by his third wife, Janet Durie, and was born at Rothes Castle. John was half brother of Patrick Leslie, 1st Lord Lindores. He inherited Newton Castle near Blairgowrie, north of Dundee on the death of his elder brother George Leslie in 1614. The castle (more correctly a fortified house) was built around 1550 by his grandfather.

John trained as a lawyer and became an advocate around 1625, probably operating in Dundee. In November 1641 he was elected a Senator of the College of Justice in Edinburgh and took the title Lord Newton. In 1645 he was made a Commissioner of the Exchequer in Scotland.

Around 1646 he became a Lt Colonel in the King's Horse Guards, fighting in the Royalist army against Cromwell. This position placed him at the head of the cavalry under his cousin General David Leslie. Their similar names causes a slight confusion. In 1648 he assisted in the "rescue" of King Charles I of England from Carisbrooke Castle.

He was deprived of office in the College of Justice in 1649 due to the Act of Classes which stipulated which professions could be a judge. He thereafter concentrated on soldiering, which was a necessary task during the then Civil War. He was probably at the Battle of Dunbar (1650).

He was killed on 1 September 1651 fighting alongside his son (who was also killed) defending the city of Dundee against the English army in the closing months of the English Civil War. The lowest estimates of deaths on the side of Dundee is around 500. This was the final battle of the Civil War. Due to the circumstances of his death he is thought to be buried in a mass grave in Dundee.

== Family ==
He was married to Elizabeth Gray, daughter of Patrick Gray, 6th Lord Gray.

His eldest son John Leslie was killed alongside him in the Siege of Dundee (1651). His second son Andrew Leslie (d.1669) became later known as Andrew Leslie of Quarter (in Burntisland).
