= Christian Fletcher =

Scottish noblewoman who saved the Honours of Scotland

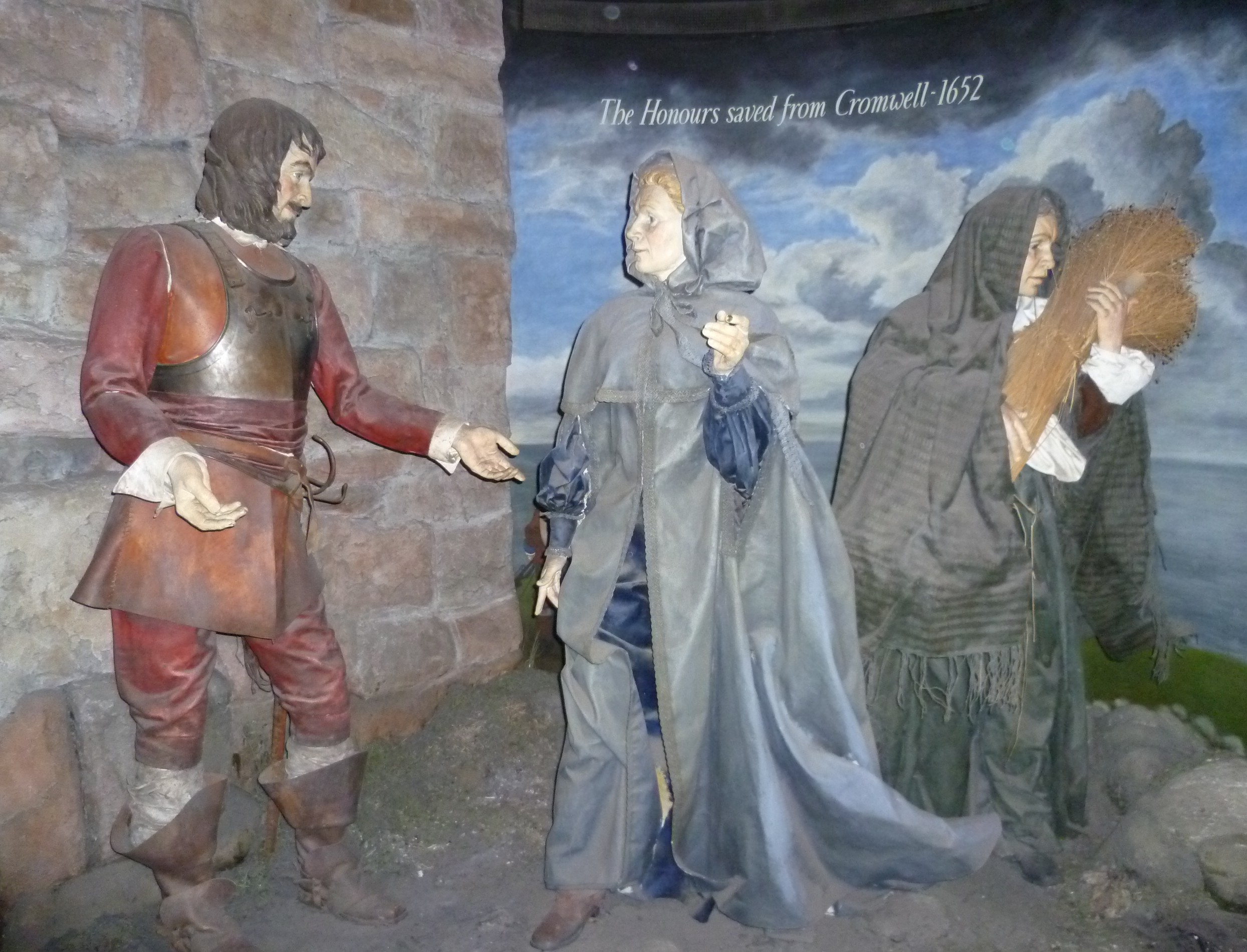
- Christian Fletcher (centre) saving the Honours of Scotland
- Born: 1619 or 1620; Kinneff, Kincardineshire, Scotland
- Died: February 1691
- Known for: Helping save the Honours of Scotland from Cromwell's troops

Christian Fletcher, Lady Abercrombie (1619 or 1620 – February 1691), was a Scottish minister's wife who helped save the Honours of Scotland from Cromwell's troops during the English invasion of Scotland. She was married from 1642 to James Granger (or Grainger), the Presbyterian minister of Kinneff Church.

In 1651, the Honours were kept at Dunnottar Castle, but they had to be removed as the castle was about to be surrendered to the English. The different parts were delivered on three occasions to the care of Fletcher, who buried them in Kinneff church. There are different versions of exactly how they were smuggled out of the castle and taken to Kinneff.

In 1661, Parliament awarded Fletcher 2,000 merks in recognition of her service. She married James Sandilands, 1st Lord Abercrombie, in 1663.

== See also ==
- Charles II's coronation at Scone Abbey on 1 January 1651
