= James Sandilands, 1st Lord Abercrombie =

Scottish nobleman (bef. 1627 – aft. 1667)

James Sandilands, 1st Lord Abercrombie (bef. 1627 – aft. 1667) was a Scottish aristocrat.

== Biography ==
Sandilands was the son of Sir James Sandilands and Agnes Carnegie, second daughter of David Carnegie, 1st Earl of Southesk.

He married Jean Lichtoun about 1643 and had two children:

- James Sandilands, 2nd Lord Abercrombie (1645–1681)
- Anna Sandilands

A spendthrift, Sandilands ran into debt after his father's death in 1644. He was created Lord Abercrombie on 12 December 1647, but, in 1649, he was forced to dispose of his property to settle his debts. The castle of Newark or St Monans and his other properties in Fife were sold to David Leslie, the Covenanter general.

He lived abroad on the continent from 1650 to 1658. He divorced his wife on 13 March 1663 and, late that year, married Christian Fletcher. She has been identified as one of those who hid the Scottish regalia before the fall of Dunnottar Castle.

Abercrombie died sometime after February 1667.

== Bibliography ==
- thePeerage.com
- Castle of St Monace

Peerage of Scotland
New creation	Lord Abercrombie; 1647 – aft. 1667	Succeeded by James Sandilands
