= Lord Abercrombie =

Lord of Abercrombie was a title in the Peerage of Scotland that was created on 12 December 1647. It became extinct on the death of the 2nd Lord in 1681.

== Lords of Abercrombie (1647) ==
- James Sandilands, 1st Lord Abercrombie (d. after 1658)
- James Sandilands, 2nd Lord Abercrombie (d. 1681)

== See also ==
- Baron Abercromby
