= Keil Hotel =

Former hotel in Scotland

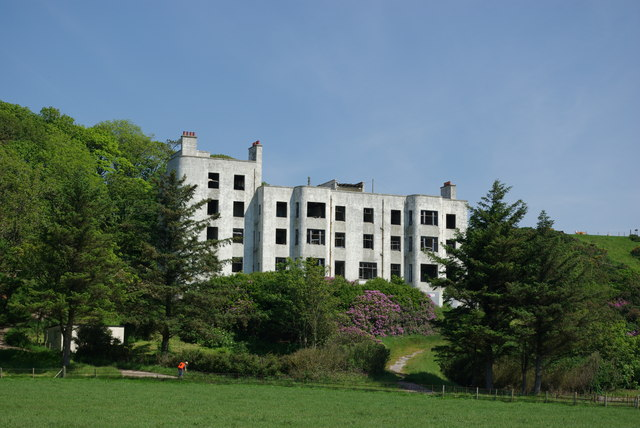
- Keil Hotel
- Interactive map of the Keil Hotel area

General information
- Architectural style: Modern Movement architecture
- Location: Southend, Kintyre, Scotland
- Coordinates: 55°18′40″N 5°39′33″W
- Groundbreaking: 1937
- Completed: 1939
- Opened: 1947
- Closed: 1990
- Client: Captain James Taylor J.P.

Design and construction
- Architect: James Austen Laird

Keil Hotel is a former hotel near Southend, Kintyre in western Scotland.

== History and architecture ==
It was constructed between 1937 and 1939 for Captain James Taylor J.P. (a retired farmer) and built to the designs of architect James Austen Laird. It was one of the last buildings designed by Laird before he closed his practice in 1940. and shows the influence of the modern movement.

During the Second World War it was used as a naval hospital by the British Admiralty, but in 1947, Captain Taylor opened it to the public as a hotel. In 1949 the Keil Hotel Company Ltd was formed by James Taylor and Sibella H. Taylor with a capital of £10,000 (equivalent to £310,000 in 2025) to operate the business.

In 1990 the hotel closed. Despite plans for conversion into apartments, and later plans for a hotel and country club, the building deteriorated. Within 20 years some of the upper floors had collapsed, and it ended up on the Buildings at Risk Register for Scotland.
