= Abbot of Lindores =

Head of Lindores Abbey in Fife, Scotland

The Abbot of Lindores (later Commendator of Lindores) was the head of the Tironensian monastic community and lands of Lindores Abbey in Fife (the nearby town of Newburgh was created by and belonged to the abbey). The position was created when the abbey was founded some time between 1190 and 1191 by King William the Lion's brother Prince David, Earl of Huntingdon, and Lord of Garioch. The following is a list of abbots and commendators.

== List of abbots ==
- Guy, 1191-1219
- John, 1219-1244
- Thomas, 1259-1273
- John, 1273-1274
- Nicholas, 1274-1282
- John, 1287-1291
- Thomas, 1296
- Andrew de Lenna, x 1306
- William, 1306x1307
- Adam, 1331-1344x1346
- William, 1358-1363
- Roger, 1370-1380
- John Steele, 1380 x 1381-1383 x 1390
- William de Angus, 1380-1395
- John Steele (again), fl. 1402-1421
- James de Rossy, 1425-1451
- John Ramsay, 1457-1474
- Andrew Cavers, 1475-1502
- Henry Orme, 1502-1528
- John Philp, 1523-1566

== List of commendators ==
- John Lesley, 1566-1568
- Patrick Leslie of Pitcairlie, 1st Lord Lindores, 1569-1600

== Bibliography ==
- Watt, D.E.R., Fasti Ecclesiae Scotinanae Medii Aevi ad annum 1638, 2nd Draft, (St Andrews, 1969), p. 69-70
- Watt, D.E.R. & Shead, N.F. (eds.), The Heads of Religious Houses in Scotland from the 12th to the 16th Centuries, The Scottish Records Society, New Series, Volume 24, (Edinburgh, 2001), p. 136-39

== See also ==
- Lindores Abbey
