= James Austen Laird =

Scottish architect

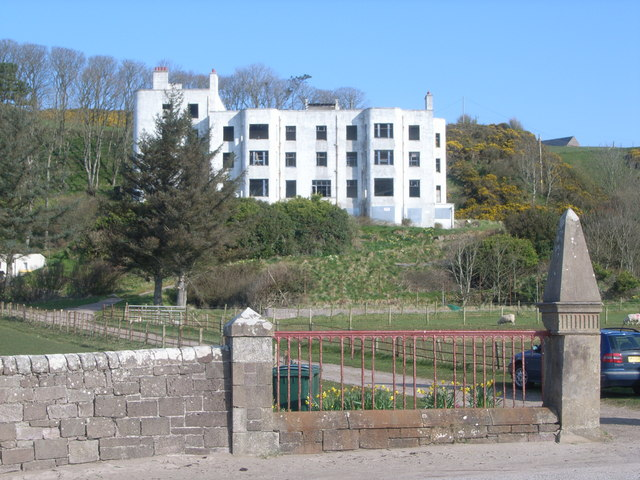
Keil Hotel 1937–39

James Austen Laird LRIBA (22 September 1878 – 14 February 1950) was an architect based in Glasgow.

== Background ==
He was born in Glasgow, the son of John Laird (1850-1947) and Martha Barr (1851-1933) on 7 September 1904 he married Agnes Risk Thomson (1881 - 1914) and they had four children:

- John McClelland Laird (1905–1988)
- Mary Risk Laird (1907–1961)
- Muriel Martha Barr Laird (1909–1990)
- Agnes Austen Laird (1912–2007)

In 1919 he married Janet Hamilton (Nettie) Thomson (1877–1944), older sister of his deceased wife. He died on 14 February 1950 in Croydon and left an estate valued at £35,486 (equivalent to £1,535,800 in 2023).

== Career ==
He was articled to Macwhannell & Rogerson from 1894 to 1898 and then acted as assistant to John James Burnet from 1899 to 1901. He started independent practice in 1901 and worked in partnership with J.W. Laird and James Napier.

He was awarded a Licentiate of the Royal Institute of British Architects in 1911.

He is best known for Carlung House at West Kilbridge, which he designed for his uncle Robert Barr, Balmore School in Possilpark, and the Keil Hotel, Southend, Kintyre

== Works ==
- Empress Cinema, 557 Govan Street, Gorbals, Glasgow 1912
- Greystones, Houston Road, Kilmacolm 1913
- Balmore Public (now Greenview) School, 165 Glenhead Street, Glasgow 1929
- Carlung House, West Kilbride, Ayrshire 1930
- Keil Hotel, Southend, Kintyre 1937 – 1939
