= St Columba's Chapel, Southend =

Ruined medieval chapel in Argyll and Bute, Scotland

Coordinates: 55.3084°N 5.6675°W

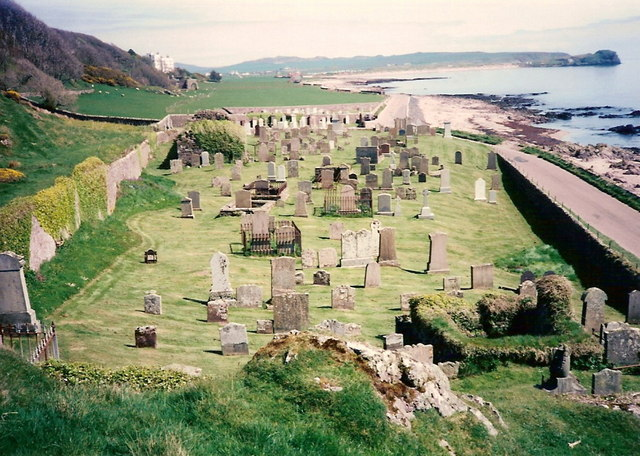
View of St Columba's Church, Southend

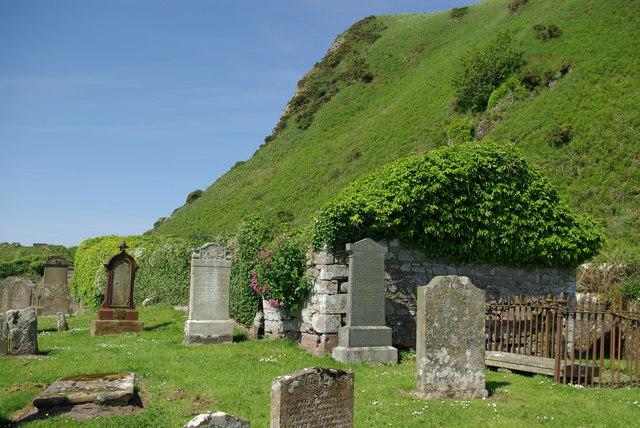
St Columba's Church, Southend

St Columba's Chapel (Kilcomkill) is a ruined medieval chapel near Southend, Argyll and Bute, Scotland. It is noted for its carved grave slabs.
