= Sheep Island, Argyll =

Island in Argyll and Bute, Scotland

Coordinates: 55.29128°N 5.57209°W

Sheep Island
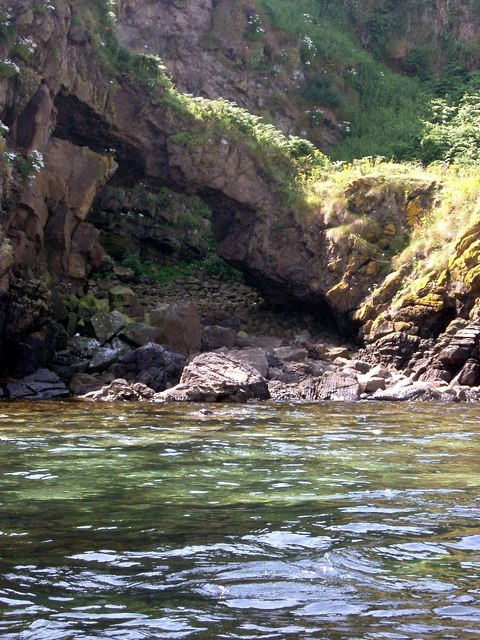
- A natural arch on Sheep Island

Location
- Sheep Island shown within Argyll and Bute
- OS grid reference: NR7328305574

Administration
- Council area: Argyll and Bute
- Country: Scotland
- Sovereign state: United Kingdom

Demographics
- Population: 0

Sheep Island is a small uninhabited island situated off the southern tip of the Kintyre peninsula in Scotland.

Sheep Island, along with Sanda Island and Glunimore Island, form a small group of islands approximately three kilometres (two miles) south of Kintyre at grid reference NR733055.

Running roughly north to south, the island is around 600 metres (650 yards) long, and is steep and precipitous along the west coast, rising to a maximum height of 41 metres (135 feet). There is a cave on the west coast and a natural arch at the northwest of the island. A considerable reef of drying rocks surrounds the island and makes landing on the island problematic. There are a number of strong tidal races in the area, Tum ba nach is one that extends north from Sheep Island to around halfway across the Sound of Sanda.

As the name suggests, sheep have traditionally been grazed here, however the island is more notable as the primary breeding ground for puffins in the Clyde. From here the birds are returning to nearby Ailsa Craig, where they were once wiped out. Guillemots and razorbills also nest on Sheep Island.
