= James Sandilands, 2nd Lord Abercrombie =

Scottish politician (1645–1681)

James Sandilands, 2nd Lord Abercrombie (1645–1681), a member of the Parliament of Scotland, was the son of James Sandilands, 1st Lord Abercrombie and Jean Lichtoun.

His father's wasteful spending had resulted in the alienation of the family lands in Fife in 1649, and Abercrombie seems to have spent most of his life in poverty.

He died unmarried in 1681 in Kinneff and the lordship of parliament became extinct.

Peerage of Scotland
Preceded by James Sandilands	Lord Abercrombie aft. 1667–1681	Extinct
