= John Nevay =

Scottish Covenanter (??–1672)

John Nevay (died 1672) was a Scottish Covenanter. He was the nephew of Andrew Cant, minister of Aberdeen. He graduated with an M.A. from King's College, Aberdeen, in 1626. He worked as tutor to George, Master of Ramsay. He was licensed by the Presbytery of Dalkeith 14 October 1630 on the recommendation of that of Alford, but left its bounds a fortnight after. He was admitted about 1637 and appointed in 1647 a member of committee to revise the Psalter. He was present at Mauchline Moor in opposition to the royal army in June 1648. He was subsequently pardoned by Parliament on 16 January 1649. Nevay was appointed a commissioner by Parliament for visiting the University of Aberdeen 31 July 1649. He was active in raising the western army in 1650, and in 1651 a prominent supporter of the Protesters. In 1654 he was named by the Council of England on a committee for authorising admissions to the ministry in the province of Glasgow and Ayr. On 23 December 1662 he was banished by the Privy Council from His Majesty's dominions and went to Holland, where he died in 1672, aged about 66.

== Personal life ==
He was a man of great zeal though somewhat violent and did not object to the execution of the Macdonald prisoners taken at Dunaverty. He married Ann Sharp, widow of Robert Halyburton, merchant, Edinburgh; she survived him, and had issue — a son.

== Life ==
A nephew of Andrew Cant, Nevay entered King's College, Aberdeen in 1622, and graduated M.A. in 1626. For some time he was tutor to the Master of Ramsay; and on the recommendation of the presbytery of Alford he was licensed as a preacher of the kirk of Scotland by the presbytery of Dalkeith on 14 October 1630. In 1637 he was admitted minister of Newmilns in Ayrshire, and he was chosen a member of the general assemblies of 1646, 1647, and 1649.

Nevay was opposed to all forms of set prayer in public worship, objecting to the use of the Lord's Prayer, the Gloria Patri, and the repeating of the creed at baptism. In the assembly of 1647 he was appointed to revise Francis Rous's version of the last thirty psalms, with a view to the adoption of the collection by the assembly.

Nevay joined the Whigamores at Mauchline in June 1648. His conduct, with that of others who took part in the raid, was absolved by an act of parliament passed in the following January. In July 1649 he was named one of the commissioners for visiting the university of Aberdeen. In 1650 he took an active part in raising the western army, composed of Covenanters. On the division of the church in 1651 into two parties, the "resolutioners" and the "protesters", Nevay sided with the protesters, who abjured Charles II, and claimed for the spiritual power an extensive jurisdiction over civil matters. In 1654 he was named by the English Council of State one of those for authorising admissions to the ministry in the province of Glasgow and Ayr.

After the Restoration of 1660, Nevay was on 11 December 1661 banished by the privy council from Charles II's dominions, and went to Holland. On 20 July a demand by the English government for his expulsion, along with Robert Macuard and Robert Traill, was laid before the states of Holland, and on 23 September placards were issued, stating that they were sentenced to leave the Dutch territory within fifteen days under pain of being prosecuted as "stubborn rebels".

Nevay died in Holland about January 1672.

== Works ==
- The Nature, Properties, Blessings, and Saving Graces of the Covenant of Grace (Glasgow, 1748)
- Latin Stanzas on Isaiah ii. 1-5 (Vuftien Predicatien, door Jac. Borstius (Utrecht, 1696)

Nevay was the author of:

- The Nature, Properties, Blessings, and Saving Graces of the Covenant of Grace, published at Glasgow in 1748, and of
- two copies of Latin stanzas—one on Isaiah ii. 1–8—prefixed to the sermons of Jacobus Borstius (Veertien Predicatien door Jac. Borstius, Utrecht, 1696).

He is also said to have written a Latin version of the Song of Solomon and Christ's Temptation (Robert Wodrow, Analecta, i. 170).

== Bibliography ==
- Letters of Samuel Rutherford
- Robert Baillie's Letters and Journal
- Nicolls's Diary, both in the Bannatyne Club
- Diary of the Lairds of Brodie
- Fasti Aberd., both in the Spalding Club
- Wodrow's Analecta
- Wodrow's Sufferings of the Kirk of Scotland
- Stevens's Hist. of the Scottish Church in Rotterdam
- Burton's Scot Abroad
- Hew Scott's Fasti Eccles. Scot. ii. 184.
- Rutherfurd's and Baillie's Letts.
- Wodrow's Hist., 317, 318
- Acts of Ass.
- Acts of Pari., vi., vii.
- Nicoll's and Brodie's Diaries
- Steven's Scott. Church, Rotterdam, 36, 51, 54, 75
- Reg. of Deeds, Mack., viii., 345
- Dict. Nat. Biog.
- Highland Papers, ii. (Scott. Hist. Socy.)
- Lang's Hist, of Scotland, iii., 181, 247
- Mathieson's Politics and Religion, ii., 71.
