= Glunimore Island =

Island in Argyll and Bute, Scotland

Coordinates: 55.28716°N 5.55912°W

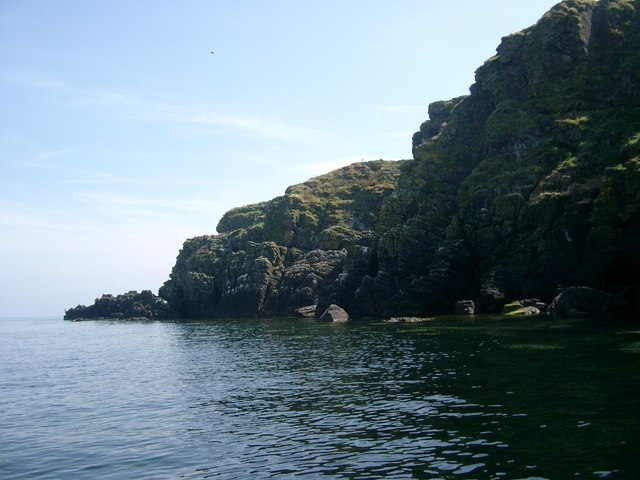

Location
- Glunimore Island shown within Argyll and Bute
- OS grid reference: NR7419905020

Administration
- Council area: Argyll and Bute
- Country: Scotland
- Sovereign state: United Kingdom

Demographics
- Population: 0

Glunimore Island is an uninhabited island around 3 miles (5 kilometres) southeast of the Kintyre peninsula, Scotland. It lies alongside Sanda Island and Sheep Island

The island is just 200 metres (660 ft) long and rises to a height of 27 metres (89 ft). There is a cave on the shoreline at the north. A drying reef surrounds the island to the north and east. More of these dangerous reefs litter the sound between Glunimore, Sanda and Sheep Island. Paterson's Rock is yet another dangerous rock around 1.5 kilometres (a mile) to the east. Despite these obstacles the natural harbour formed by the three islands is still often used by boats rounding the Mull of Kintyre.

Glunimore and neighbouring Sheep Island are the most important breeding grounds of puffins in the Clyde and the birds are now returning from here to Ailsa Craig another traditional breeding ground. Guillemots and razorbills also nest here.

The island was visited in 1899 by two naturalists performing a survey for the Natural History Society of Glasgow.

Glunimore Island lends its name to a cottage on neighbouring Sanda Island and to a house in Campbeltown.
