= Southend, Argyll =

Coordinates: 55.315°N 5.641°W

Southend: Scottish Gaelic: Ceann mu Dheas (historically Ceann Siar); Scots: Suthen
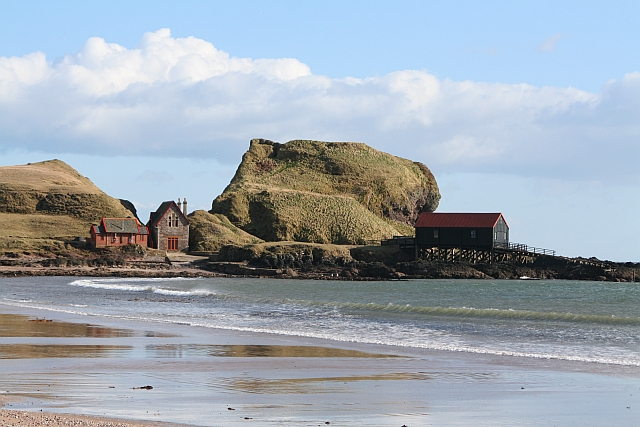
- Dunaverty Rock from Dunaverty Bay

- Location within Argyll and Bute
- Population: 497 (2001)
- OS grid reference: NR6908
- Civil parish: Southend
- Council area: Argyll and Bute
- Lieutenancy area: Argyll and Bute
- Country: Scotland
- Sovereign state: United Kingdom
- Post town: CAMPBELTOWN
- Postcode district: PA28
- Dialling code: 01586
- Police: Scotland
- Fire: Scottish
- Ambulance: Scottish
- UK Parliament: Argyll, Bute and South Lochaber
- Scottish Parliament: Argyll and Bute

Southend (Scottish Gaelic: Ceann mu Dheas, pronounced [ˈkʲʰaun̪ˠ mə ˈʝes̪]) is the main settlement at the southern end of the Kintyre peninsula in Argyll and Bute, Scotland. It lies 8 miles (13 km) south of Campbeltown, the main town in the area. The civil parish of Southend comprises the village and the surrounding land, used mainly for farming and forestry. The population of the parish is 497.

== History ==
The village is located beside Dunaverty Bay, which at one end has a rocky promontory called Dunaverty Rock, where Dunaverty Castle was located. Historically the local inhabitants may be first mentioned by Ptolemy as the Epidii (horse people), whose main town may have been named later in the Ravenna Cosmography as Rauatonium. During the early medieval period Dunaverty became the location where Saint Columba first set foot in Scotland. Above the cemetery at Keil are two carved human footprints (Petrosomatoglyphs) similar to that seen at Dunadd, now called Columba's Footprints. Here it is claimed Columba first preached on Scottish soil, after being banished from Ireland.

The Annals of Ulster report a siege in 712 by king Sealbach of Dalriada, confirming the importance of Dunaverty Rock as a fortified centre of power. Robert the Bruce sheltered at the castle, which changed hands many times in the later medieval period. During the Dunaverty Massacre of 1647 the Catholic MacDonalds were burned alive in their stronghold at Dunaverty Castle.

== Modern Southend ==
John Campbell, 5th Duke of Argyll developed the village as "Newton Argyll" in the late 18th century.

Within Southend parish there are St Blaan's church, Southend primary school, a GP's surgery, Dunaverty Hall (the new village hall with a football pitch and children's swing park), Dunaverty Golf Club's well-maintained and affordable 18-hole links course, Machribeg caravan park and camp-site, the Argyll Arms Hotel, the listed Art Deco Keil Hotel, the historic ruin of Keil School, Keil caves, and the Muneroy shop and tea-room. The main employment sources are farming, forestry and tourism-related business.

The big attraction for tourists is the Mull of Kintyre, a high dramatic headland that is the closest point on Britain to Ireland. The Mull affords tremendous views and sunsets to the west including Ireland, Rathlin and Islay, and looks like a small piece of the Highlands. The road down from the top to the west-facing lighthouse is closed to most vehicles, but is walkable for the fit and determined. Several aircraft have crashed on the Mull, and there is a memorial to those lost in a Chinook helicopter crash in 1994 close to the road down to the lighthouse.

The beaches along the south coast of Kintyre are sandy, offering good walks in their own right or as part of the Kintyre Way, and good light for artists and photographers. The beaches are named for the farms (some of which offer caravans) including Gartvaigh, Brunerican, Penyseorach, Kilmashenachan, Macharioch and Polliwilline. The Antrim coast is 12 miles away and visible in clear weather. Sanda Island lies two miles south-east of Southend, and can be seen on wildlife boat trips from Campbeltown harbour in summer.

== Lifeboat station ==
The Royal National Lifeboat Institution (RNLI) operated a lifeboat station at Southend from 1869 until 1930, the boathouse and slipway being at Dunaverty Bay. The lifeboat, station and a house for the coxswain were paid for by the Ker family of Auchinraith in memory of John Ronald Ker who drowned nearby in 1867. The lifeboat was first launched on 21 June 1869 and was managed by the same committee as Campbeltown Lifeboat Station which had opened in 1861. The boathouse was rebuilt in 1905 and a 130 ft (40 m) slipway built in 1905 to enable the boat to be launched more easily in bad weather.

During the 61 years of operation it was home to three different lifeboats:

In service	ON	Name	Class
1869–1888	–	John R. Ker	Self-Righter
1888–1904	160	John R. Ker	Self-Righter
1904–1930	529	John R. Ker	Watson

== Notable residents ==
- Angus MacVicar, author, whose works detail rural life and history in the village and surrounding area.
