= Lord Lindores =

Lordship of Parliament in the Peerage of Scotland

The title of Lord Lindores was a Lordship of Parliament in the Peerage of Scotland. It was created on 31 March 1600 for Patrick Leslie. Since the death of the eighth lord in 1813, the lordship has remained unclaimed, i.e. it has been dormant since.

== Lord Lindores (1600) ==
- Patrick Leslie, 1st Lord Lindores (d. 1608)
- Patrick Leslie, 2nd Lord Lindores (d. 1649)
- James Leslie, 3rd Lord Lindores (d. c.1666)
- John Leslie, 4th Lord Lindores (d. 1706)
- David Leslie, 5th Lord Lindores (d. 1719)
- Alexander Leslie, 6th Lord Lindores (d. 1765)
- James Francis Leslie, 7th Lord Lindores (d. 1775)
- John Leslie, 8th Lord Lindores (1750–1813) (dormant & unclaimed)
