= Kinneff =

Hamlet in Aberdeenshire, Scotland

Coordinates: 56.86474°N 2.23847°W

- Hamlet
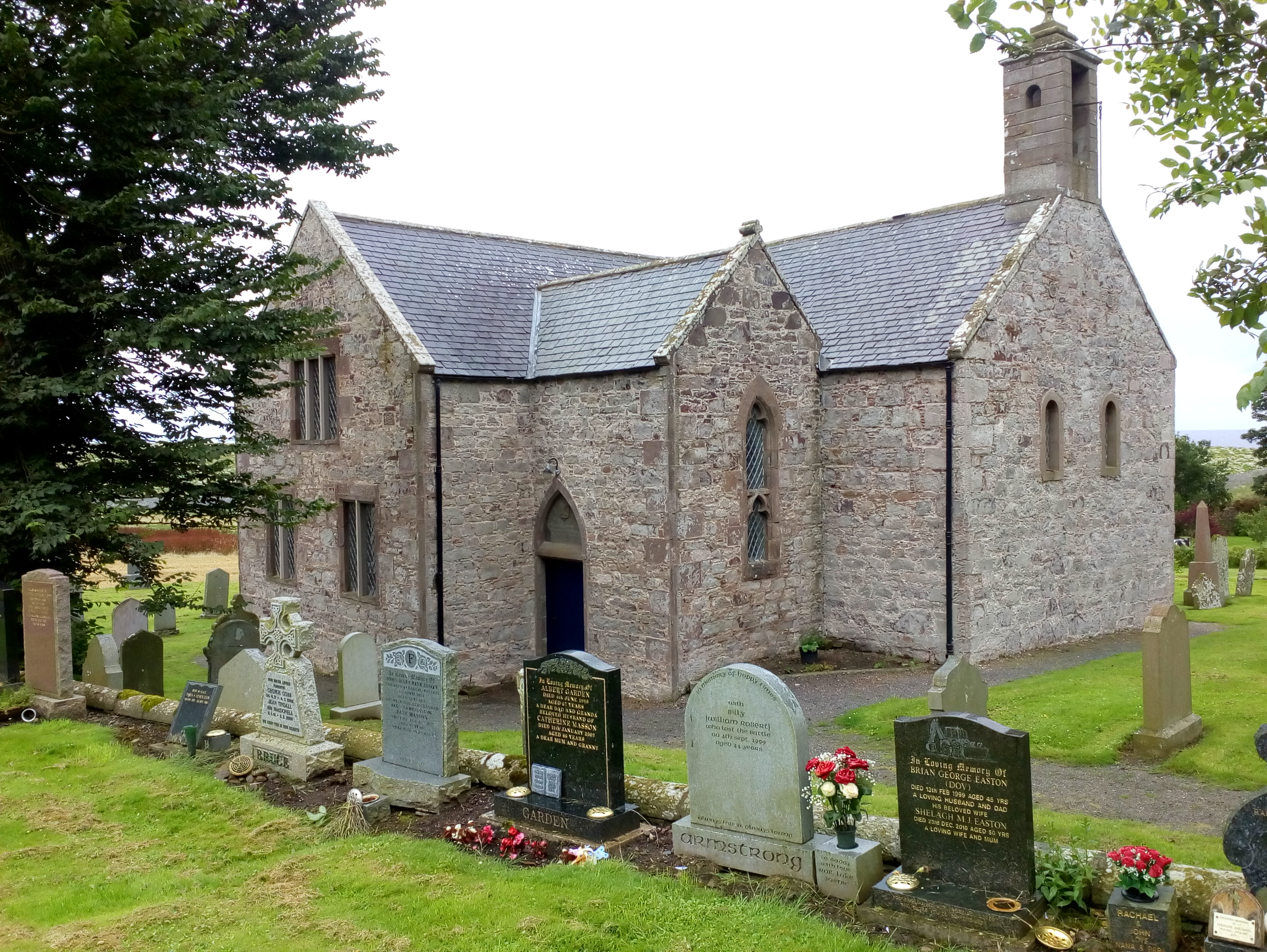
- Kinneff Old Kirk in 2017

- Location within Aberdeenshire
- OS grid reference: NO 844 766
- Council area: Aberdeenshire
- Lieutenancy area: Kincardineshire
- Country: Scotland
- Sovereign state: United Kingdom
- Post town: MONTROSE
- Postcode district: DD10
- Police: Scotland
- Fire: Scottish
- Ambulance: Scottish
- UK Parliament: West Aberdeenshire and Kincardine
- Scottish Parliament: Angus North and Mearns

Kinneff is a roadside hamlet in Aberdeenshire, Scotland, just to the north of Inverbervie. To the north lies another hamlet, Catterline.

== History ==
Within the hamlet lies Kinneff Old Kirk, which is notable as the site where the Honours of Scotland were hidden by Christian Fletcher after the Siege of Dunnottar Castle in 1651 until the Restoration in 1660. The church was rebuilt in 1738 (and repaired in 1784 and 1831, with some additions in 1876), but some of the fabric of the building incorporates considerable portions of an earlier building. It was dedicated to St Arnty or Arnold, probably corruptions of Adamnan, in 1242. It belonged to the Priory of St Andrews.

A separate Kinneff Church was opened by the Free Church of Scotland, after the schism in 1843, located to the west at Roadside of Kinneff, bordering what is now the A92. It reverted to the Church of Scotland in the subsequent unions of denominations to become part of the Church of Scotland via the United Free Church.

In 1967, the parishes of Arbuthnott and Kinneff were linked. In 1990, this was revised with Kinneff being linked to Stonehaven South Church. In November 2007, Kinneff Parish was united with Arbuthnott and Bervie to form Arbuthnott, Bervie and Kinneff Church.

The original Kinneff Old Church was closed as an active place of worship in 1976, with the congregation merged with the newer Kinneff Church. The church is now open to the public, and run by a team of volunteers. The newer Kinneff Church closed for worship on Sunday 13th June 2010, and has subsequently been sold and developed into a private house in 2015.

== Facilities ==
In August 2024, Kinneff Primary School was mothballed by Aberdeenshire Council due to the very small roll for a number of years. Children from the Kinneff area now attend either Bervie or Catterline Primary Schools.

The community has a village hall, a couple of bus stops on each side of the village on the A92, and a small swing park.

== Notable residents ==
- Rev Joseph Robert Fraser (d.1933), minister of the United Free Church in Kinneff, was a Fellow of the Royal Society of Edinburgh.

== Local radio ==
Alongside the commercial enterprise of the local newspaper, The Mearns Leader, Kinneff has a local community radio station in Mearns FM. Broadcasting from nearby Stonehaven in the town hall, Mearns FM aims to keep Kinneff up to date by publicising local and charity events, as well as playing music. Staffed completely by volunteers, Mearns FM is run as a not-for-profit organisation, broadcasting under a Community Radio Licence, with a remit to provide local focus news events and programming. The station is jointly funded by local adverts and local and national grants. Mearns FM has one of the largest listening areas of any Community Radio Station owing to the Mearns' distributed population. Mearns FM was set up to try to bring these distant communities together.

== Transportation ==
Kinneff is served by buses, including the 107, the X7 Coastrider and a new route (since 2026) in the North East by Ember. The A92 runs through the hamlet in a north/south direction.

== See also ==
- Bervie Water
- Allardice Castle
- Christian Fletcher
