= Lindores Abbey =

Abbey in Fife, Scotland

Coordinates: 56.35274°N 3.22816°W

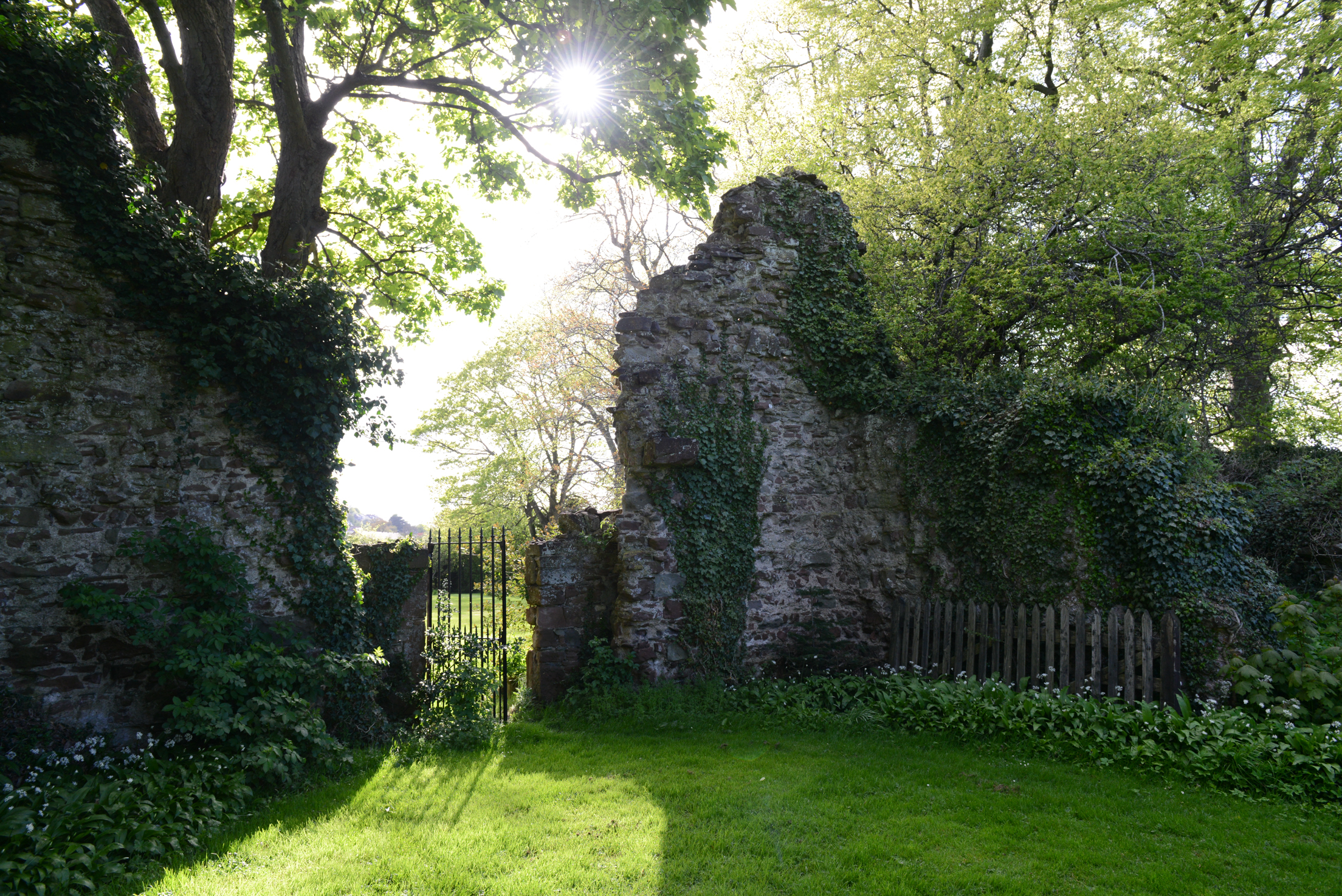
- Abbey ruins
- Interactive map of Lindores Abbey

Monastery information
- Established: 1191
- Disestablished: 1559

People
- Founder: David, Earl of Huntingdon

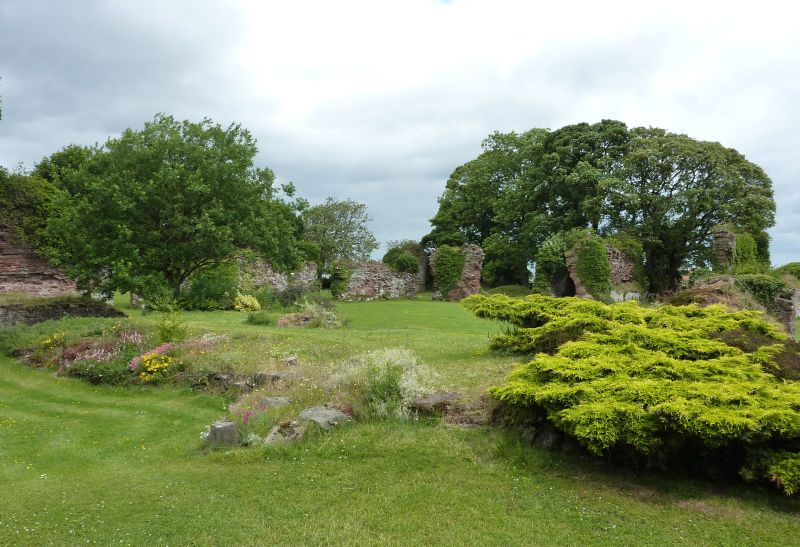
Ruins of Lindores Abbey

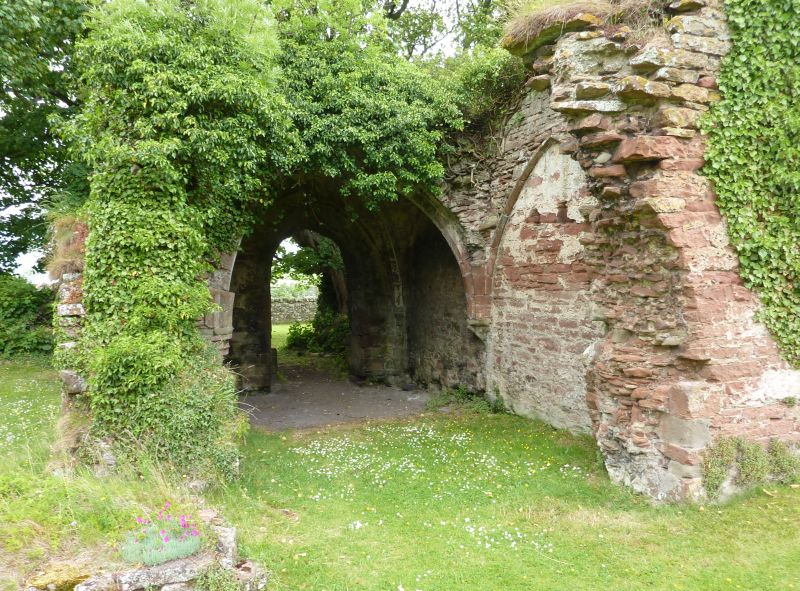
The eastern entrance

Lindores Abbey was a Tironensian abbey on the outskirts of Newburgh in Fife, Scotland. Now a reduced ruin, it lies on the southern banks of the River Tay, about 1-mile (1.6 km) north of the village of Lindores and is a scheduled monument.

The abbey was founded as a daughter house of Kelso Abbey in 1191 (some sources say 1178), by David, Earl of Huntingdon, on land granted to him by his brother William the Lion. The first abbot was Guido, Prior of Kelso, under whom the buildings were mostly completed. The church, dedicated to the Blessed Virgin and St. Andrew, was 195 feet (59 m) long, with transepts 110 feet (34 m) long. Edward I of England, John Balliol, David II, and James III were among the monarchs who visited Lindores at different times. The Abbey ceased operation in 1559.

== History ==
In the 12th century, David, Earl of Huntingdon, granted the abbey fishing rights around Mugdrum Island in the Firth of Tay. It was also granted salmon netting rights at Clashbenny and Red Sands on the north shore of the Firth by the Hay lords of Errol. In the 13th century, Conan, an illegitimate son of Henry, Earl of Atholl, gave the monks of Lindores rights to gather birch and alder logs and hazel rods from his wood at Tulyhen near Blair Atholl. The monks were active in pursuing legal actions to protect the grazing and forage rights of their tenants and dependents in Strathallan.

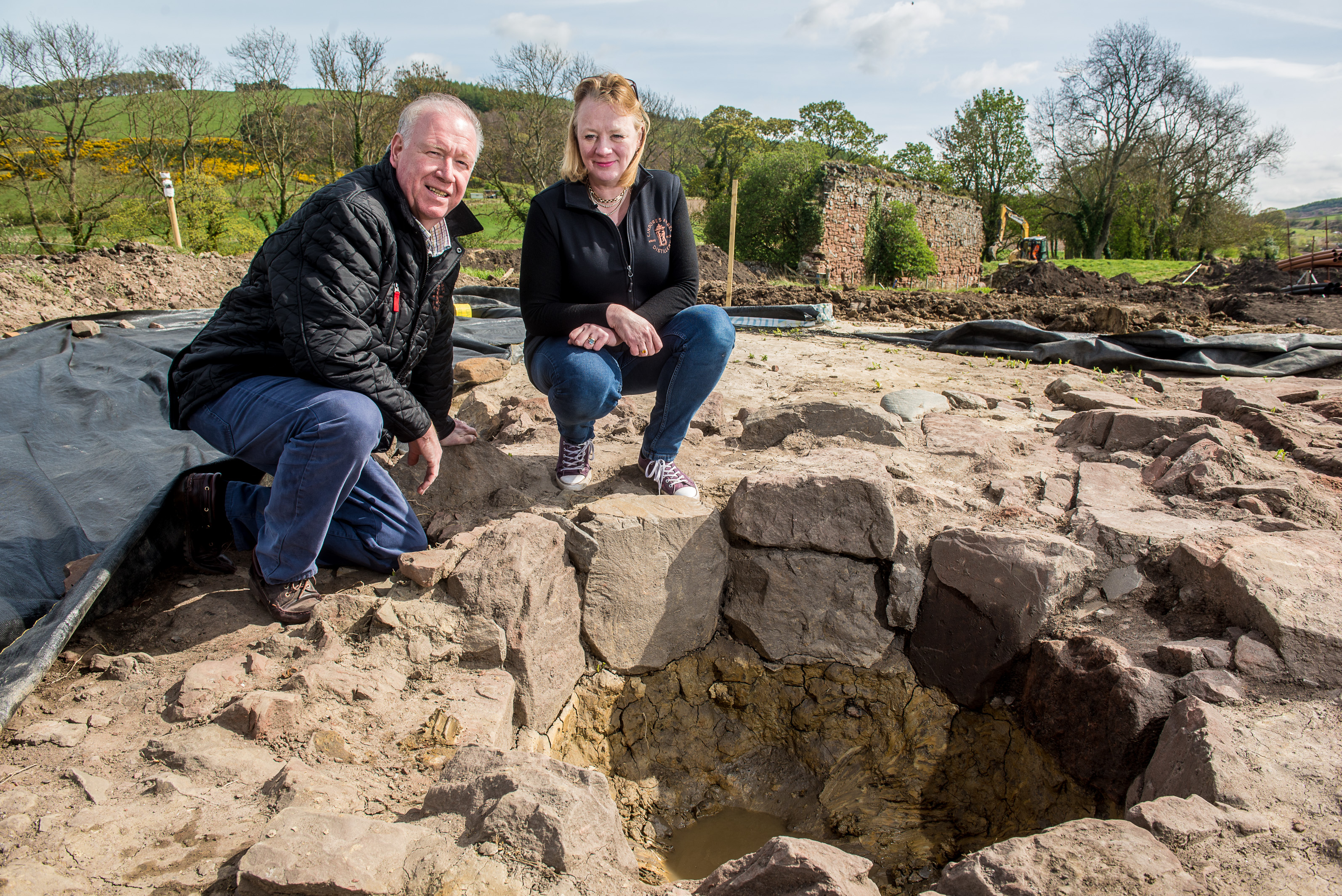
Still discovered at Lindores Abbey

David Stewart, Duke of Rothesay, who died during imprisonment at Falkland Palace in 1402, was buried at the Abbey.

The abbey was sacked by a mob from Dundee in 1543, and again by John Knox and his supporters in 1559. According to Knox, the Protestants overthrew the altars, broke up statues, burned the books and vestments and made them cast aside their monkish habits.

After the Reformation, the Abbey passed into the hands of a Commendator, one whose loyal service to the crown was rewarded by the gift of the ecclesiastical income and property. The monks remained for a time, but the Abbey began to be dismantled around 1584. In the following years the Abbey buildings were quarried as a source of building stone for Newburgh, and slate, timber and carvings from the Abbey as well as a number of architectural fragments are visible built into later structures in the town. When Patrick Leslie was Commendator, in August 1595, Anne of Denmark met the Earl of Orkney at Lindores .

The main upstanding remains of the Abbey are: one of the gateways leading into the monastic enclosure; the groin-vaulted slype, leading from the cloister garth to the exterior of the Abbey; and parts of the chancel walls and western tower of the church, although the ground plan of the whole structure can still be traced. Sections of the imposing precinct wall which once enclosed the abbey can also be seen in fields to the south.

Carved wooden panels from the Abbey of the early 16th century survive in the Laing Museum, Newburgh and, reset in a 19th-century cabinet, in St. Paul's Episcopal Cathedral, Dundee.

The monks distilled rose water at the Abbey, and in May 1540 rosewater and apples from Lindores were sent to James V.

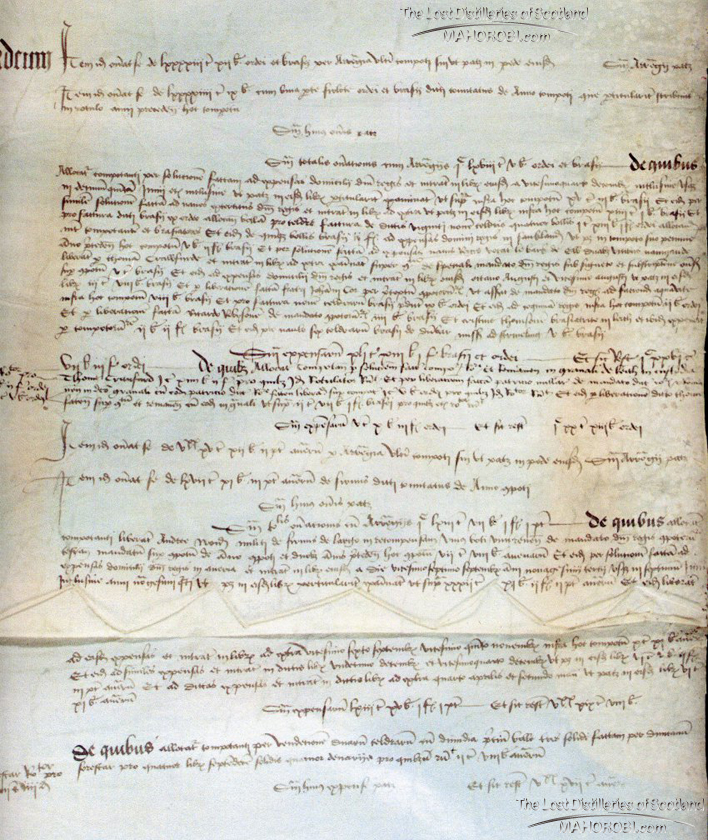
Exchequer Rolls mentioning Aqua Vitae and John Cor

In 2018 a distillation vat was discovered in the ruins, along with evidence of whisky production. The remains of the still are preserved for display in the ruins.

Since 2024, the University of St Andrews and Brandeis University have been operating a summer archaeological field school course at the site. They are investigating patterns of monastic water use.

== Lindores Abbey distillery ==
A whisky distillery, Lindores Abbey distillery is directly opposite the Abbey.

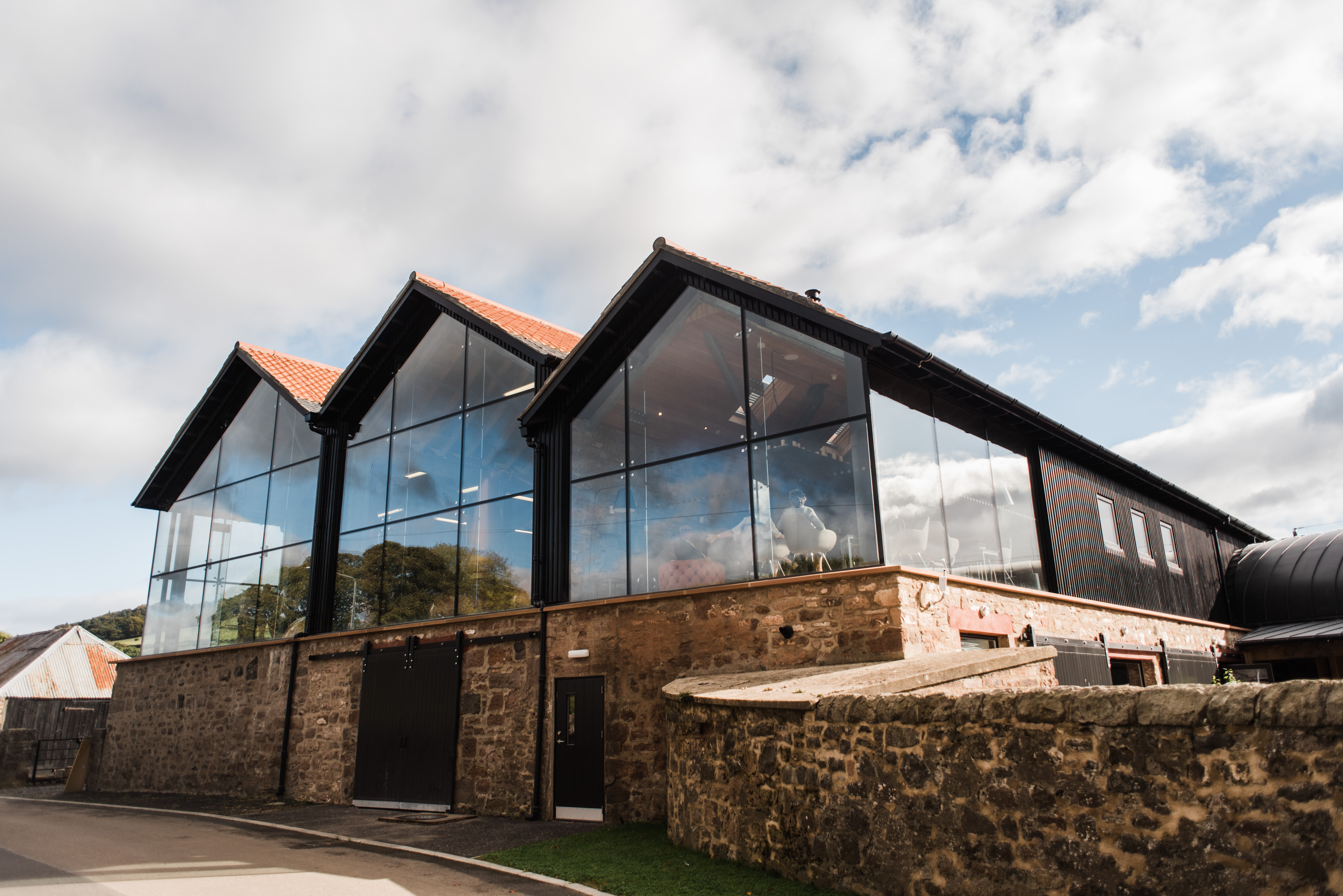
Lindores Abbey Distillery

A commercial distillery located by the site of Lindores Abbey opened in 2017 and began distilling Scotch whisky by December of that year.

== Burials ==
- James Douglas, 9th Earl of Douglas
- David Stewart, Duke of Rothesay
- Robert and Henry, infant sons of David I, Earl of Huntingdon

== See also ==
- Abbot of Lindores, for a list of abbots and commendators
- National Archives of Scotland for the exchequer roll
