= Dunaverty Castle =

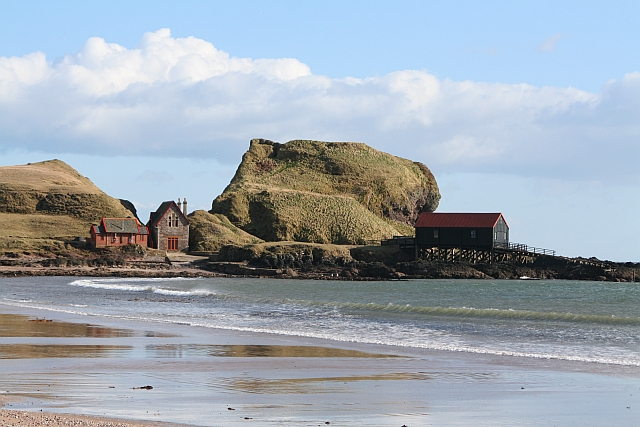
- The site of Dunaverty Castle

- Location in Argyll and Bute
- 55.3075°N 5.6447°W

Scheduled monument
- Reference no.: SM3041

Dunaverty Castle is located at Southend at the southern end of the Kintyre peninsula in western Scotland. The site was once a fort belonging to the Clan Donald (MacDonald). Little remains of the castle, although the site is protected as a scheduled monument.

== History ==
The remains of Dunaverty Castle stand on a rocky head land on the south east corner of Kintyre, Scotland. The headland it was built on forms a natural stronghold with the sea on three sides and is only approachable from the north. It is attached to the mainland only by a narrow path. It is known that the castle itself was accessed by a drawbridge.

=== 13th century ===
In 1248, Henry III, King of England allowed Walter Byset to buy stores from Ireland for Dunaverty Castle which he had seized and was fortifying, apparently in revenge for hospitality given by Alexander II, King of Scotland to certain English pirates. However, during that same year, the castle was taken by Allan, the son of the Earl of Atholl, and Byset was taken prisoner.

In 1263, Dunaverty Castle was garrisoned by Alexander III, King of Scotland during the Norwegian campaign of Hákon Hákonarson, King of Norway.

The castle was eventually surrendered to the Norwegian king, who in turn granted it to Dubhghall mac Ruaidhrí, one of his steadfast supporters in the Hebrides. With the evaporation of Norwegian sovereignty in the Hebrides after 1263, Alexander III appears to have retaken the castle.

=== 14th century ===
Late in 1306, the embattled Robert I, King of Scotland seems to have fled to the safety of Dunaverty Castle and his friend, Aonghus Óg Mac Domhnaill, the Lord of the Isles. According to The Bruce, the king was harboured there for three days by Aonghus Óg Mac Domhnaill, before Aonghus took him to Rathlin Island. Some contemporary sources suggest that the castle was already under the king's control, however, and that the king acquired it from a certain Maol Coluim in March. In September of that year, when the English arrived at the castle, the Scottish king was not to be found.

=== 15th century ===
In 1493, the fourth and last Lord of the Isles forfeited his title to James IV, King of Scotland. By 1494, the king had garrisoned and provisioned Dunaverty Castle. It is said that the MacDonalds, led by Sir John MacDonald whom the king had recently knighted, retook the castle before the King had even departed to Stirling and that the dead body of the King's castle governor was hung over the castle walls in sight of the King and his departing entourage. Sir John Macdonald however was later captured by MacIain of Ardnamurchan. He was tried and hanged on the Burgh Muir near Edinburgh.

=== 16th century ===
The castle was repaired by the crown between 1539 and 1542. In January 1544, a Commission in Queen Mary's name was given to the captain, constable and keeper of the Castle of Dunaverty, to deliver it with its artillery and ammunition to the Earl of Argyll and in April of that year Argyll received a 12-year tack of North and South Kintyre, including the castle.

The English raided Kintyre and Campbeltown Loch in October 1588 because of the activities of the Clan MacDonald in Ireland. The Earl of Sussex sailed from Dublin in the Mary Willoughby with a small fleet and burnt Saddell, Dunaverty and Machrimore. He then burnt farms on Arran, Bute, and Cumbrae.

=== 17th century ===
In 1626, the Lordship of Kintyre was reconstituted in favour of the Earl of Argyll and Dunaverty Castle was denoted as its principal messuage. Argyll bestowed the Lordship of Kintyre on James, his eldest son by his second marriage, who, in 1635, at Dunaverty, granted a charter of the Lordship to Viscount Dunluce, eldest son of Randal MacDonnell, 1st Earl of Antrim. The transfer was set aside by the Scottish Privy Council, no doubt on a complaint by Argyll's eldest son, the Marquis of Lorn, who had bitterly resented his father's bestowal of the Lordship on his younger half-brother. On 12 December 1636, Lorn received a charter, under the Great Seal, of the Lordship of Kintyre, with the Castle of Dunaverty as its principal messuage.

During the Civil War Dunaverty was besieged in 1647 by Scottish supporters of Oliver Cromwell who were led by General David Leslie (Leslie later became a Royalist). The MacDonalds surrendered and then 300 of them were massacred. This incident became known as the Battle of Dunaverty, or "Dunaverty Massacre". The castle is nothing more than a ruin now, known as Blood Rock for the massacre which took place there.

== See also ==
- Scottish castles
