= Newark Castle, Fife =

Coordinates: 56°12′5.35″N 2°46′34.18″W

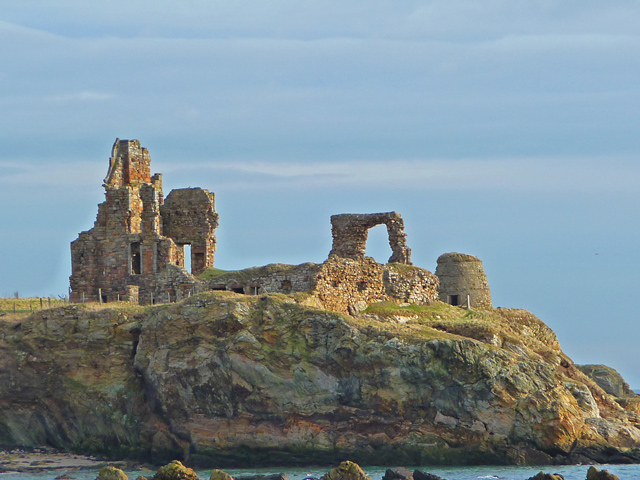
The ruins of Newark Castle on the Fife coast

Newark Castle is a ruin located just west of St Monans, on the east coast of Fife, Scotland. The building, built in the 15th century, stands in a dramatic location, overlooking the North Sea. The upper storeys are ruinous, but vaulted cellars survive, hidden from view.

== History ==
The current building was begun in the 15th century by the Kinloch family. It then passed, through marriage, to the Sandilands of Cruivie, who sold it in 1649 David Leslie. Leslie was a prominent figure in the English and Scottish Civil Wars, becoming Lord Newark after the wars. Following Leslie's death in 1682, the castle passed to the Anstruther family, and finally to the Bairds of Elie.

The castle attracted the attention of Sir William Burrell, the Glasgow shipping magnate and collector of art and antiques, in the late 19th century when Sir Robert Lorimer produced a plan for its restoration. The scheme never went ahead as the owner of the site, a Mr Baird of Elie, refused to sell.

The castle has been known by several names, including Inverie, St Monans and St Monance (the latter being a mediaeval form of the possessive St Monan's). It has been designated by Historic Environment Scotland, together with its associated dovecote, as a scheduled monument.
