= Patrick Leslie, 1st Lord Lindores =

Scottish noble (died 1608)

Patrick Leslie, 1st Lord Lindores (died 1608) was a member of the Scottish nobility.

== Biography ==
He was the second son of Andrew Leslie, 5th Earl of Rothes, and his first wife, Grizel Hamilton. He was Commendator of Lindores as early as 1569 and until 1600. In July 1585, he was in charge of the former favourite, James Stewart, Earl of Arran, who was held at St Andrews Castle.

His wife, Jean Stewart, was invited to attend the coronation of Anne of Denmark. In November 1591, the rebel Earl of Bothwell told his wife that he planned to visit her father Robert Stewart, 1st Earl of Orkney, in Orkney, and it was thought for a time that Bothwell planned to invade the island.

Leslie and Jean Stewart witnessed the will of Robert Stewart, Earl of Orkney, at the Palace of Yards in Kirkwall on 2 February 1593.

Leslie had a role in devising the entertainments at the baptism of Prince Henry at Stirling Castle in August 1594. John Colville called him "the great Master of Ceremonies at this baptism". Lindores rode in the tournament of running at the ring dressed as Penthesilea Queen of the Amazons.

Anne of Denmark and the Earl of Orkney stayed with him at Lindores in August 1595.

In September 1598 James VI came to Abdie to arrest John Arnot, Goodman of Woodmill, for the murder of John Murray, a servant of Lord Lindores. Patrick was created Lord Lindores at the baptism of Prince Charles in 1600.

In July 1607 Lindores wrote a letter of petition to the Earl of Salisbury. He said he had served King James since 1579, 14 years in his bedchamber. The petition followed expenses made to get his brother-in-law, Sir Robert Stewart, out of the Counter Prison, helped by Lord Roxburghe and the Master of Orkney.

He died between 22 May and 5 October 1608.

== Family ==
Leslie married Jean Stewart (c. 1563 – ?), daughter of Robert Stewart, 1st Earl of Orkney and Jean Kennedy. Robert Stewart was a natural son of King James V of Scotland by Euphemia Elphinstone.

The children of Patrick Leslie and Jean Stewart included:

- Patrick Leslie, 2nd Lord Lindores (d. 1649)
- James Leslie, 3rd Lord Lindores, who married Elizabeth Yorke, a daughter of John Yorke of Goulthwaite Hall.
- Robert Leslie of Kinclaven, Perthshire, and of Westminster, London (c. 1598 – c. 1675), married first Frances, widow of Sir John Pakington and daughter of John and Dorothy (Puckering) Ferrers, and married second, at St Giles in the Fields, London, on 4 November 1633, Catherine, daughter of Edward and Elizabeth (Pigott) Bassett
- Ludovick Leslie
- David Leslie, 1st Lord Newark (c. 1601 – 1682), who married Jane Yorke, a daughter of John Yorke of Goulthwaite.
- George Leslie
- Henry Leslie
- Margaret Leslie, married (contract 1609) John Drummond, 2nd Lord Maderty
- Elizabeth Leslie, married (contract 1628) Sir James Sinclair
- Anna Leslie, married John Forbes
- Janet Leslie, married Sir John Cunningham
- Euphemia Leslie, married c. 1616 Sir David Barclay

After the death of Patrick Leslie, Jean Stewart wrote to James VI and I hoping for financial support to help the marriages of her daughters.

Peerage of Scotland
New creation	Lord Lindores; 1600–1608	Succeeded by Patrick Leslie
