= Battle of Dunaverty =

1647 battle and siege in Scotland

Coordinates: 55°18′27″N 5°38′41″W

- Part of the Scottish Civil War
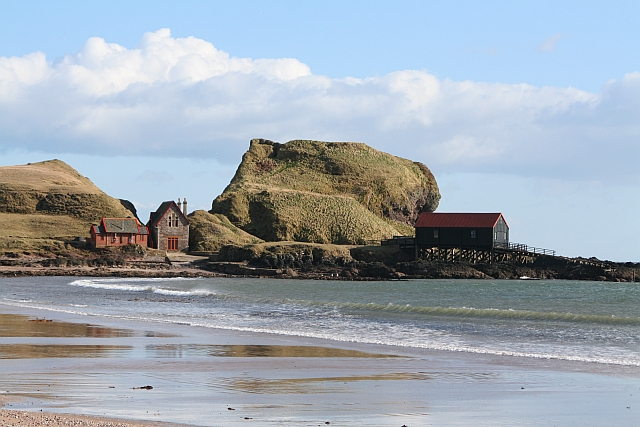
- The site of Dunaverty Castle
Date	1647
Location	Dunaverty Castle, Kintyre, Scotland
Result	Covenanter Victory

Belligerents
Royalists	Covenanters

Commanders and leaders
Archibald Og of Sanda	David Leslie

Strength
200–300	Unknown
- Scotland

The Battle of Dunaverty involved a battle and the siege of Dunaverty Castle in Kintyre, Scotland, in 1647. The events involved the Covenanter Army under the command of General David Leslie on one side and 200–300 Highland troops under the command of Archibald Og of Sanda on the other.

After the Battle of Rhunahaorine Moss, the remaining royalist army of Alasdair Mac Colla fled to Kinlochkilkerran, where a fleet of birlinns transported many of the troops to Ireland, while others fled to Dunaverty to be transported to Ireland as well as Dunyvaig Castle. About 200 to 300 men who could not be transported or did not wish to leave Scotland prepared to defend the castle.

When the Covenanter Army arrived, they laid siege to the castle and made small raids against the forces inside. Once the attackers had captured the stronghold's water supply, the defenders – by now running out of water – requested a surrender on fair terms. After agreeing to surrender and leaving the castle, the men, women and children were put to the sword at the request of Reverend John Naves and Archibald Campbell, 1st Marquess of Argyll. More than 300 MacDonalds and followers, men, women and children, were slaughtered at Dunaverty, despite the promised quarter from the Covenanters. However, a number of people appear to have survived the massacre, including Flora McCambridge, the infant Ranald MacDonald of Sanda, James Stewart and a MacDougall of Kilmun.

== General references ==
- Campbell, Lord Archibald (1885). Records of Argyll: Legends, Traditions and Recollections of Argyllshire Highlanders. Edinburgh: William Blackwood & Sons.
