= Mark Kishlansky =

American historian

Kishlansky in London, 2003

Mark Kishlansky (October 11, 1948 – May 19, 2015) was an American historian of seventeenth-century British politics. He was the Frank Baird, Jr. Professor of History at Harvard University.

== Education and academic career ==
Kishlansky was born in Brooklyn. He completed his undergraduate degree at the State University of New York at Stony Brook in 1970. He proceeded to graduate study under David Underdown at Brown University, receiving his M.A. in 1972 and his PhD in 1977. His PhD thesis was titled "The Emergence of Radical Politics in the English Revolution". From 1975 to 1991 he taught at the University of Chicago, successively as instructor and professor. From 1990 to 1991 he was a member of the Committee on Social Thought. He was a visiting professor at Northwestern University in 1983 and was the Mellon Visiting Professor in the Humanities and Social Sciences at the California Institute of Technology in 1990–91. In 1991 he became a professor at Harvard University and from 1998 to 2001 served as Associate Dean of the Harvard Faculty of Arts and Sciences. He was editor of the Journal of British Studies from 1984 to 1991 and editor-in-chief of History Compass from 2003 to 2009.

Along with Kevin Sharpe, Conrad Russell and John Morrill, Kishlansky pioneered the revisionist interpretation of early Stuart history. Unlike previous scholars who had seen the Civil Wars of the 1640s as stemming from the growth of ideological opposition to the Stuart monarchs over the previous half-century, the revisionists argued that an ideological consensus had prevailed at least until the early 1620s. This consensus, in their view, was unsettled in the late 1620s and afterwards by religious disputes and by the crown's fiscal problems. The revisionist school sought to counter interpretations of the English Civil Wars that had been advanced by historians influenced by Marxist and Whiggish models of historical development. Kishlansky advanced his interpretation in an article in 1977 in The Journal of Modern History and in two books, The Rise of the New Model Army (1979) and Parliamentary Selection (1986).

In the early 1990s Kishlansky became involved in a controversy with the University of Cambridge historian, John Adamson. The controversy began in 1990 when Kishlansky published an article in the Historical Journal criticising Adamson's use of sources. Kishlansky, contending that Adamson had overstated the influence of Viscount Saye and Sele in the parliamentary politics of the mid-1640s and had misrepresented the original sources he had analysed, entitled his article "Saye What?" Adamson responded with an article entitled "Politics and the Nobility in Civil-War England" exposing Kishlansky's own archival source problems and Kishlansky responded reiterating his case with an article titled "Saye No More". This was followed by an exchange of letters in the Times Literary Supplement in 1992, provoked by a review written by Lawrence Stone that mentioned the controversy. A series of historians commented on the debate in the letters pages of the TLS, including Conrad Russell, Hugh Trevor-Roper, Kishlansky and Adamson. This was covered in the British press, with The Times describing it as a "fierce high table row" and The Independent calling it a "most uncivil war". The Sunday Times described it as a "historians' brawl" that had "shocked the academic community".

In addition to his publications on Stuart history, Kishlansky co-authored a number of textbooks, most notably Civilization in the West (with Patrick Geary and Patricia O'Brien), Societies and Cultures in World History (with Patrick Geary, Patricia O'Brien and R. Bin Wong), and The Unfinished Legacy (with Patrick Geary and Patricia O'Brien). He was a consulting editor for Prentice-Hall and served as a consulting editor for Longman Publications (2006–08), HarperCollins (1990–96), Scott, Foresman Co. (1987–89) and George Allen & Unwin (1984–86).

Kishlansky died on May 19, 2015, at age 66.

== Recognition ==
Kishlansky was a fellow of the Massachusetts Historical Society and the Royal Historical Society. He held research fellowships from the National Endowment for the Humanities in 1983–84 and the Newberry Library in 1987–88. He received a Distinguished Alumni Award from the State University of New York at Stony Brook in 1989. He held the Fletcher Jones Research Fellowship at the Huntington Library in 1990. He held the Walter Channing Cabot Fellowship for 1995–96.

== Publications ==
- Charles I: An Abbreviated Life (Penguin, 2014). ISBN 9780141979847
- The Rise of the New Model Army (Cambridge University Press, 1979). ISBN 978-0521273770
- Parliamentary Selection: Social and Political Choice in Early Modern England (Cambridge University Press, 1986). ISBN 978-0521311168
- Political Culture and Cultural Politics in Early Modern England, ed. with Susan Amussen (Manchester University Press, 1995). ISBN 978-0719046957
- A Monarchy Transformed: Britain, 1603-1714 (The Penguin History of Britain, vol. 6, 1996). ISBN 978-0140148275
- "The Sale of Crown Lands and the Spirit of the Revolution," Economic History Review, 2nd. ser., vol. 29 (1976), pp. 125–30.
- "The Emergence of Adversary Politics in the Long Parliament," Journal of Modern History, vol. 49 (1977), pp. 617–40. Reprinted in Richard Cust and Ann Hughes (eds.), The English Civil War (Arnold, 1997).
- "The Case of the Army Truly Stated," Past and Present, no. 81 (1978), pp. 51–74.
- "The Army and the Levellers: The Roads to Putney," Historical Journal, vol. 22 (1979), pp. 795–824.
- "Community and Continuity," William and Mary Quarterly, 3rd, ser., vol. 37 (1980), pp. 139–46.
- "Consensus Politics and the Structure of Debate at Putney," Journal of British Studies, vol. 20 (1981), pp. 50–69; reprinted in J. Jacobs and M. Jacobs (eds.), Anglo-American Radicalism (George Allen & Unwin, 1983).
- "Ideology and Politics in the Parliamentary Armies, 1645–49," in J.S. Morrill, (ed.), Reactions to the English Civil War (Macmillan, 1982), pp. 163–84.
- "What Happened at Ware?," Historical Journal, vol. 25 (1982), pp. 827–39.
- "Saye What?" Historical Journal, vol. 33 (1990), pp. 917–37
- "Saye No More," Journal of British Studies, vol. 30 (1991), pp. 399–448.
- “Turning Frogs into Princes: Aesop’s Fables and the Political Culture of Early Modern England,” in M. A. Kishlansky and S. D. Amussen, eds., Political Culture and Cultural Politics in Early Modern England (Manchester University Press, 1995), pp. 338–60.
- “Tyranny Denied: Charles I, Attorney General Heath, and the Five Knights’ Case,” Historical Journal, vol. 42 (1999), pp. 53–83.
- “Charles I,” Oxford Dictionary of National Biography (2004).
- “Charles I: A Case of Mistaken Identity,” Past and Present, no. 189 (Nov. 2005), pp. 41–80.
- “A Lesson in Loyalty: Charles I and the Short Parliament,” in Jason McElligot and David L. Smith (eds.), Royalists and Royalism during the English Civil Wars (Cambridge University Press, 2007), pp. 16–42.
- “Debate: Charles I: A Case of Mistaken Identity,” Past and Present, no. 205 (Nov. 2009), pp. 212–37.
- “Mission Impossible: Charles I, Oliver Cromwell and the Regicide,” English Historical Review, vol. 125 (2010), pp. 844–74.
- “JSM: A Tribute,” in M. Braddick and D. L. Smith (eds.), The Experience of Revolution in Stuart Britain and Ireland (Cambridge University press, 2011), pp. xvii–xxxv.
- Civilization in the West, with Patrick Geary and Patricia O'Brien (HarperCollins, 1991, 2nd. edition 1995; Longmans 3rd. edition 1997, 4th edition 2001, ABLongmans 5th edition 2003; 6th edition, 2005; Pearson 7th edition 2007).
- Sources of the West, ed., 2 vols. (HarperCollins, 1991, 2nd. edition 1995; Longmans 3rd. edition 1998; 4th edition 2001, ABLongmans 5th edition 2003; 6th edition 2005; Pearson 7th edition 2007; Prentice Hall 8th edition 2011).
- Societies and Cultures in World History, with Patrick Geary and Patricia O'Brien and R. Bin Wong (HarperCollins, 1995).
- Sources of World History, ed., 2 vols (HarperCollins, 1995, 2nd. Ed. West, 1998; 3rd edition 2002; Cengage 4th edition 2006; 5th edition 2011).
- The Unfinished Legacy, with Patrick Geary and Patricia O'Brien (HarperCollins, 1993; 2nd. edition 1996, ABLongman 3rd edition 2002; 4th edition 2005; Penguin Academic 5th edition 2008; Prentice Hall 6th edition 2010).
- The Meridians: Sources in World History (Pearson Publishing 2005)
- Interpretations of the West: A Custom Database (Pearson Publishing 2004)
- “A Whipper Whipped: The Sedition of William Prynne,” Historical Journal, vol. 56 (2013), pp. 603–27.
- “Martyrs' Tales,” Journal of British Studies, vol. 53 (2014), pp. 334–55.
- Charles I: An Abbreviated Life (Penguin 2014)
