= Charles I of England =

King of England, Scotland and Ireland from 1625 to 1649

Charles I
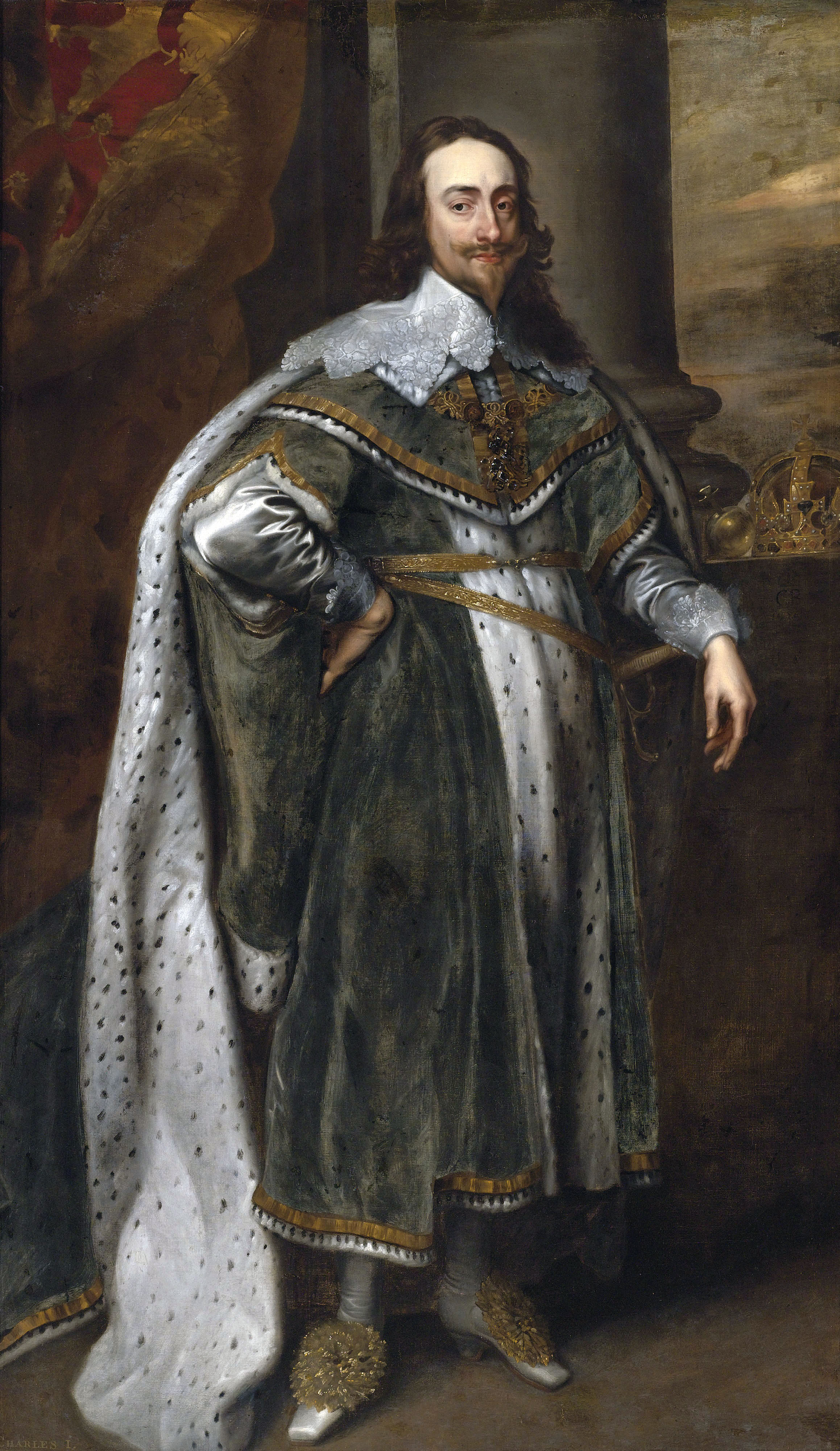
- Portrait, 1636

King of England and Ireland
- Reign: 27 March 1625 – 30 January 1649
- Coronation: 2 February 1626
- Predecessor: James I
- Successor: Charles II (de jure); Council of State (de facto)

King of Scotland
- Reign: 27 March 1625 – 30 January 1649
- Coronation: 18 June 1633
- Predecessor: James VI
- Successor: Charles II
- Born: 19 November 1600; Dunfermline Palace, Dunfermline, Scotland
- Died: 30 January 1649 (aged 48); Whitehall, Westminster, England
- Cause of death: Execution by beheading
- Burial: 9 February 1649; St George's Chapel, Windsor Castle, England
- Spouse: Henrietta Maria of France (m. 1625)
- Issue more...: Charles II; Mary, Princess of Orange; James VII & II; Elizabeth; Anne; Henry, Duke of Gloucester; Henrietta, Duchess of Orléans
- House: Stuart
- Father: James VI and I
- Mother: Anne of Denmark
- Religion: Protestant

Charles I (19 November 1600 – 30 January 1649) (Note: All dates in this article are given in the Julian calendar, which was used in Great Britain and Ireland throughout Charles's lifetime. However, years are assumed to start on 1 January rather than 25 March, which was the English New Year until 1752.) was King of England, Scotland, and Ireland from 27 March 1625 until his execution in 1649.

Charles was born into the House of Stuart as the second son of King James VI of Scotland. After his father inherited the English throne in 1603, he moved to England, where he spent much of the rest of his life. He became heir apparent to the kingdoms of England, Scotland, and Ireland in 1612 upon the death of his elder brother, Henry Frederick, Prince of Wales. An unsuccessful and unpopular attempt to marry him to Infanta Maria Anna of Spain culminated in an eight-month visit to Spain in 1623, which demonstrated the futility of the marriage negotiations. Two years later, shortly after his accession, he married Henrietta Maria of France.

After his accession in 1625, Charles quarrelled with the English Parliament, which sought to curb his royal prerogative. He believed in the divine right of kings and was determined to govern according to his own conscience. Many of his subjects opposed his policies, in particular the levying of taxes without Parliamentary consent, and perceived his actions as those of a tyrannical absolute monarch. His religious policies, coupled with his marriage to a Catholic, generated antipathy and mistrust from Reformed religious groups such as the English Puritans and Scottish Covenanters, who thought his views too Catholic. He supported high church Anglican ecclesiastics and failed to aid continental Protestant forces successfully during the Thirty Years' War. His attempts to force the Church of Scotland to adopt high Anglican practices led to the Bishops' Wars, strengthened the position of the English and Scottish parliaments, and helped precipitate his own downfall.

From 1642, Charles fought the armies of the English and Scottish parliaments in the English Civil War. After his defeat in 1645 at the hands of the Parliamentarian New Model Army, he fled north from his base at Oxford. Charles surrendered to a Scottish force and, after lengthy negotiations between the English and Scottish parliaments, was handed over to the Long Parliament in London. Charles refused to accept his captors' demands for a constitutional monarchy, and temporarily escaped captivity in November 1647. Re-imprisoned on the Isle of Wight, he allied with Scotland, but by the end of 1648, the New Model Army had consolidated its control over England. Charles was tried, convicted, and executed for high treason in January 1649. The monarchy was abolished and the Commonwealth of England was established as a republic. The monarchy was restored in 1660, with Charles's son Charles II as king.

== Early life ==
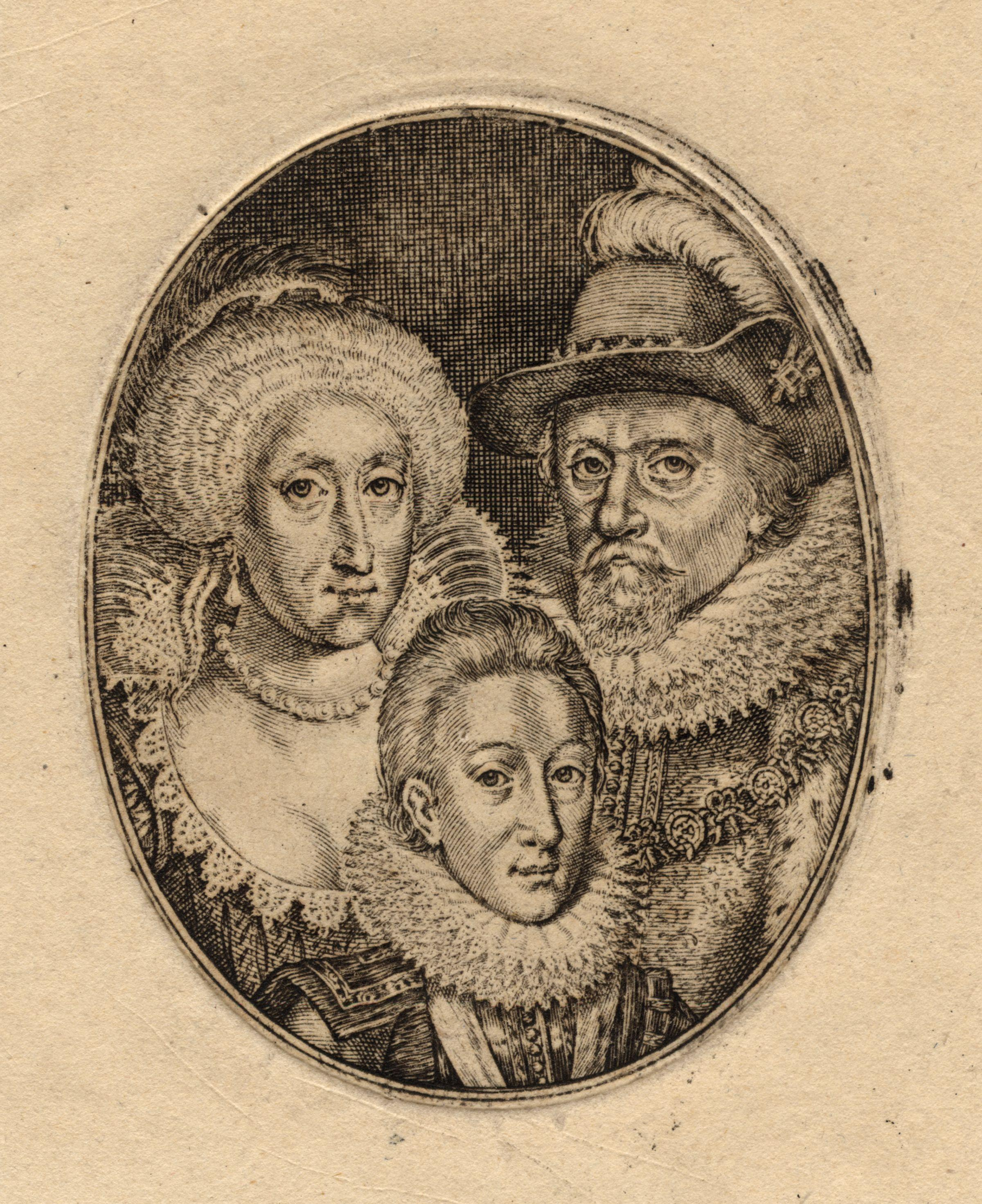
Engraving by Simon de Passe of Charles and his parents, King James and Queen Anne, c. 1612

The second son of King James VI of Scotland and Anne of Denmark, Charles was born at Dunfermline Palace, Fife, on 19 November 1600. At a Protestant ceremony in the Chapel Royal of Holyrood Palace in Edinburgh on 23 December 1600, he was baptised by David Lindsay, Bishop of Ross, and created Duke of Albany, the traditional title of the second son of the king of Scotland, with the subsidiary titles of Marquess of Ormond, Earl of Ross and Lord Ardmannoch.

James VI was the first cousin twice removed of Queen Elizabeth I of England, and when she died childless in March 1603, he became king of England as James I. Charles was a weak and sickly infant, and while his parents and older siblings left for England in April and early June that year, due to his fragile health, he remained in Scotland with his father's friend Lord Fyvie appointed as his guardian.

By 1604, when Charles was three-and-a-half, he was able to walk the length of the great hall at Dunfermline Palace without assistance, and it was decided that he was strong enough to journey to England to be reunited with his family. In mid-July 1604, he left Dunfermline for England, where he was to spend most of the rest of his life. In England, Charles was placed under the charge of Elizabeth, Lady Carey, the wife of courtier Sir Robert Carey, who put him in boots made of Spanish leather and brass to help strengthen his weak ankles. His speech development was also slow, and he had a stammer for the rest of his life.

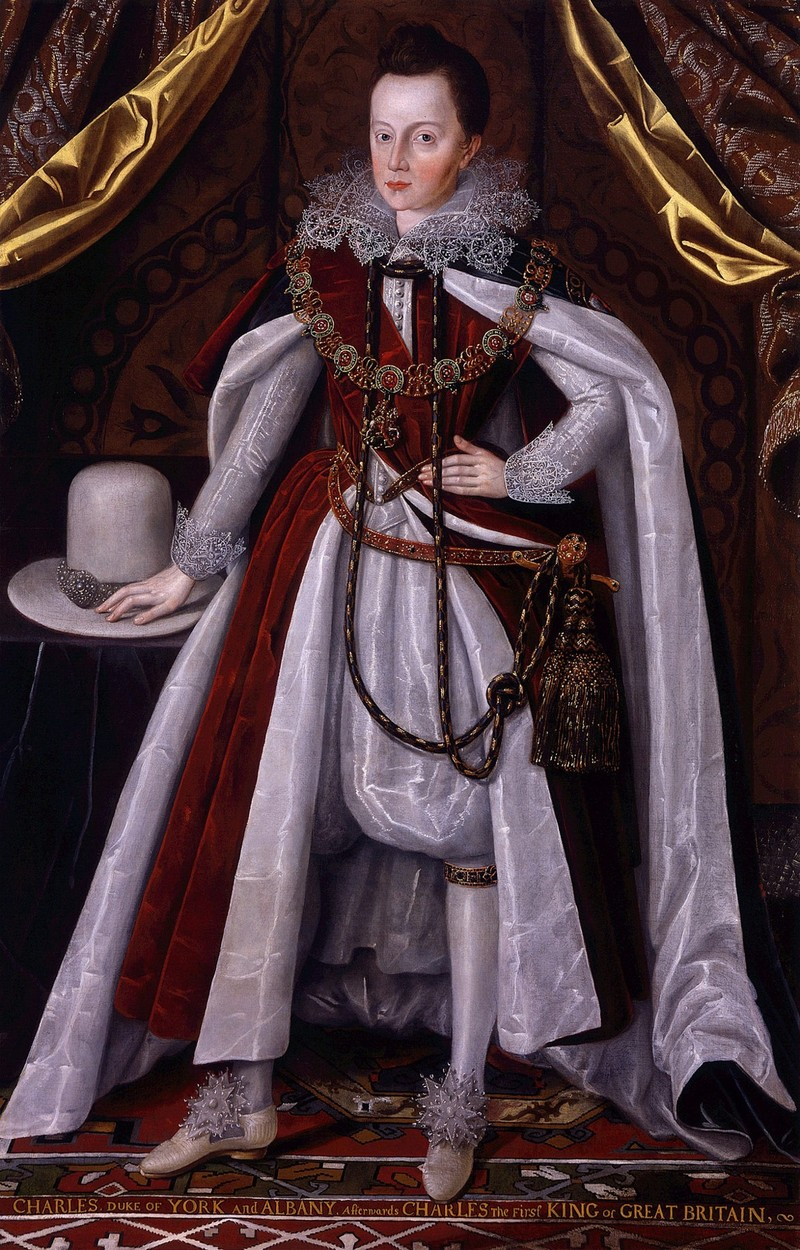
Portrait by Robert Peake the Elder, c. 1611

In January 1605, Charles was created Duke of York, as is customary in the case of the English sovereign's second son, and made a Knight of the Bath. Thomas Murray, a presbyterian Scot, was appointed as a tutor. Charles learnt the usual subjects of classics, languages, mathematics and religion. In 1611, he was made a Knight of the Garter.

Eventually, Charles apparently conquered his physical infirmity, which might have been caused by rickets. He became an adept horseman and marksman, and took up fencing. Even so, his public profile remained low in contrast to that of his physically stronger and taller (Note: Charles grew to a peak height of 5 feet 4 inches (163 cm).) elder brother, Henry Frederick, Prince of Wales, whom Charles adored and attempted to emulate. But in early November 1612, Henry died at the age of 18 of what is suspected to have been typhoid (or possibly porphyria). Charles, who turned 12 two weeks later, became heir apparent. As the eldest surviving son of the sovereign, he automatically gained several titles, including Duke of Cornwall and Duke of Rothesay. In November 1616, he was created Prince of Wales and Earl of Chester.

== Heir apparent ==
In 1613, Charles's sister Elizabeth married Elector Frederick V of the Palatinate, and moved to Heidelberg. In 1617, the Habsburg Archduke Ferdinand of Austria, a Catholic, was elected king of Bohemia. The next year, the Bohemians rebelled, defenestrating the Catholic governors. In August 1619, the Bohemian Diet chose Frederick, who led the Protestant Union, as their monarch, while Ferdinand was elected Holy Roman Emperor in the imperial election. Frederick's acceptance of the Bohemian crown in defiance of the Emperor marked the beginning of the turmoil that would develop into the Thirty Years' War. The conflict, originally confined to Bohemia, spiralled into a wider European war, which the English Parliament and public quickly grew to see as a polarised continental struggle between Catholics and Protestants. In 1620, King Frederick was defeated at the Battle of White Mountain near Prague and his hereditary lands in the Electoral Palatinate were invaded by a Habsburg force from the Spanish Netherlands. James, however, had been seeking marriage between Prince Charles and Ferdinand's niece, Infanta Maria Anna of Spain, and began to see the Spanish match as a possible diplomatic means of achieving peace in Europe.

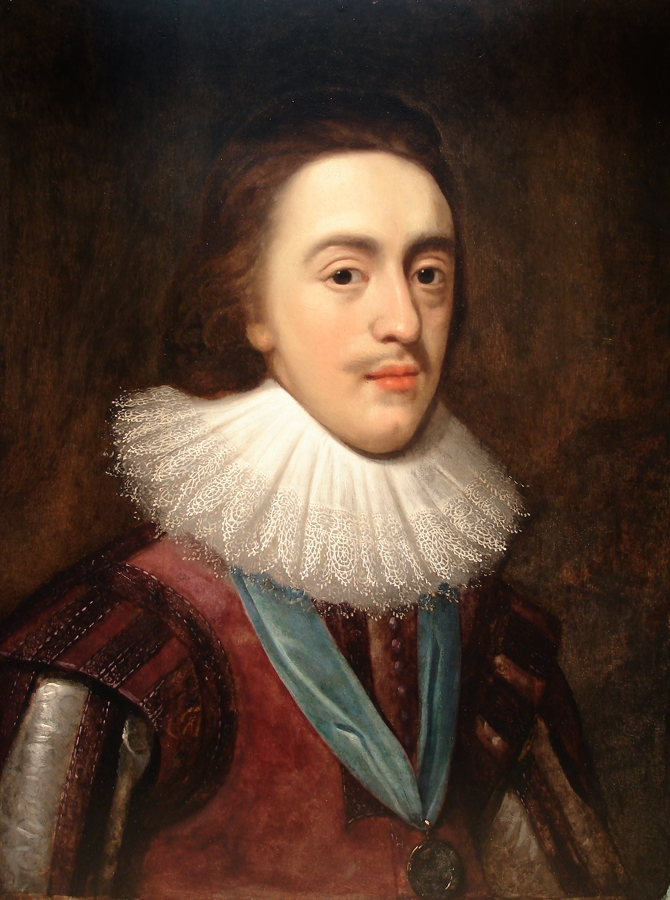
Portrait of Charles as Prince of Wales after Daniel Mytens, c. 1623

Negotiation with Spain proved unpopular with both the public and James's court. The English Parliament was actively hostile towards Spain and Catholicism, and thus, when called by James in 1621, the members hoped for an enforcement of recusancy laws, a naval campaign against Spain, and a Protestant marriage for the Prince of Wales. James's Lord Chancellor, Francis Bacon, was impeached before the House of Lords for corruption. The impeachment was the first since 1459 without the King's official sanction in the form of a bill of attainder. The incident set an important precedent as the process of impeachment would later be used against Charles and his supporters George Villiers, 1st Duke of Buckingham, Archbishop William Laud, and Thomas Wentworth, 1st Earl of Strafford. James insisted that the House of Commons be concerned exclusively with domestic affairs, while the members protested that they had the privilege of free speech within the Commons' walls, demanding war with Spain and a Protestant princess of Wales. Like his father, Charles considered discussion of his marriage in the Commons impertinent and an infringement of his father's royal prerogative. In January 1622, James dissolved Parliament, angry at what he perceived as the members' impudence and intransigence.

Charles and Buckingham, James's favourite and a man who had great influence over the prince, travelled incognito to Spain in February 1623 to try to reach agreement on the long-pending Spanish match. The trip was an embarrassing failure. The infanta thought Charles little more than an infidel, and the Spanish at first demanded that he convert to Catholicism as a condition of the match. They insisted on toleration of Catholics in England and the repeal of the English penal laws, which Charles knew Parliament would not agree to, and that the infanta remain in Spain for a year after any wedding to ensure that England complied with all the treaty's terms. A personal quarrel erupted between Buckingham and Gaspar de Guzmán, Count-Duke of Olivares, the Spanish chief minister, and so Charles conducted the ultimately futile negotiations personally. When he returned to London in October, without a bride and to a rapturous and relieved public welcome, he and Buckingham pushed the reluctant James to declare war on Spain.

With the encouragement of his Protestant advisers, James summoned the English Parliament in 1624 to request subsidies for a war. Charles and Buckingham supported the impeachment of the Lord Treasurer, Lionel Cranfield, 1st Earl of Middlesex, who opposed war on grounds of cost and quickly fell in much the same manner Bacon had. James told Buckingham he was a fool, and presciently warned Charles that he would live to regret the revival of impeachment as a parliamentary tool. An underfunded makeshift army under Ernst von Mansfeld set off to recover the Palatinate, but it was so poorly provisioned that it never advanced beyond the Dutch coast.

By 1624, the increasingly ill James was finding it difficult to control Parliament. By the time of his death in March 1625, Charles and Buckingham had already assumed de facto control of the kingdom.

== Early reign ==
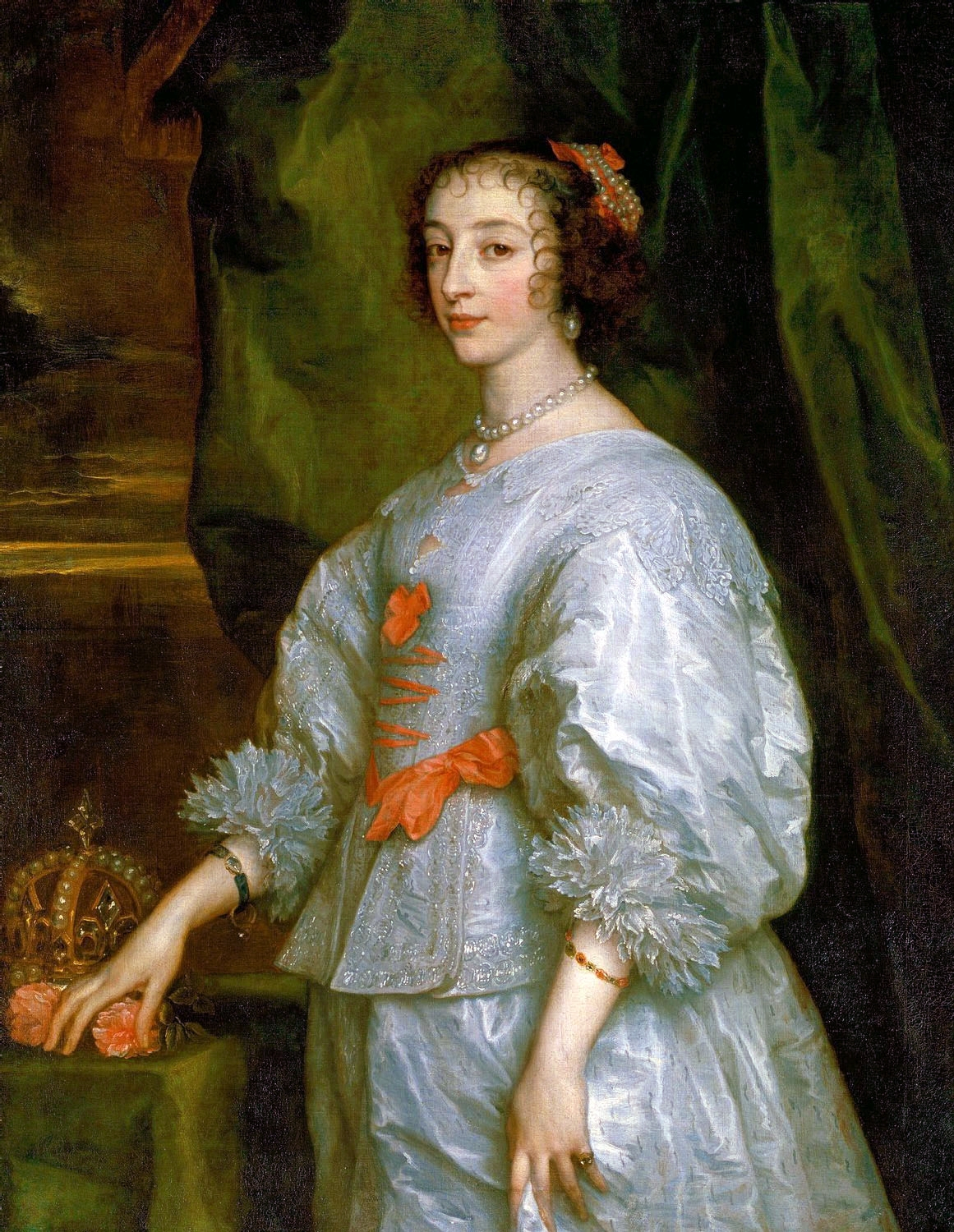
Queen Henrietta Maria by van Dyck, 1632

With the failure of the Spanish match, Charles and Buckingham turned their attention to France. On 1 May 1625 Charles was married by proxy to the 15-year-old French princess Henrietta Maria in front of the doors of Notre Dame de Paris. He had seen her in Paris while en route to Spain. They met in person on 13 June 1625 in Canterbury. Charles delayed the opening of his first Parliament until after the marriage was consummated, to forestall any opposition. Many members of the Commons opposed his marriage to a Catholic, fearing that he would lift restrictions on Catholic recusants and undermine the official establishment of the reformed Church of England. Charles told Parliament that he would not relax religious restrictions, but promised to do exactly that in a secret marriage treaty with his brother-in-law Louis XIII of France. Moreover, the treaty loaned to the French seven English naval ships that were used to suppress the Protestant Huguenots at La Rochelle in September 1625. Charles was crowned on 2 February 1626 at Westminster Abbey, but without his wife at his side, because she refused to participate in a Protestant religious ceremony.

Distrust of Charles's religious policies increased with his support of a controversial anti-Calvinist ecclesiastic, Richard Montagu, who was in disrepute among the Puritans. In his pamphlet A New Gag for an Old Goose (1624), a reply to the Catholic pamphlet A New Gag for the New Gospel, Montagu argued against Calvinist predestination, the doctrine that God preordained salvation and damnation. Anti-Calvinists—known as Arminians—believed that people could accept or reject salvation by exercising free will. Arminian divines had been one of the few sources of support for Charles's proposed Spanish marriage. With King James's support, Montagu produced another pamphlet, Appello Caesarem, published in 1625 shortly after James's death and Charles's accession. To protect Montagu from the stricture of Puritan members of Parliament, Charles made him a royal chaplain, heightening many Puritans' suspicions that Charles favoured Arminianism as a clandestine attempt to aid Catholicism's resurgence.

Rather than direct involvement in the European land war, the English Parliament preferred a relatively inexpensive naval attack on Spanish colonies in the New World, hoping for the capture of the Spanish treasure fleets. Parliament voted to grant a subsidy of £140,000, an insufficient sum for Charles's war plans. Moreover, the House of Commons limited its authorisation for royal collection of tonnage and poundage (two varieties of customs duties) to a year, although previous sovereigns since Henry VI had been granted the right for life. In this manner, Parliament could delay approval of the rates until after a full-scale review of customs revenue. The bill made no progress in the House of Lords past its first reading. Although no act of Parliament for the levy of tonnage and poundage was obtained, Charles continued to collect the duties.

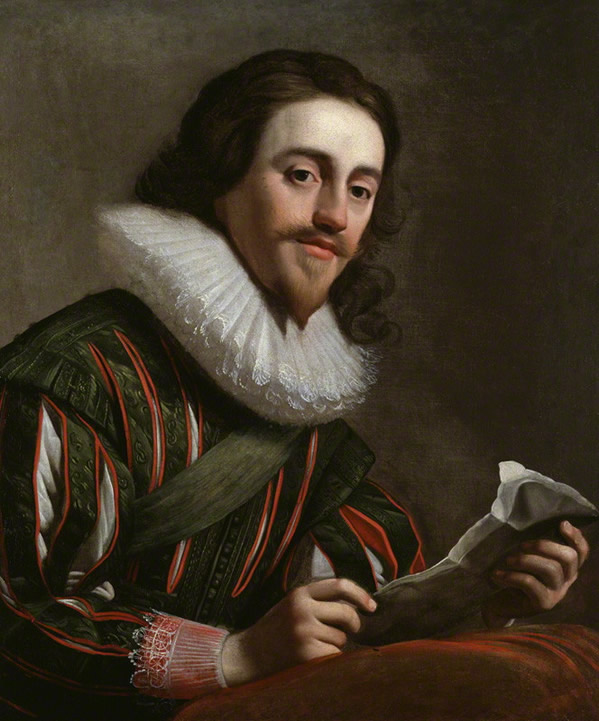
Portrait by Gerrit van Honthorst, 1628

A poorly conceived and executed naval expedition against Spain under Buckingham's leadership went badly, and the House of Commons began proceedings for the impeachment of the Duke. In May 1626, Charles nominated Buckingham as Chancellor of Cambridge University in a show of support, and had two members who had spoken against Buckingham—Dudley Digges and Sir John Eliot—arrested at the door of the House. The Commons was outraged by the imprisonment of two of their members, and after about a week in custody, both were released. On 12 June 1626, the Commons launched a direct protestation attacking Buckingham, stating, "We protest before your Majesty and the whole world that until this great person be removed from intermeddling with the great affairs of state, we are out of hope of any good success; and do fear that any money we shall or can give will, through his misemployment, be turned rather to the hurt and prejudice of this your kingdom than otherwise, as by lamentable experience we have found those large supplies formerly and lately given." Despite the protests, Charles refused to dismiss his friend, dismissing Parliament instead.

Meanwhile, domestic quarrels between Charles and Henrietta Maria were souring the early years of their marriage. Disputes over her jointure, appointments to her household, and the practice of her religion culminated in the King expelling the vast majority of her French attendants in August 1626. Despite Charles's agreement to provide the French with English ships as a condition of marrying Henrietta Maria, in 1627 he launched an attack on the French coast to defend the Huguenots at La Rochelle. The action, led by Buckingham, was ultimately unsuccessful. Buckingham's failure to protect the Huguenots—and his retreat from Saint-Martin-de-Ré—spurred Louis XIII's siege of La Rochelle and furthered the English Parliament's and people's detestation of the Duke.

Charles provoked further unrest by trying to raise money for the war through a "forced loan": a tax levied without parliamentary consent. In November 1627, the test case in the King's Bench, the "Five Knights' Case", found that the King had a prerogative right to imprison without trial those who refused to pay the forced loan. Summoned again in March 1628, Parliament adopted a Petition of Right on 26 May, calling upon Charles to acknowledge that he could not levy taxes without Parliament's consent, impose martial law on civilians, imprison them without due process, or quarter troops in their homes. Charles assented to the petition on 7 June, but by the end of the month he had prorogued Parliament and reasserted his right to collect customs duties without authorisation from Parliament.

On 23 August 1628, Buckingham was assassinated. Charles was deeply distressed. According to Edward Hyde, 1st Earl of Clarendon, he "threw himself upon his bed, lamenting with much passion and with abundance of tears". He remained grieving in his room for two days. In contrast, the public rejoiced at Buckingham's death, accentuating the gulf between the court and the nation and between the Crown and the Commons. Buckingham's death effectively ended the war with Spain and eliminated his leadership as an issue, but it did not end the conflicts between Charles and Parliament. It did, however, coincide with an improvement in Charles's relationship with his wife, and by November 1628 their old quarrels were at an end. Perhaps Charles's emotional ties were transferred from Buckingham to Henrietta Maria. She became pregnant for the first time, and the bond between them grew stronger. Together, they embodied an image of virtue and family life, and their court became a model of formality and morality.

== Personal rule ==
=== Parliament prorogued ===
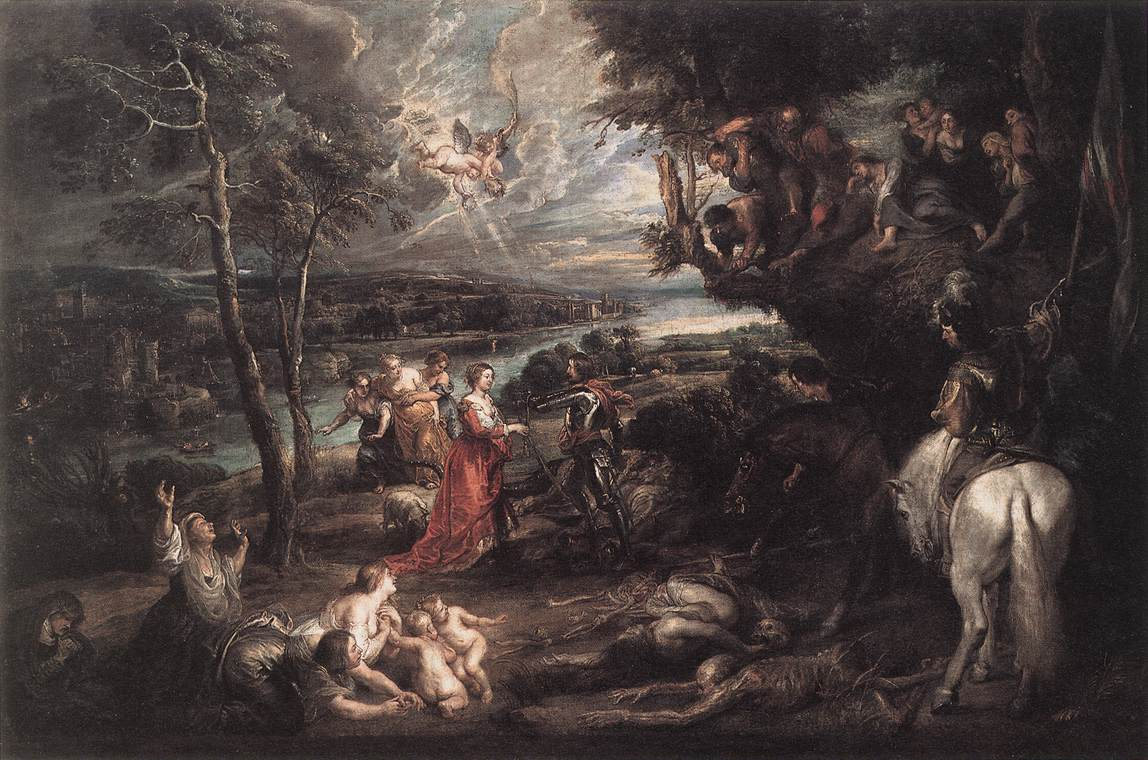
Rubens depicted Charles as a victorious and chivalrous Saint George in an English landscape, 1629–30. (Note: Rubens, who acted as the Spanish representative during peace negotiations in London, painted Landscape with Saint George and the Dragon in 1629–30. The landscape is modelled on the Thames Valley, and the central figures of Saint George (England's patron saint) and a maiden resemble the King and Queen. The dragon of war lies slain under Charles's foot.)

In January 1629, Charles opened the second session of the English Parliament, which had been prorogued in June 1628, with a moderate speech on the tonnage and poundage issue. Members of the House of Commons began to voice opposition to Charles's policies in light of the case of John Rolle, a Member of Parliament whose goods had been confiscated for failing to pay tonnage and poundage. Many MPs viewed the imposition of the tax as a breach of the Petition of Right. When Charles ordered a parliamentary adjournment on 2 March, members held the Speaker, Sir John Finch, down in his chair so that the session could be prolonged long enough for resolutions against Catholicism, Arminianism, and tonnage and poundage to be read out and acclaimed by the chamber. This was too much for Charles, who dissolved Parliament and had nine parliamentary leaders, including Sir John Eliot, imprisoned over the matter, thereby turning the men into martyrs and giving popular cause to their protest.

Personal rule necessitated peace. Without the means in the foreseeable future to raise funds from Parliament for a European war, or Buckingham's help, Charles made peace with France and Spain. The next 11 years, during which Charles ruled England without a Parliament, are known as the Personal Rule or the "eleven years' tyranny". Ruling without Parliament was not exceptional, and was supported by precedent. (Note: For example, James I ruled without Parliament between 1614 and 1621.) But only Parliament could legally raise taxes, and without it Charles's capacity to acquire funds for his treasury was limited to his customary rights and prerogatives.

=== Finances ===
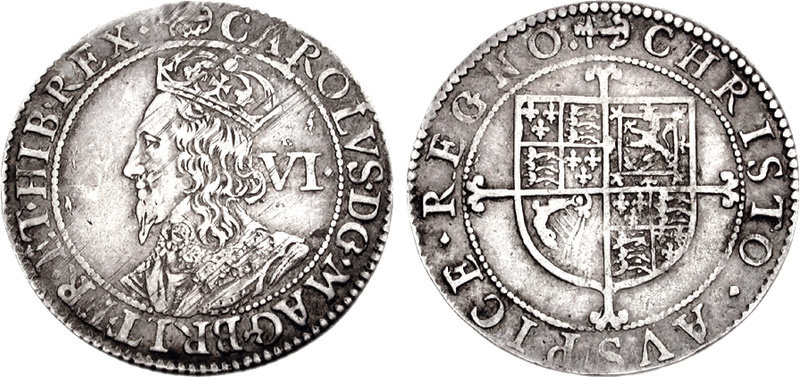
Sixpence of Charles I, inscribed: CAROLUS D(EI) G(RATIA) MAG(NAE) BRIT(ANNIAE) FR(ANCIAE) ET HIB(ERNIAE) REX ("Charles, by the grace of God, King of Great Britain, of France and of Ireland")

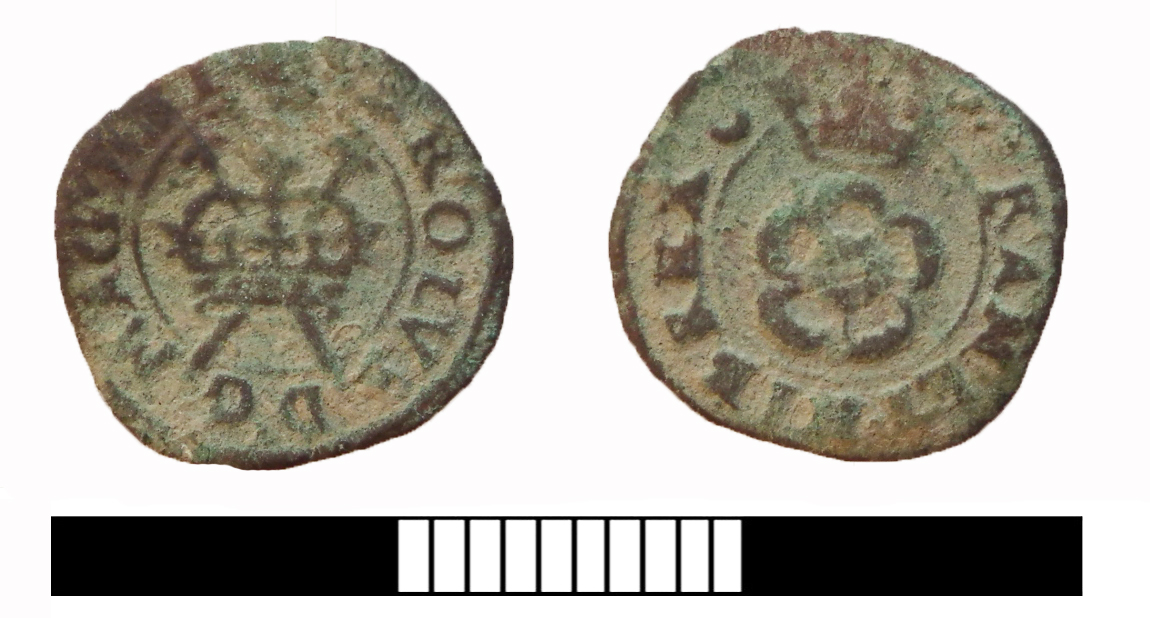
Farthing of Charles I, showing a crown over two sceptres in saltire on the obverse. The two sceptres represent the two kingdoms of England and Scotland.

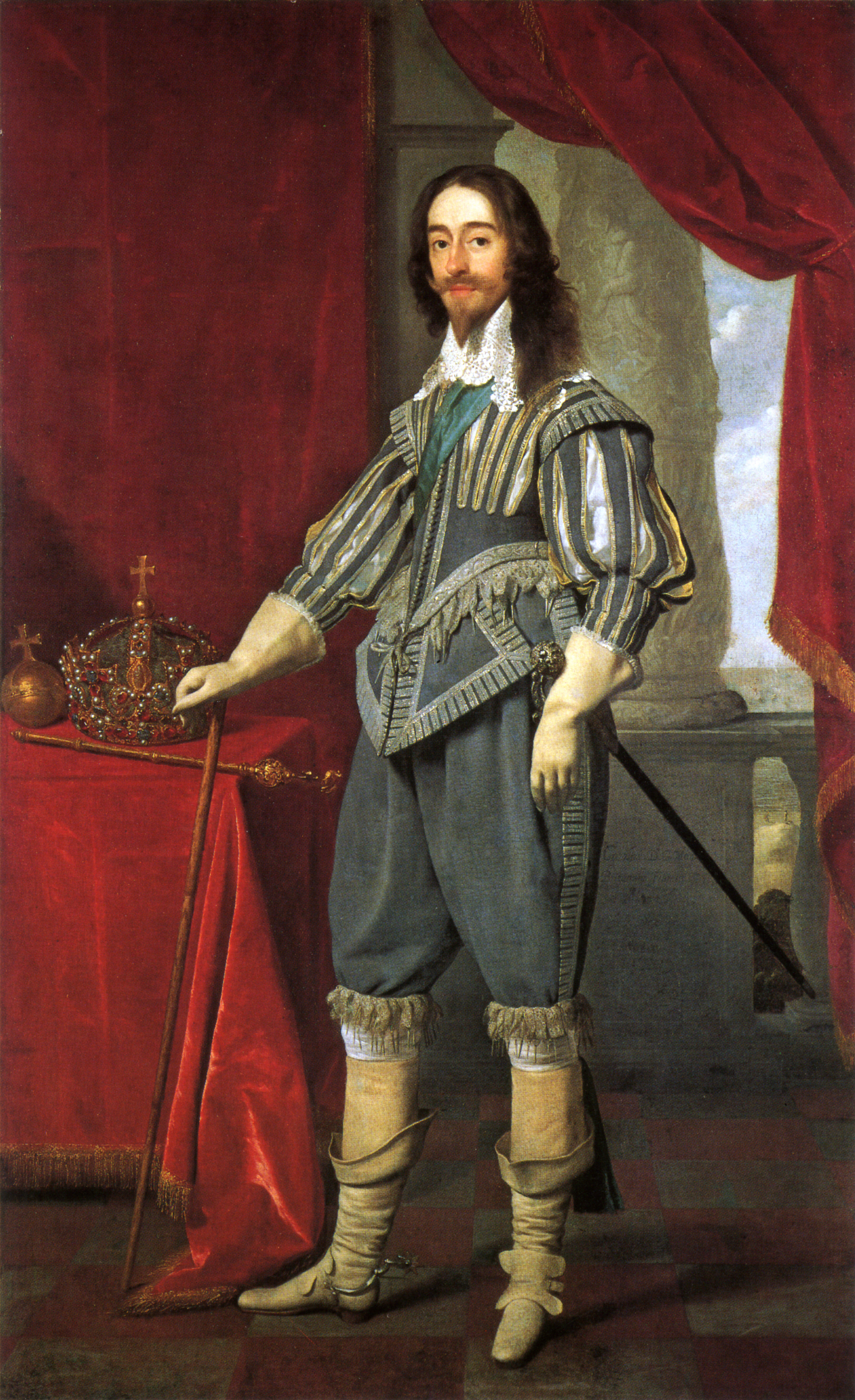
Charles with paned sleeves, by Daniel Mytens c. 1631.

A large fiscal deficit had arisen during the reigns of Elizabeth I and James I. Notwithstanding Buckingham's short-lived campaigns against both Spain and France, Charles had little financial capacity to wage wars overseas. Throughout his reign, he was obliged to rely primarily on volunteer forces for defence and on diplomatic efforts to support his sister Elizabeth and his foreign policy objective for the restoration of the Palatinate. England was still the least taxed country in Europe, with no official excise and no regular direct taxation. To raise revenue without reconvening Parliament, Charles resurrected an all-but-forgotten law called the "Distraint of Knighthood", in abeyance for over a century, which required any man who earned £40 or more from land each year to present himself at the king's coronation to be knighted. Relying on this old statute, Charles fined those who had failed to attend his coronation in 1626. (Note: For comparison, a typical farm labourer could earn 8d a day, or about £10 a year.)

The chief tax Charles imposed was a feudal levy known as ship money, which proved even more unpopular, and lucrative, than tonnage and poundage. Previously, collection of ship money had been authorised only during wars, and only on coastal regions. But Charles argued that there was no legal bar to collecting the tax for defence during peacetime and throughout the kingdom. Ship money, paid directly to the Treasury of the Navy, provided between £150,000 to £200,000 annually between 1634 and 1638, after which yields declined. Opposition to ship money steadily grew, but England's 12 common law judges ruled the tax within the King's prerogative, though some had reservations. The prosecution of John Hampden for non-payment in 1637–38 provided a platform for popular protest, and the judges found against Hampden only by the narrow margin of 7–5.

Charles also derived money by granting monopolies, despite a statute forbidding such action, which, though inefficient, raised an estimated £100,000 a year in the late 1630s. (Note: The statute forbade grants of monopolies to individuals but Charles circumvented the restriction by granting monopolies to companies.) One such monopoly was for soap, pejoratively called "popish soap" because some of its backers were Catholics. Charles also raised funds from the Scottish nobility, at the price of considerable acrimony, by the Act of Revocation (1625), whereby all gifts of royal or church land made to the nobility since 1540 were revoked, with continued ownership being subject to an annual rent. In addition, the boundaries of the royal forests in England were restored to their ancient limits as part of a scheme to maximise income by exploiting the land and fining land users within the reasserted boundaries for encroachment. The programme's focus was disafforestation and sale of forest lands for conversion to pasture and arable farming, or in the case of the Forest of Dean, development for the iron industry. Disafforestation frequently caused riots and disturbances, including those known as the Western Rising.

Against the background of this unrest, Charles faced bankruptcy in mid-1640. The City of London, preoccupied with its own grievances, refused to make any loans to him, as did foreign powers. In this extremity, in July Charles seized silver bullion worth £130,000 held in trust at the mint in the Tower of London, promising its later return at 8% interest to its owners. In August, after the East India Company refused to grant a loan, Lord Cottington seized the company's stock of pepper and spices and sold it for £60,000 (far below its market value), promising to refund the money with interest later.

== Religious conflicts ==
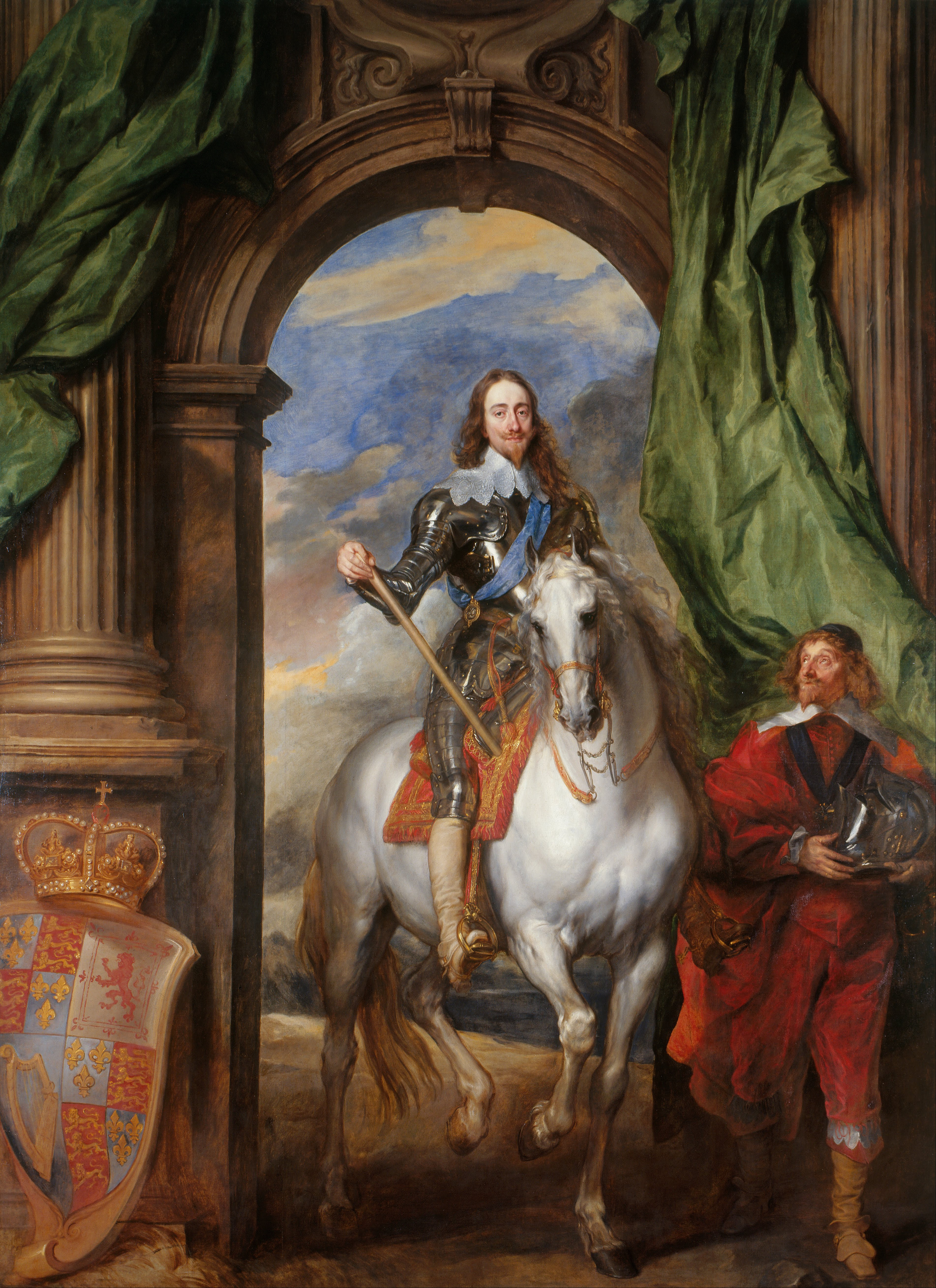
Charles I with M. de St Antoine by Anthony van Dyck, 1633

Throughout Charles's reign, the English Reformation was in the forefront of political debate. Arminian theology emphasised clerical authority and the individual's ability to reject or accept salvation, which opponents viewed as heretical and a potential vehicle for the reintroduction of Catholicism. Puritan reformers considered Charles too sympathetic to Arminianism, (Note: Their hostility was summarised in 1641 by Francis Rous, "For Arminianism is the span of a Papist, and if you mark it well, you shall see an Arminian reaching to a Papist, a Papist to a Jesuit, a Jesuit to the Pope, and the other to the King of Spain. And having kindled fire in our neighbours, they now seek to set on flame this kingdom also.") and opposed his desire to move the Church of England in a more traditional and sacramental direction. In addition, his Protestant subjects followed the European war closely and grew increasingly dismayed by Charles's diplomacy with Spain and his failure to support the Protestant cause abroad effectively.

In 1633, Charles appointed William Laud Archbishop of Canterbury. They initiated a series of reforms to promote religious uniformity by restricting non-conformist preachers, insisting the liturgy be celebrated as prescribed by the Book of Common Prayer, organising the internal architecture of English churches to emphasise the sacrament of the altar, and reissuing King James's Declaration of Sports, which permitted secular activities on the sabbath. The Feoffees for Impropriations, an organisation that bought benefices and advowsons so that Puritans could be appointed to them, was dissolved. Laud prosecuted those who opposed his reforms in the Court of High Commission and the Star Chamber, the two most powerful courts in the land. The courts became feared for their censorship of opposing religious views and unpopular among the propertied classes for inflicting degrading punishments on gentlemen. For example, in 1637 William Prynne, Henry Burton and John Bastwick were pilloried, whipped and mutilated by cropping and imprisoned indefinitely for publishing anti-episcopal pamphlets.

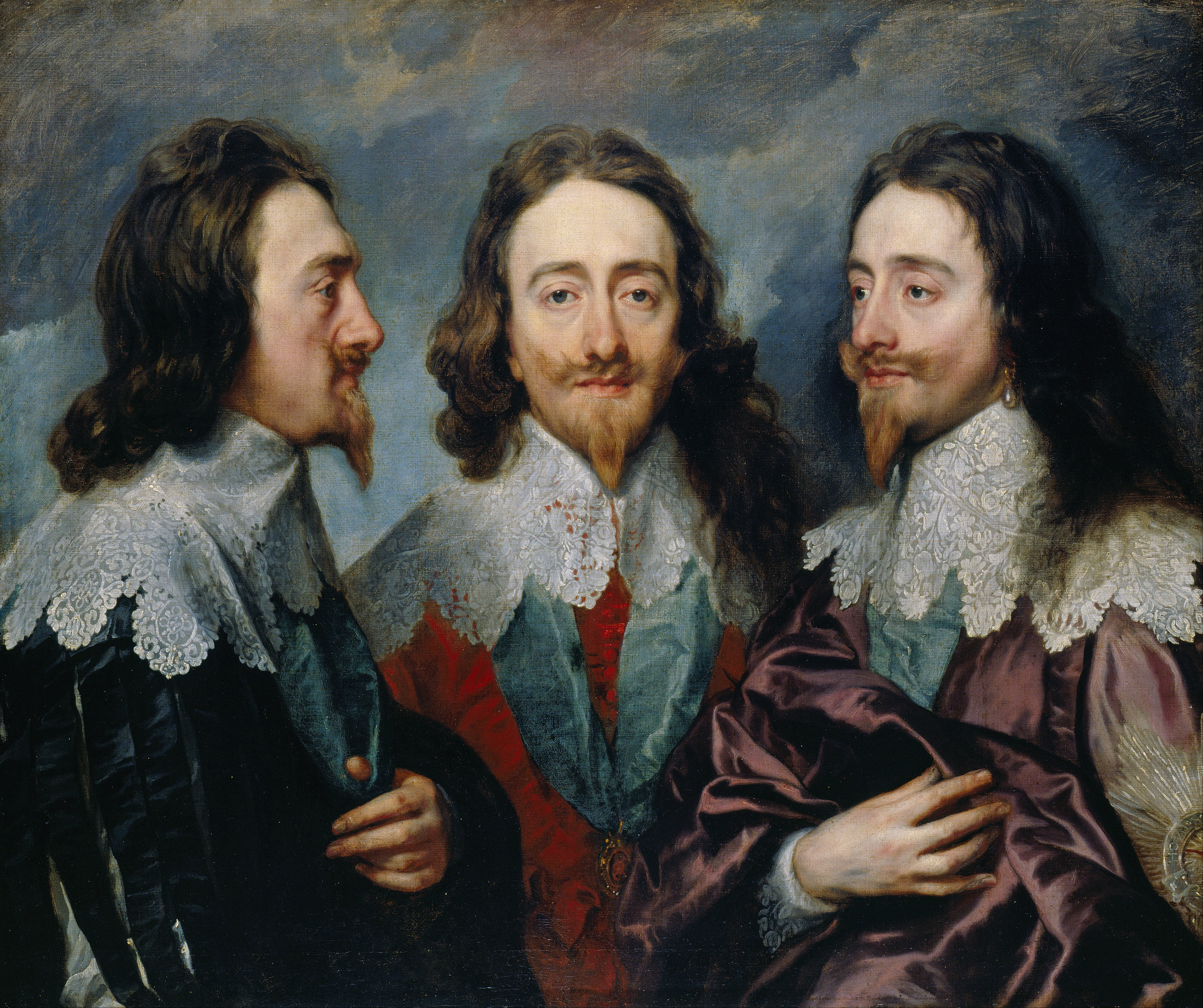
Charles I in Three Positions by van Dyck, 1635–36 (Note: The picture was originally painted for the sculptor Gian Lorenzo Bernini, who used it to carve a bust of the King, destroyed by fire in 1698; on seeing the painting, Bernini allegedly remarked the sitter was the saddest person he had ever seen and was destined for a violent death.)

When Charles attempted to impose his religious policies in Scotland he faced numerous difficulties. Although born in Scotland, Charles had become estranged from it; his first visit since early childhood was for his Scottish coronation in 1633. To the dismay of the Scots, who had removed many traditional rituals from their liturgical practice, Charles insisted that the coronation be conducted using the Anglican rite. In 1637, he ordered the use of a new prayer book in Scotland that was almost identical to the English Book of Common Prayer, without consulting either the Scottish Parliament or the Kirk. Although it had been written, under Charles's direction, by Scottish bishops, many Scots resisted it, seeing it as a vehicle to introduce Anglicanism to Scotland. On 23 July, riots erupted in Edinburgh on the first Sunday of the prayer book's usage, and unrest spread throughout the Kirk. The public began to mobilise around a reaffirmation of the National Covenant, whose signatories pledged to uphold the reformed religion of Scotland and reject any innovations not authorised by Kirk and Parliament. When the General Assembly of the Church of Scotland met in November 1638, it condemned the new prayer book, abolished episcopal church government, and adopted presbyterian government by elders and deacons.

=== Bishops' Wars ===
Charles perceived the unrest in Scotland as a rebellion against his authority, precipitating the First Bishops' War in 1639. He did not seek subsidies from the English Parliament to wage war, instead raising an army without parliamentary aid and marching to Berwick-upon-Tweed, on the Scottish border. The army did not engage the Covenanters, as the King feared the defeat of his forces, whom he believed to be significantly outnumbered by the Scots. In the Treaty of Berwick, Charles regained custody of his Scottish fortresses and secured the dissolution of the Covenanters' interim government, albeit at the decisive concession that both the Scottish Parliament and General Assembly of the Scottish Church were called.

The military failure in the First Bishops' War caused a financial and diplomatic crisis for Charles that deepened when his efforts to raise funds from Spain while simultaneously continuing his support for his Palatine relatives led to the public humiliation of the Battle of the Downs, where the Dutch destroyed a Spanish bullion fleet off the coast of Kent in sight of the impotent English navy.

Charles continued peace negotiations with the Scots in a bid to gain time before launching a new military campaign. Because of his financial weakness, he was forced to call Parliament into session in an attempt to raise funds for such a venture. Both the English and Irish parliaments were summoned in the early months of 1640. In March 1640, the Irish Parliament duly voted in a subsidy of £180,000 with the promise to raise an army 9,000 strong by the end of May. But in the English general election in March, court candidates fared badly, and Charles's dealings with the English Parliament in April quickly reached stalemate. The earls of Northumberland and Strafford attempted to broker a compromise whereby the King would agree to forfeit ship money in exchange for £650,000 (although the cost of the coming war was estimated at £1 million). Nevertheless, this alone was insufficient to produce consensus in the Commons. The Parliamentarians' calls for further reforms were ignored by Charles, who still retained the support of the House of Lords. Despite the protests of the Earl of Northumberland, the Short Parliament (as it came to be known) was dissolved in May 1640, less than a month after it assembled.

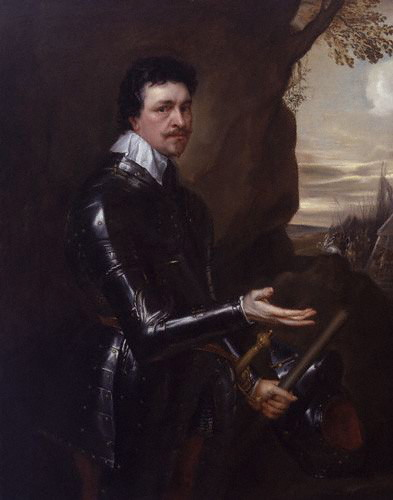
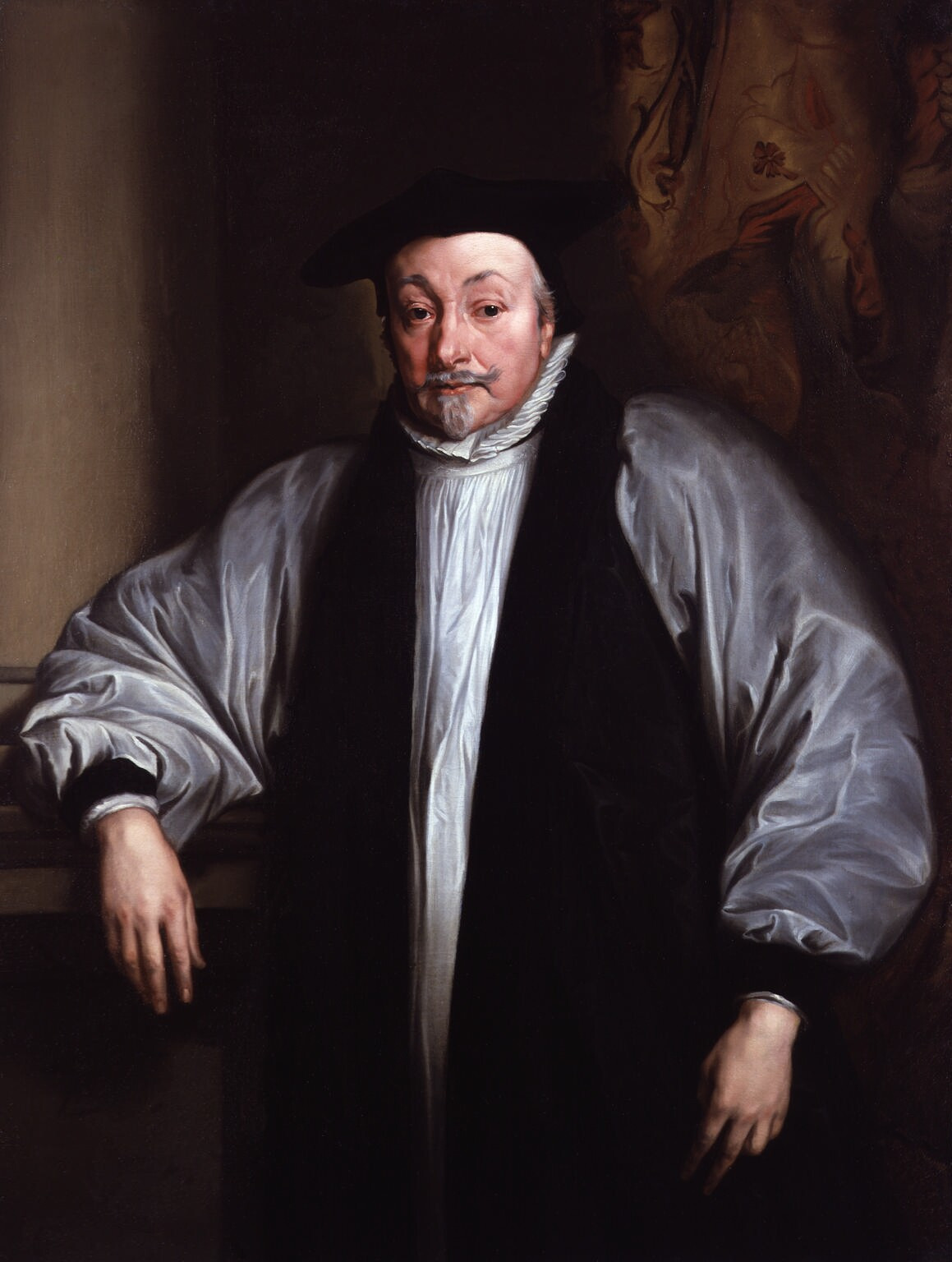
The Earl of Strafford (left) and William Laud (right): two of Charles's most influential advisors during the Personal Rule

By this stage the Earl of Strafford, Lord Deputy of Ireland since 1632, had emerged as Charles's right-hand man and, together with Archbishop Laud, pursued a policy that he termed "Thorough", which aimed to make central royal authority more efficient and effective at the expense of local or anti-government interests. Although originally a critic of the King, Strafford defected to royal service in 1628, in part due to the Duke of Buckingham's persuasion, and had since emerged, alongside Laud, as the most influential of Charles's ministers.

Bolstered by the failure of the English Short Parliament, the Scottish Parliament declared itself capable of governing without the King's consent, and in August 1640 the Covenanter army moved into the English county of Northumberland. Following the illness of Lord Northumberland, who was the King's commander-in-chief, Charles and Strafford went north to command the English forces, despite Strafford being ill himself with a combination of gout and dysentery. The Scottish soldiery, many of whom were veterans of the Thirty Years' War, had far greater morale and training than their English counterparts. They met virtually no resistance until reaching Newcastle upon Tyne, where they defeated the English forces at the Battle of Newburn and occupied the city, as well as the neighbouring County Palatine of Durham.

As demands for a parliament grew, Charles took the unusual step of summoning a great council of peers. By the time it met, on 24 September at York, Charles had resolved to follow the almost universal advice to call a parliament. After informing the peers that a parliament would convene in November, he asked them to consider how he could acquire funds to maintain his army against the Scots in the meantime. They recommended making peace. A cessation of arms was negotiated in the humiliating Treaty of Ripon, signed in October 1640. This stated that the Scots would continue to occupy Northumberland and Durham and be paid £850 per day indefinitely until a final settlement was negotiated and the English Parliament recalled, which would be required to raise sufficient funds to pay the Scottish forces. Consequently, Charles summoned what later became known as the Long Parliament. Once again, his supporters fared badly at the polls. Of the 493 members of the Commons returned in November, more than 350 opposed the King.

== Long Parliament ==
=== Tensions escalate ===
The Long Parliament proved just as difficult for Charles as had the Short Parliament. It assembled on 3 November 1640 and quickly began proceedings to impeach the King's leading counsellors for high treason. Strafford was taken into custody on 10 November; Laud was impeached on 18 December; Finch, now Lord Keeper of the Great Seal, was impeached the next day, and fled to The Hague with Charles's permission on 21 December. To prevent the King from dissolving it at will, Parliament passed the Triennial Act 1640 (16 Cha. 1. c. 1), which required Parliament to be summoned at least every three years, and permitted the Lord Keeper and 12 peers to summon Parliament if the King failed to do so. The Act was coupled with a subsidy bill, and to secure the latter, Charles grudgingly granted royal assent in February 1641.

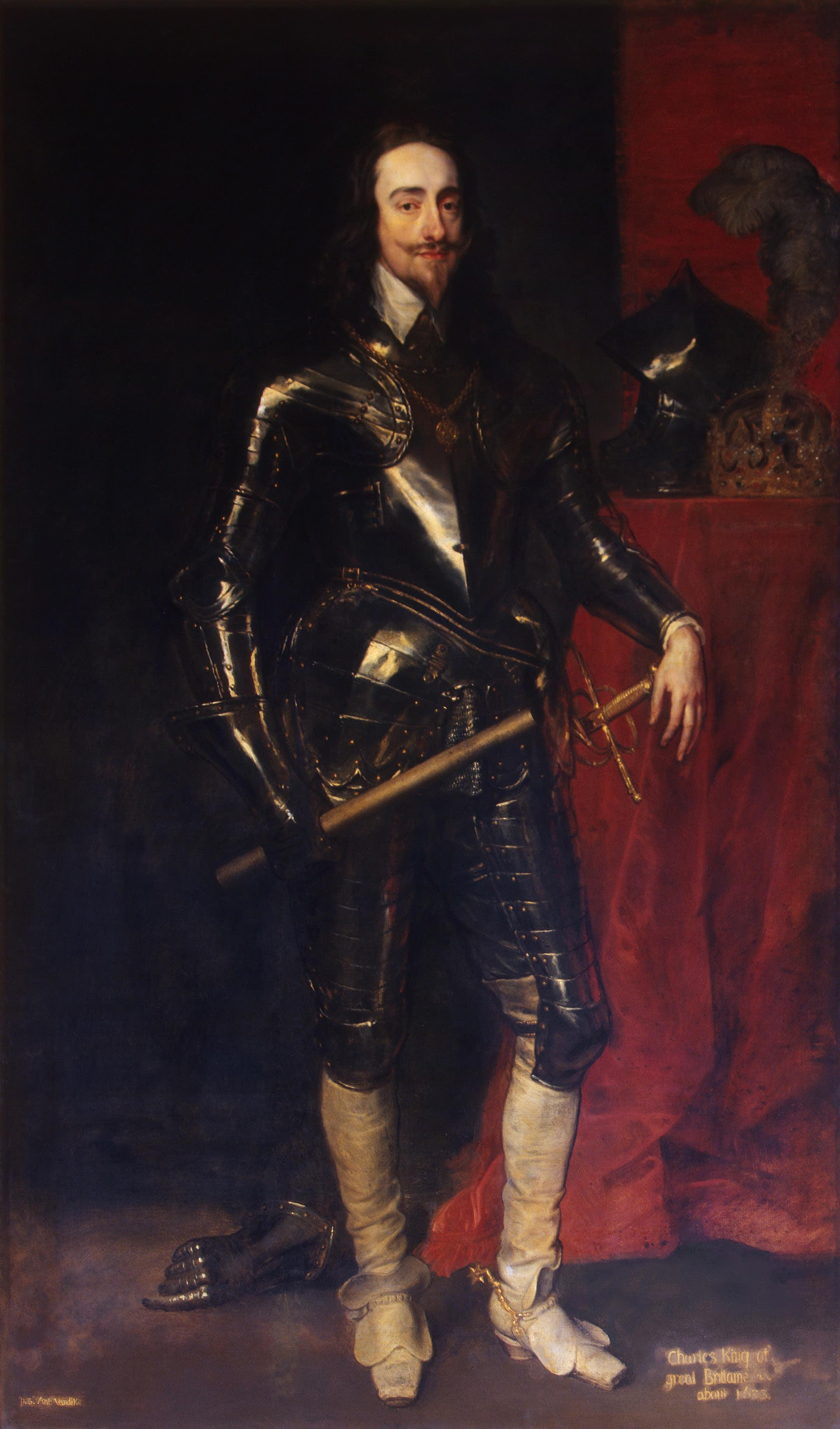
Portrait of Charles in armour, by van Dyck and his workshop, 1638

Strafford had become the principal target of the Parliamentarians, particularly John Pym, and he went on trial for high treason on 22 March 1641. But Sir Henry Vane's key allegation that Strafford had threatened to use the Irish army to subdue England was not corroborated, and on 10 April Pym's case collapsed. Pym and his allies immediately launched a bill of attainder, which simply declared Strafford guilty and pronounced the sentence of death.

Charles assured Strafford that "upon the word of a king you shall not suffer in life, honour or fortune", and the attainder could not succeed if Charles withheld assent. Furthermore, many members and most peers opposed the attainder, not wishing, in the words of one, to "commit murder with the sword of justice". But increased tensions and an attempted coup by royalist army officers in support of Strafford and in which Charles was involved began to sway the issue. The Commons passed the bill on 20 April by a large margin (204 in favour, 59 opposed, and 230 abstained), and the Lords acquiesced (by 26 votes to 19, with 79 absent) in May. On 3 May, Parliament's Protestation attacked the "wicked counsels" of Charles's "arbitrary and tyrannical government". While those who signed the petition undertook to defend the King's "person, honour and estate", they also swore to preserve "the true reformed religion", Parliament, and the "rights and liberties of the subjects". Fearing for his family's safety in the face of unrest, Charles reluctantly assented to Strafford's attainder on 9 May after consulting his judges and bishops. Strafford was beheaded three days later.

Also in early May, Charles assented to an unprecedented Act that forbade the dissolution of the English Parliament without its consent. In the following months, ship money, fines in distraint of knighthood and excise without parliamentary consent were declared unlawful, and the Courts of Star Chamber and High Commission were abolished. All remaining forms of taxation were legalised and regulated by the Tonnage and Poundage Act. The House of Commons also launched bills attacking bishops and episcopacy, but these failed in the Lords.

Charles had made important concessions in England, and temporarily improved his position in Scotland by signing a final settlement of the Bishops' Wars, then securing the Scots' favour on a visit from August to November 1641 during which he conceded to the official establishment of presbyterianism in Scotland. But after an attempted royalist coup in Scotland, known as the Incident, Charles's credibility was significantly undermined.

=== Irish rebellion ===
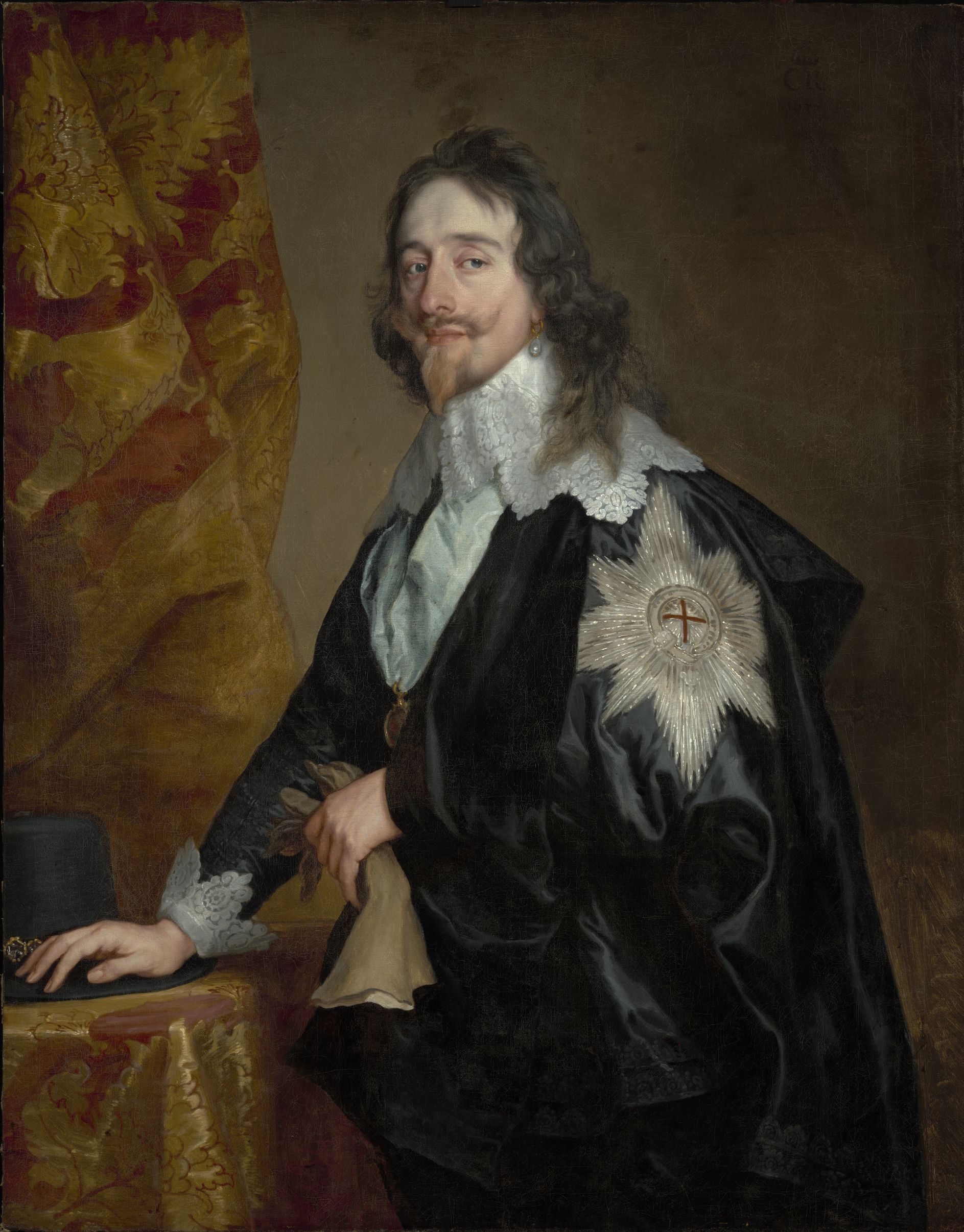
Charles wearing the Order of the Garter, by van Dyck, c. 1637

Ireland's population was split into three main sociopolitical groups: the Gaelic Irish, who were Catholic; the Old English, who were descended from medieval Normans and also predominantly Catholic; and the New English, who were Protestant settlers from England and Scotland aligned with the English Parliament and the Covenanters. Strafford's administration had improved the Irish economy and boosted tax revenue, but had done so by heavy-handedly imposing order. He had trained up a large Catholic army in support of the King and weakened the Irish Parliament's authority, while continuing to confiscate land from Catholics for Protestant settlement at the same time as promoting a Laudian Anglicanism that was anathema to Presbyterians. As a result, all three groups had become disaffected. Strafford's impeachment provided a new departure for Irish politics whereby all sides joined to present evidence against him. In a similar manner to the English Parliament, the Old English members of the Irish Parliament argued that while opposed to Strafford they remained loyal to Charles. They argued that the King had been led astray by malign counsellors, and that, moreover, a viceroy such as Strafford could emerge as a despotic figure instead of ensuring that the King was directly involved in governance.

Strafford's fall from power weakened Charles's influence in Ireland. The dissolution of the Irish army was unsuccessfully demanded three times by the English Commons during Strafford's imprisonment, until lack of money eventually forced Charles to disband the army at the end of Strafford's trial. Disputes over the transfer of land ownership from native Catholic to settler Protestant, particularly in relation to the plantation of Ulster, coupled with resentment at moves to ensure the Irish Parliament was subordinate to the Parliament of England, sowed the seeds of rebellion. When armed conflict arose between the Gaelic Irish and New English in late October 1641, the Old English sided with the Gaelic Irish while simultaneously professing their loyalty to the King.

In November 1641, the House of Commons passed the Grand Remonstrance, a long list of grievances against actions by Charles's ministers committed since the beginning of his reign (that were asserted to be part of a grand Catholic conspiracy of which the King was an unwitting member), but it was in many ways a step too far by Pym and passed by only 11 votes, 159 to 148. Furthermore, the Remonstrance had very little support in the House of Lords, which the Remonstrance attacked. The tension was heightened by news of the Irish rebellion, coupled with inaccurate rumours of Charles's complicity. Throughout November, a series of alarmist pamphlets published stories of atrocities in Ireland, including massacres of New English settlers by the native Irish who could not be controlled by the Old English lords. Rumours of "papist" conspiracies circulated in England, and English anti-Catholic opinion was strengthened, damaging Charles's reputation and authority. The English Parliament distrusted Charles's motivations when he called for funds to put down the Irish rebellion; many members of the Commons suspected that forces he raised might later be used against Parliament itself. Pym's Militia Bill was intended to wrest control of the army from the King, but it did not have the support of the Lords, let alone Charles. Instead, the Commons passed the bill as an ordinance, which they claimed did not require royal assent. The Militia Ordinance appears to have prompted more members of the Lords to support the King. In an attempt to strengthen his position, Charles generated great antipathy in London, which was already fast falling into lawlessness, when he placed the Tower of London under the command of Colonel Thomas Lunsford, an infamous, albeit efficient, career officer. When rumours reached Charles that Parliament intended to impeach his wife for supposedly conspiring with the Irish rebels, he decided to take drastic action.

=== Five members ===
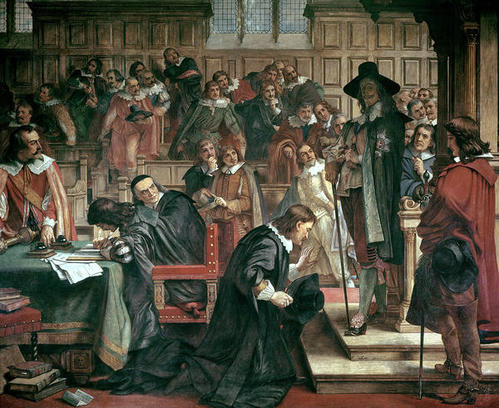
Charles attempts to arrest the Five Members, January 1642; a Victorian re-imagining by Charles West Cope

Charles suspected, probably correctly, that some members of the English Parliament had colluded with the invading Scots. On 3 January 1642, Charles directed Parliament to give up five specific members of the Commons—Pym, John Hampden, Denzil Holles, William Strode and Sir Arthur Haselrig—and one peer, Lord Mandeville, on the grounds of high treason. When Parliament refused, it was possibly Henrietta Maria who persuaded Charles to arrest the five members by force, which he resolved to do personally. But news of the warrant reached Parliament ahead of him, and the wanted men slipped away by boat shortly before Charles entered the House of Commons with an armed guard on 4 January. Having displaced Speaker William Lenthall from his chair, the King asked him where the MPs had fled. Lenthall, on his knees, famously replied, "May it please your Majesty, I have neither eyes to see nor tongue to speak in this place but as the House is pleased to direct me, whose servant I am here." Charles abjectly declared "all my birds have flown", and was forced to retire empty-handed.

The botched arrest attempt was politically disastrous for Charles. No English sovereign had ever entered the House of Commons, and his unprecedented invasion of the chamber to arrest its members was considered a grave breach of parliamentary privilege. In one stroke Charles destroyed his supporters' efforts to portray him as a defence against innovation and disorder.

Parliament quickly seized London, and Charles fled the capital for Hampton Court Palace on 10 January, moving two days later to Windsor Castle. After sending his wife and eldest daughter to safety abroad in February, he travelled northwards, hoping to seize the military arsenal at Hull. To his dismay, he was rebuffed by the town's Parliamentary governor, Sir John Hotham, who refused him entry in April, and Charles was forced to withdraw.

== English Civil War ==
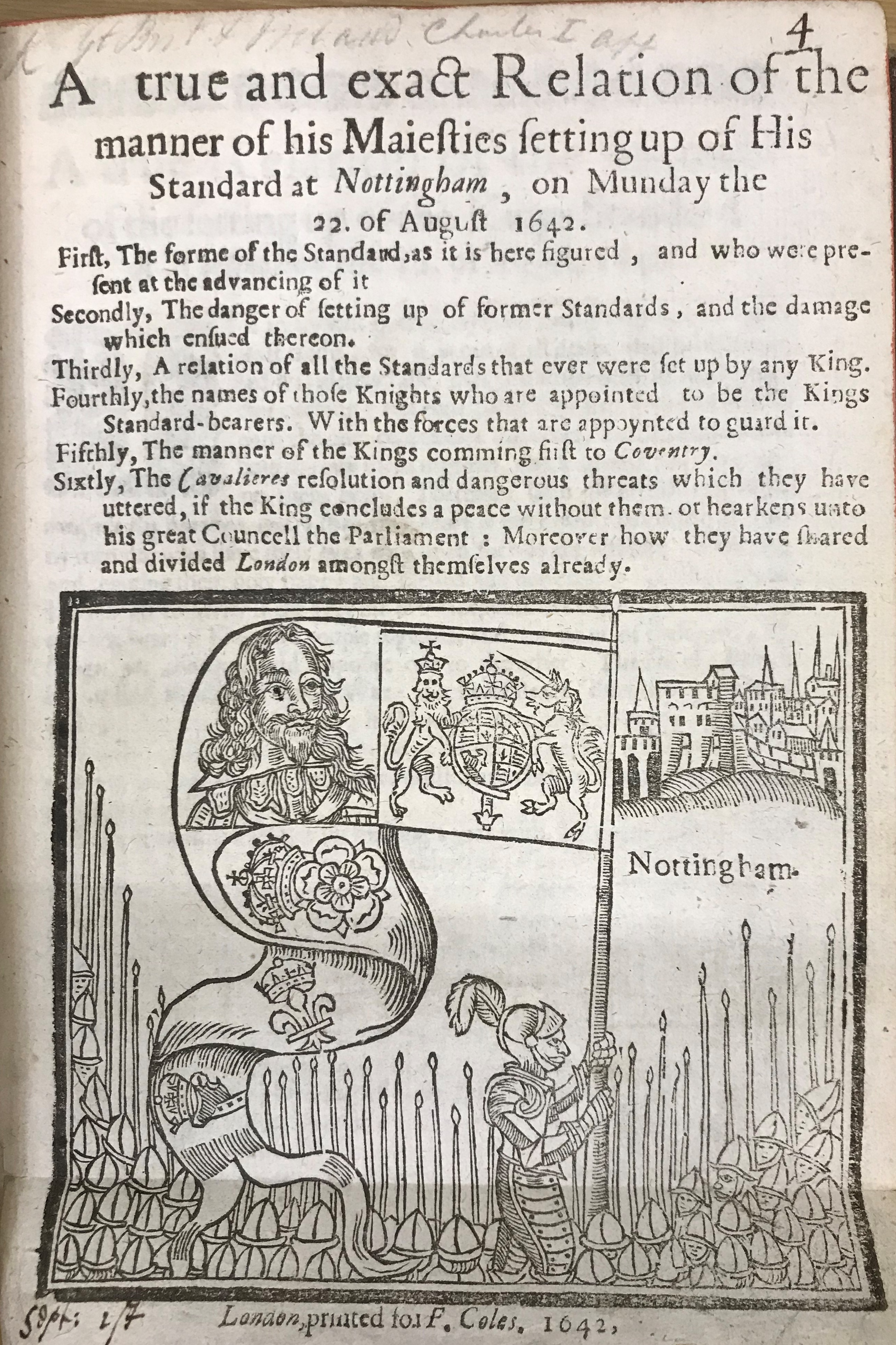
Parliamentarian pamphlet depicting Charles raising the royal standard at Nottingham on 22 August 1642

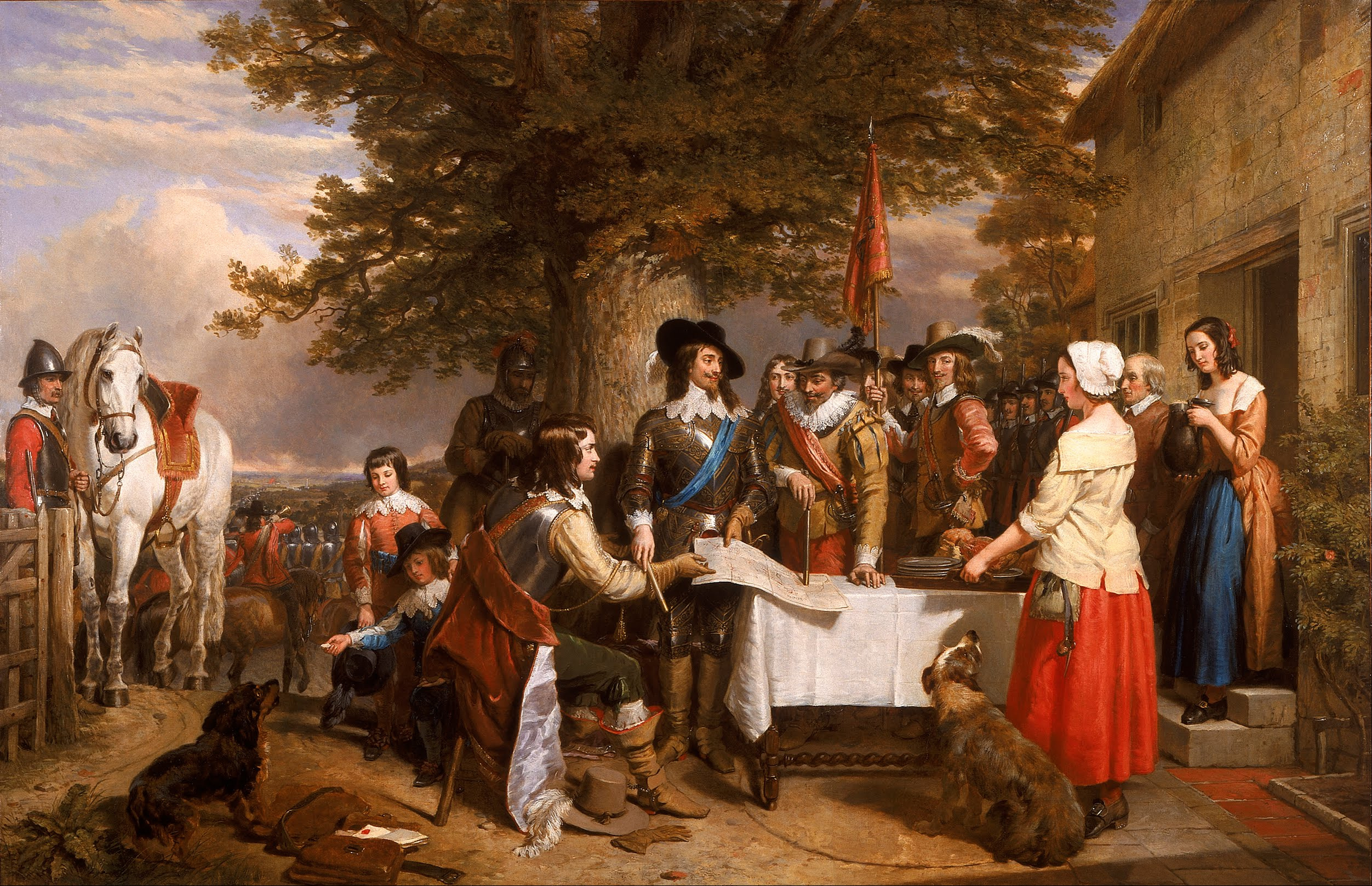
The Eve of the Battle of Edgehill by Charles Landseer, painted in 1845, depicts Charles (centre in blue sash) before the battle of Edgehill, 1642.

In mid-1642, both sides began to arm. Charles raised an army using the medieval method of commission of array, and Parliament called for volunteers for its militia. The negotiations proved futile, and Charles raised the royal standard in Nottingham on 22 August 1642. By then, his forces controlled roughly the Midlands, Wales, the West Country and northern England. He set up his court at Oxford. Parliament controlled London, the south-east and East Anglia, as well as the English navy.

After a few skirmishes, the opposing forces met in earnest at Edgehill, on 23 October 1642. Charles's nephew Prince Rupert of the Rhine disagreed with the battle strategy of the royalist commander Robert Bertie, 1st Earl of Lindsey, and Charles sided with Rupert. Lindsey resigned, leaving Charles to assume overall command assisted by Patrick Ruthven, 1st Earl of Forth. Rupert's cavalry successfully charged through the parliamentary ranks, but instead of swiftly returning to the field, rode off to plunder the parliamentary baggage train. Lindsey, acting as a colonel, was wounded and bled to death without medical attention. The battle ended inconclusively as the daylight faded.

In his own words, the experience of battle had left Charles "exceedingly and deeply grieved". He regrouped at Oxford, turning down Rupert's suggestion of an immediate attack on London. After a week, he set out for the capital on 3 November, capturing Brentford on the way while simultaneously continuing to negotiate with civic and parliamentary delegations. At Turnham Green on the outskirts of London, the royalist army met resistance from the city militia, and faced with a numerically superior force, Charles ordered a retreat. He overwintered in Oxford, strengthening the city's defences and preparing for the next season's campaign. Peace talks between the two sides collapsed in April.

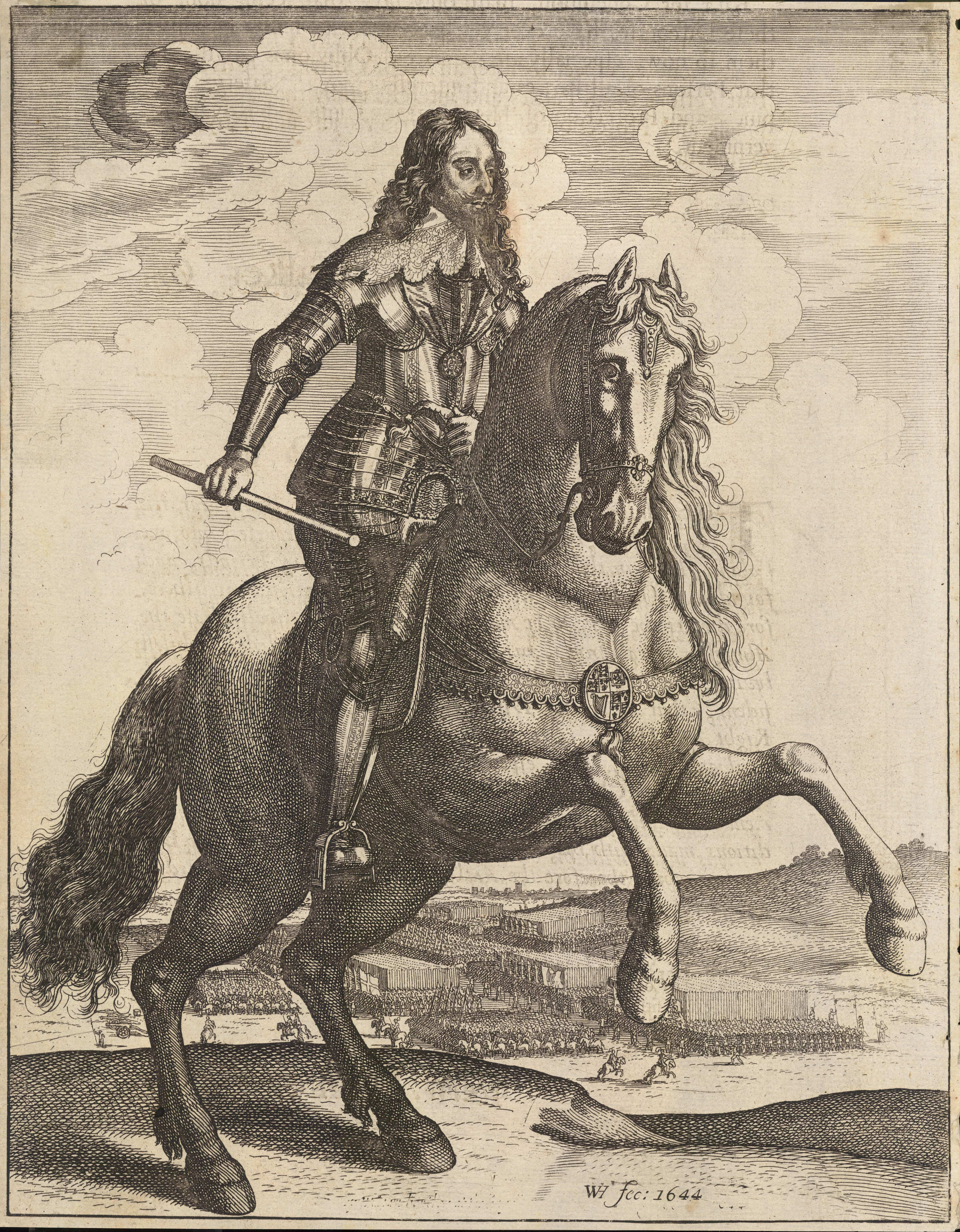
Charles depicted by Wenceslaus Hollar on horseback in front of his troops, 1644

The war continued indecisively over the next couple of years, and Henrietta Maria returned to Britain for 17 months from February 1643. After Rupert captured Bristol in July 1643, Charles visited the port city and laid siege to Gloucester, further up the river Severn. His plan to undermine the city walls failed due to heavy rain, and on the approach of a parliamentary relief force, Charles lifted the siege and withdrew to Sudeley Castle. The parliamentary army turned back towards London, and Charles set off in pursuit. The two armies met at Newbury, Berkshire, on 20 September. Just as at Edgehill, the battle stalemated at nightfall, and the armies disengaged. In January 1644, Charles summoned a Parliament at Oxford, which was attended by about 40 peers and 118 members of the Commons; all told, the Oxford Parliament, which sat until March 1645, was supported by the majority of peers and about a third of the Commons. Charles became disillusioned by the assembly's ineffectiveness, calling it a "mongrel" in private letters to his wife.

In 1644, Charles remained in the southern half of England while Rupert rode north to relieve Newark and York, which were under threat from parliamentary and Scottish Covenanter armies. Charles was victorious at the Battle of Cropredy Bridge in late June, but the royalists in the north were defeated at the Battle of Marston Moor just a few days later. The King continued his campaign in the south, encircling and disarming the parliamentary army of Robert Devereux, 3rd Earl of Essex. Returning northwards to his base at Oxford, he fought at Newbury for a second time before the winter closed in; the battle ended indecisively. Attempts to negotiate a settlement over the winter, while both sides rearmed and reorganised, were again unsuccessful.

At the Battle of Naseby on 14 June 1645, Rupert's horsemen again mounted a successful charge against the flank of Parliament's New Model Army, but elsewhere on the field, opposing forces pushed Charles's troops back. Attempting to rally his men, Charles rode forward, but as he did so, Robert Dalzell, 1st Earl of Carnwath seized his bridle and pulled him back, fearing for the King's safety. The royalist soldiers misinterpreted Carnwath's action as a signal to move back, leading to a collapse of their position. The military balance tipped decisively in Parliament's favour. There followed a series of defeats for the royalists, and then the siege of Oxford, from which Charles escaped (disguised as a servant) in April 1646. He put himself into the hands of the Scottish Presbyterian army besieging Newark, and was taken northwards to Newcastle upon Tyne. After nine months of negotiations, the Scots finally arrived at an agreement with the English Parliament: in exchange for £100,000, and the promise of more money in the future, (Note: The Scots were promised £400,000 in instalments.) the Scots withdrew from Newcastle and delivered Charles to the parliamentary commissioners in January 1647.

=== Captivity ===
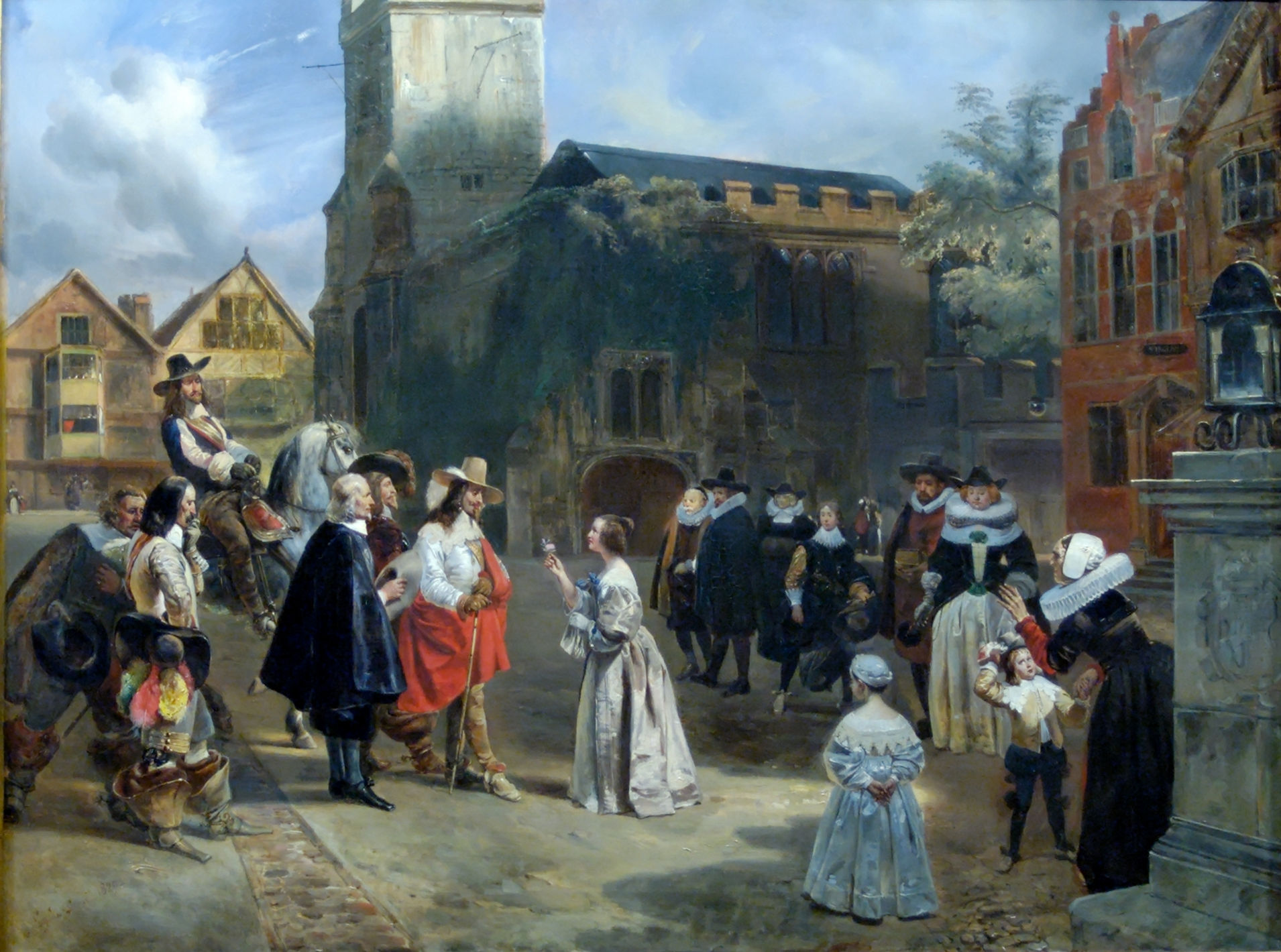
Charles at Carisbrooke Castle by Eugène Lami, 1829

Parliament held Charles under house arrest at Holdenby House in Northamptonshire until Cornet George Joyce took him by threat of force from Holdenby on 3 June in the name of the New Model Army. By this time, mutual suspicion had developed between Parliament, which favoured army disbandment and presbyterianism, and the New Model Army, which was primarily officered by congregationalist Independents, who sought a greater political role. Charles was eager to exploit the widening divisions, and apparently viewed Joyce's actions as an opportunity rather than a threat. He was taken first to Newmarket, at his own suggestion, and then transferred to Oatlands and subsequently Hampton Court, while more fruitless negotiations took place. By November, he determined that it would be in his best interests to escape—perhaps to France, Southern England or Berwick-upon-Tweed, near the Scottish border. He fled Hampton Court on 11 November, and from the shores of Southampton Water made contact with Colonel Robert Hammond, Parliamentary Governor of the Isle of Wight, whom he apparently believed to be sympathetic. But Hammond confined Charles in Carisbrooke Castle and informed Parliament that Charles was in his custody.

From Carisbrooke, Charles continued to try to bargain with the various parties. In direct contrast to his previous conflict with the Scottish Kirk, on 26 December 1647 he signed a secret treaty with the Scots. Under the agreement, called the "Engagement", the Scots undertook to invade England on Charles's behalf and restore him to the throne on condition that Presbyterianism be established in England for three years.

The royalists rose in May 1648, igniting the Second Civil War, and as agreed with Charles, the Scots invaded England. Uprisings in Kent, Essex, and Cumberland, and a rebellion in South Wales, were put down by the New Model Army, and with the defeat of the Scots at the Battle of Preston in August 1648, the royalists lost any chance of winning the war.

Charles's only recourse was to return to negotiations, which were held at Newport on the Isle of Wight. On 5 December 1648, Parliament voted 129 to 83 to continue negotiating with the King, but Oliver Cromwell and the army opposed any further talks with someone they viewed as a bloody tyrant and were already taking action to consolidate their power. Hammond was replaced as Governor of the Isle of Wight on 27 November, and placed in the custody of the army the following day. In Pride's Purge on 6 and 7 December, the members of Parliament out of sympathy with the military were arrested or excluded by Colonel Thomas Pride, while others stayed away voluntarily. The remaining members formed the Rump Parliament. It was for all practical purposes a military coup.

== Trial ==
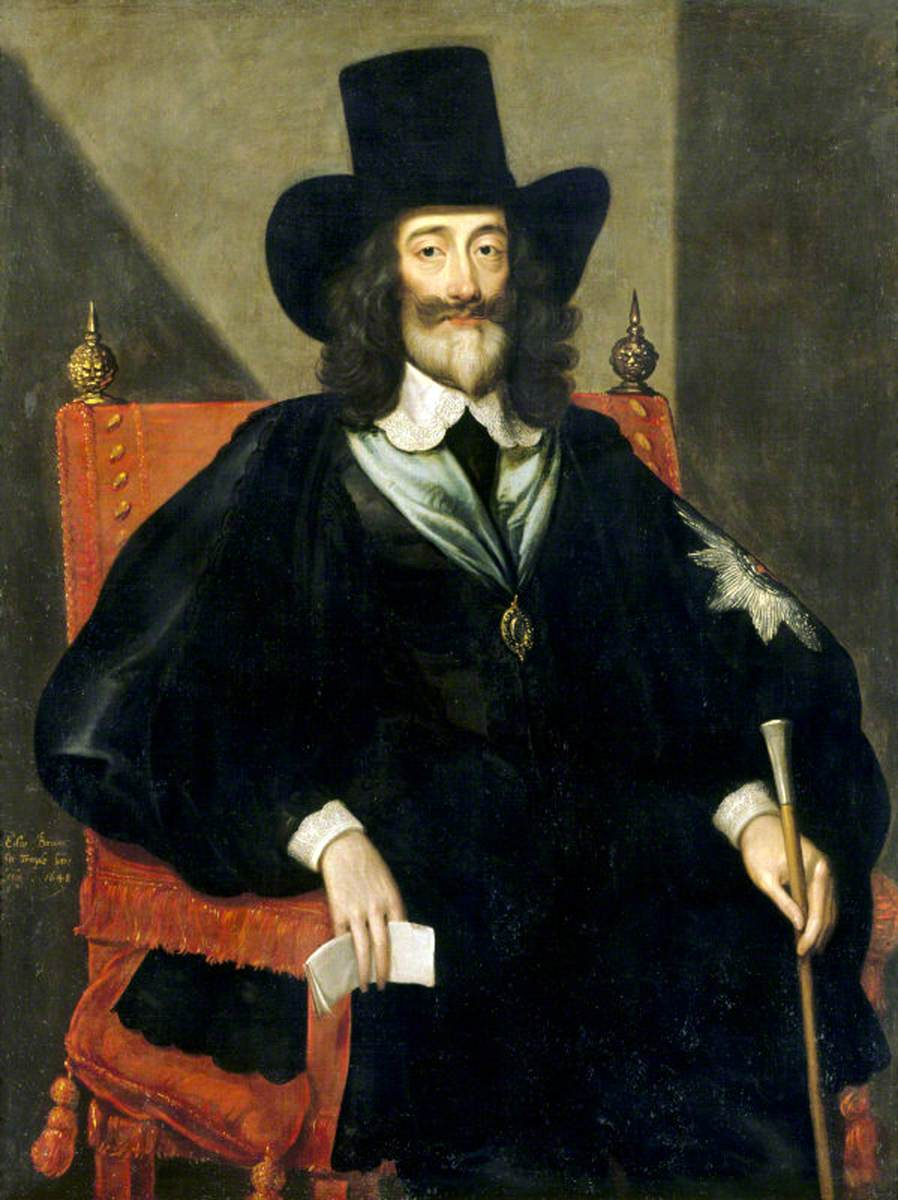
Charles at his trial, by Edward Bower, 1649. He let his beard and hair grow long because Parliament had dismissed his barber, and he refused to let anyone else near him with a razor.

Charles was moved to Hurst Castle at the end of 1648, and thereafter to Windsor Castle. In January 1649, the Rump Parliament House of Commons indicted him for treason; however, the House of Lords rejected the charge. The idea of trying a king was novel. The Chief Justices of the three common law courts of England—Henry Rolle, Oliver St John and John Wilde—all opposed the indictment as unlawful.

The Rump Commons declared itself capable of legislating alone, passed a bill creating a separate court for Charles's trial, and declared the bill an act without the need for royal assent. The High Court of Justice established by the Act consisted of 135 commissioners, but many either refused to serve or chose to stay away. Only 68 (all firm Parliamentarians) attended Charles's trial on charges of high treason and "other high crimes" that began on 20 January 1649 in Westminster Hall. John Bradshaw acted as President of the Court, and the prosecution was led by Solicitor General John Cook.

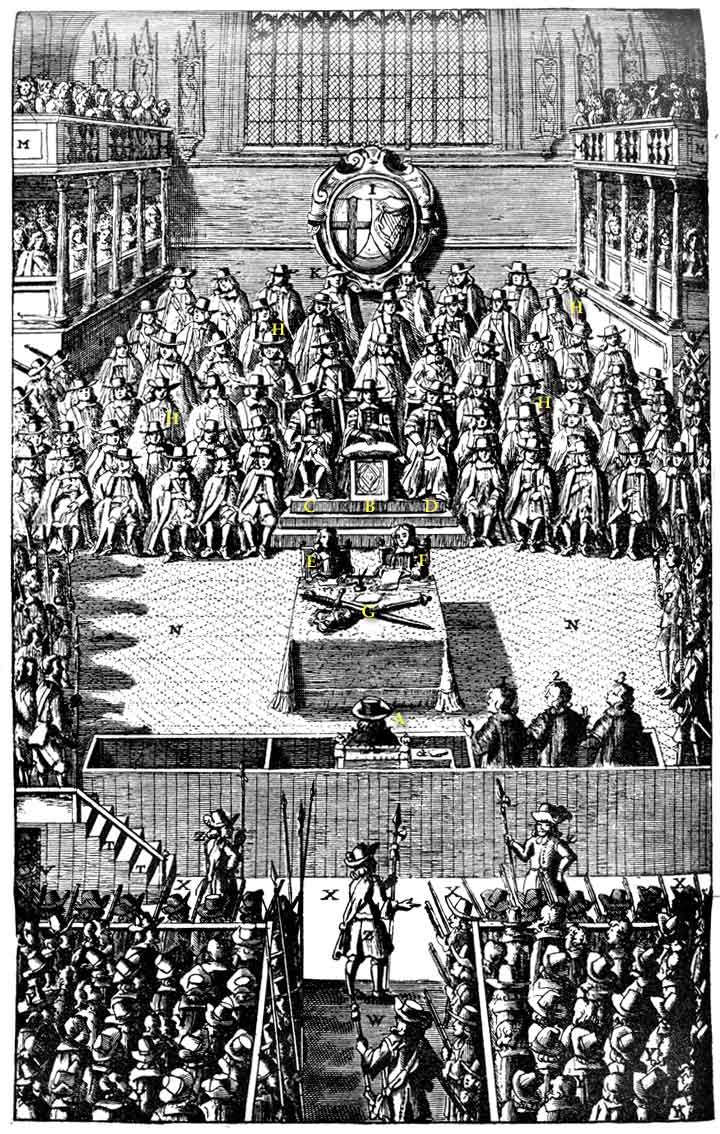
Charles (in the dock with his back to the viewer) facing the High Court of Justice, 1649

Charles was accused of treason against England by using his power to pursue his personal interest rather than the good of the country. The charge stated that he was devising "a wicked design to erect and uphold in himself an unlimited and tyrannical power to rule according to his will, and to overthrow the rights and liberties of the people". In carrying this out he had "traitorously and maliciously levied war against the present Parliament, and the people therein represented", and that the "wicked designs, wars, and evil practices of him, the said Charles Stuart, have been, and are carried on for the advancement and upholding of a personal interest of will, power, and pretended prerogative to himself and his family, against the public interest, common right, liberty, justice, and peace of the people of this nation."

Presaging the modern concept of command responsibility, the indictment held him "guilty of all the treasons, murders, rapines, burnings, spoils, desolations, damages and mischiefs to this nation, acted and committed in the said wars, or occasioned thereby." An estimated 300,000 people, or 6% of the population, died during the war.

Over the first three days of the trial, whenever Charles was asked to plead, he refused, stating his objection with the words: "I would know by what power I am called hither, by what lawful authority...?" He claimed that no court had jurisdiction over a monarch, that his own authority to rule had been given to him by God and by the traditional laws of England, and that the power wielded by those trying him was only that of force of arms. Charles insisted that the trial was illegal, explaining that,

no earthly power can justly call me (who am your King) in question as a delinquent ... this day's proceeding cannot be warranted by God's laws; for, on the contrary, the authority of obedience unto Kings is clearly warranted, and strictly commanded in both the Old and New Testament ... for the law of this land, I am no less confident, that no learned lawyer will affirm that an impeachment can lie against the King, they all going in his name: and one of their maxims is, that the King can do no wrong ... the higher House is totally excluded; and for the House of Commons, it is too well known that the major part of them are detained or deterred from sitting ... the arms I took up were only to defend the fundamental laws of this kingdom against those who have supposed my power hath totally changed the ancient government.

The court, by contrast, challenged the doctrine of sovereign immunity and proposed that "the King of England was not a person, but an office whose every occupant was entrusted with a limited power to govern 'by and according to the laws of the land and not otherwise'."

At the end of the third day, Charles was removed from the court, which then heard more than 30 witnesses against him in his absence over the next two days, and on 26 January condemned him to death. The next day, the King was brought before a public session of the commission, declared guilty, and sentenced. The judgement read, "For all which treasons and crimes this court doth adjudge that he, the said Charles Stuart, as a tyrant, traitor, murderer, and public enemy to the good people of this nation, shall be put to death by the severing of his head from his body." Fifty-nine of the commissioners signed Charles's death warrant.

== Execution ==
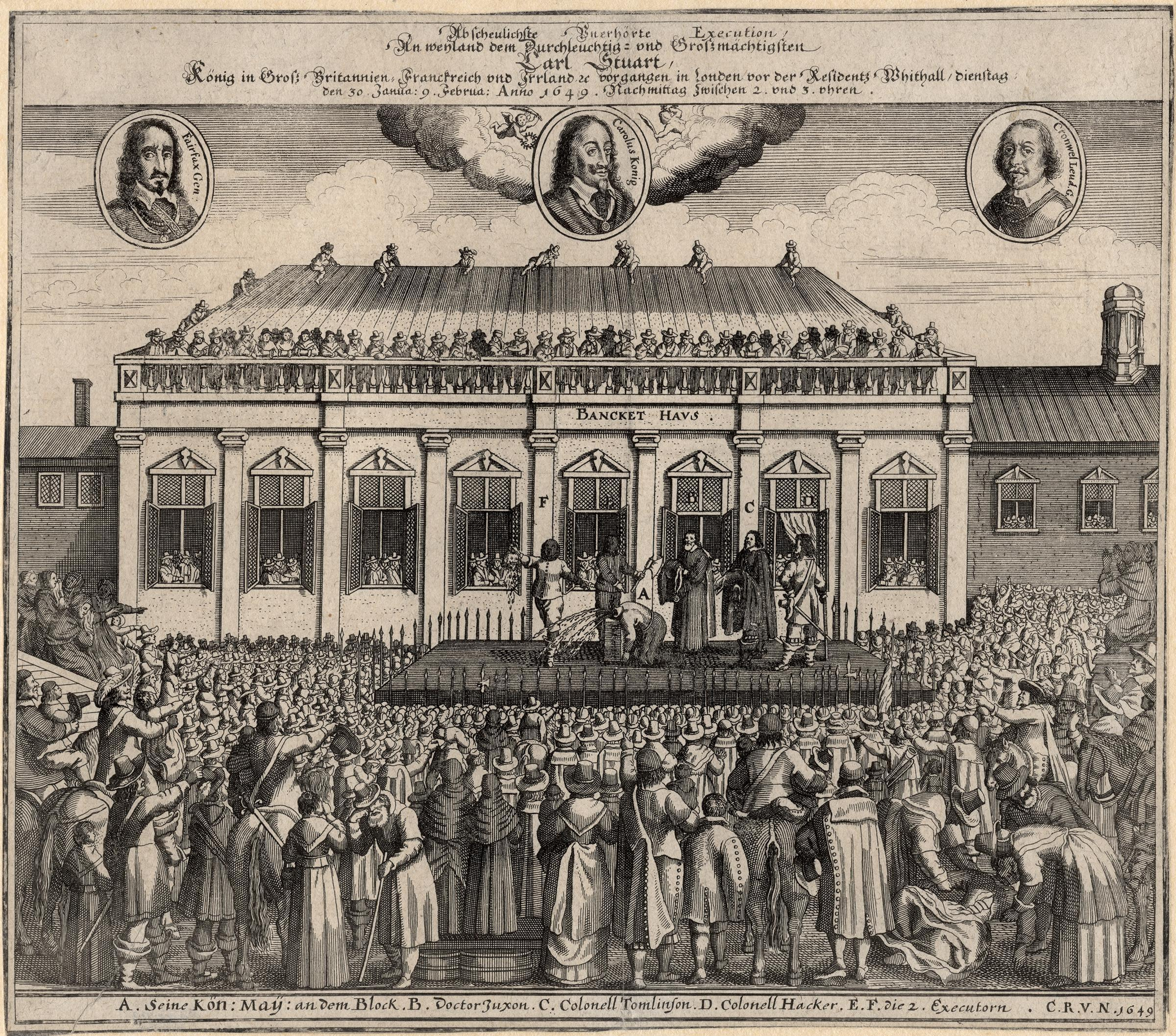
Contemporary German print of Charles I's beheading outside the Banqueting House, Whitehall

Charles's execution was scheduled for 30 January 1649. Two of his children remained in England under the control of the Parliamentarians: Elizabeth and Henry. They were permitted to visit him on 29 January, and he bade them a tearful farewell. The next morning, he called for two shirts to prevent the cold weather causing any noticeable shivers that the crowd could have mistaken for fear: "the season is so sharp as probably may make me shake, which some observers may imagine proceeds from fear. I would have no such imputation."

He walked under guard from St James's Palace, where he had been confined, to the Palace of Whitehall, where an execution scaffold had been erected in front of the Banqueting House. Charles was separated from spectators by large ranks of soldiers, and his last speech reached only those with him on the scaffold. He blamed his fate on his failure to prevent the execution of his loyal servant Strafford: "An unjust sentence that I suffered to take effect, is punished now by an unjust sentence on me." He declared that he had desired the liberty and freedom of the people as much as any, "but I must tell you that their liberty and freedom consists in having government ... It is not their having a share in the government; that is nothing appertaining unto them. A subject and a sovereign are clean different things." He continued, "I shall go from a corruptible to an incorruptible Crown, where no disturbance can be."

At about 2:00 pm, Charles, aged 48, put his head on the block after saying a prayer and signalled the executioner when he was ready by stretching out his hands; he was then beheaded in one clean stroke. According to observer Philip Henry, a moan "as I never heard before and desire I may never hear again" rose from the assembled crowd, some of whom then dipped their handkerchiefs in the King's blood as a memento.

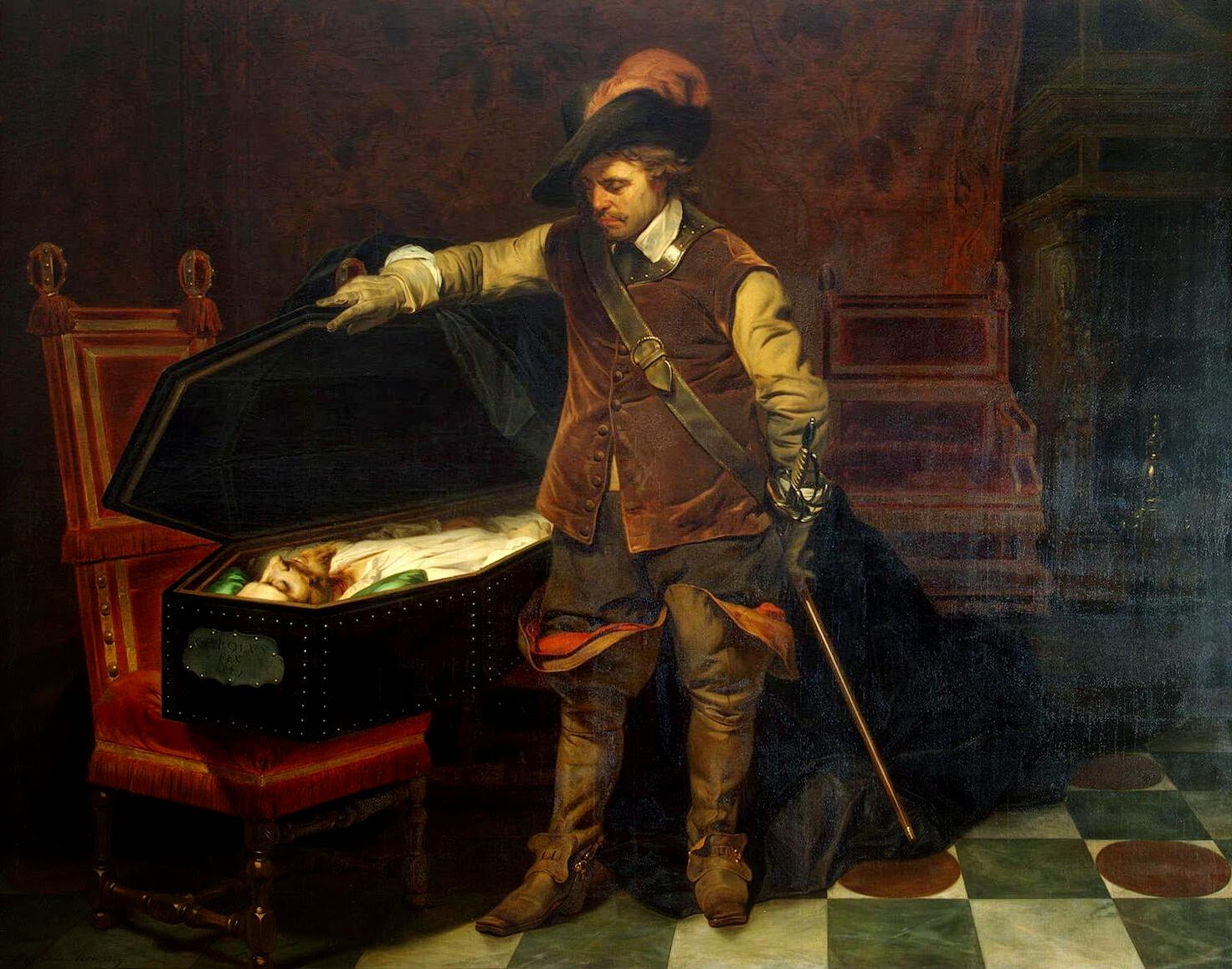
Cromwell was said to have visited Charles's coffin, sighing "Cruel necessity!" as he did so. The story was depicted by Delaroche in the nineteenth century.

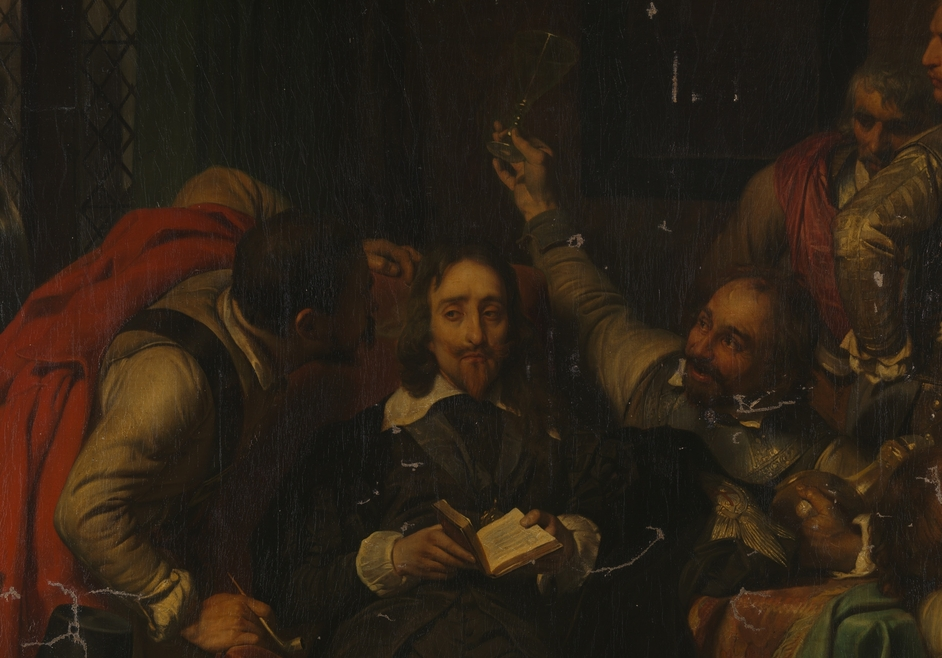
Another of Delaroche's paintings, Charles I Insulted by Cromwell's Soldiers, is an allegory for later events in France and the mocking of Christ.

The executioner was masked and disguised, and there is debate over his identity. The commissioners approached Richard Brandon, the common hangman of London, but he refused, at least at first, despite being offered £200—a considerably large sum for the time. It is possible he relented and undertook the commission after being threatened with death, but others have been named as potential candidates, including George Joyce, William Hulet and Hugh Peters. The clean strike, confirmed by an examination of the King's body at Windsor in 1813, (Note: In 1813, part of Charles's beard, a piece of neck bone, and a tooth were taken as relics. They were placed back in the tomb in 1888.) suggests that the execution was carried out by an experienced headsman.

It was common practice for the severed head of a traitor to be held up and exhibited to the crowd with the words "Behold the head of a traitor!" Charles's head was exhibited, but those words were not used, possibly because the executioner did not want his voice recognised. On the day after the execution, the King's head was sewn back onto his body, which was then embalmed and placed in a lead coffin.

The commission refused to allow Charles's burial at Westminster Abbey, so his body was conveyed to Windsor on the night of 7 February. He was buried in private on 9 February 1649 in the chapel's quire, alongside the coffins of Henry VIII and Henry's third wife, Jane Seymour, in St George's Chapel, Windsor Castle. The King's son, Charles II, later planned for an elaborate royal mausoleum to be erected in Hyde Park, London, but it was never built.

== Legacy ==
Ten days after Charles's execution, on the day of his interment, a memoir purportedly written by him appeared for sale. This book, the Eikon Basilike (Greek for the "Royal Portrait"), contained an apologia for royal policies, and proved an effective piece of royalist propaganda. John Milton wrote a Parliamentary rejoinder, the Eikonoklastes ("The Iconoclast"), but the response made little headway against the pathos of the royalist book. Anglicans and royalists fashioned an image of martyrdom, and in the Convocations of Canterbury and York of 1660 King Charles the Martyr was added to the Church of England's liturgical calendar. High church Anglicans held special services on the anniversary of his death. Churches, such as those at Falmouth and Tunbridge Wells, and Anglican devotional societies such as the Society of King Charles the Martyr, were founded in his honour.

With the monarchy overthrown, England became a republic or "Commonwealth". The House of Lords was abolished by the Rump Commons, and a Council of State assumed executive power. All significant military opposition in Britain and Ireland was extinguished by the forces of Oliver Cromwell in the Anglo-Scottish War and the Cromwellian conquest of Ireland. Cromwell forcibly disbanded the Rump Parliament in 1653, thereby establishing the Protectorate with himself as Lord Protector. Upon his death in 1658, he was briefly succeeded by his ineffective son, Richard. Parliament was reinstated, and the monarchy was restored to Charles I's eldest son, Charles II, in 1660.

Charles's unprecedented 1642 invasion of the House of Commons' chamber, a grave violation of the liberties of Parliament, and his unsuccessful attempt to arrest five Members of Parliament are commemorated annually at the State Opening of Parliament.

=== Art ===
Partly inspired by his visit to the Spanish court in 1623, Charles became a passionate and knowledgeable art collector, amassing one of the finest art collections ever assembled. In Spain, he sat for a sketch by Velázquez, and acquired works by Titian and Correggio, among others. In England, his commissions included the ceiling of the Banqueting House, Whitehall, by Peter Paul Rubens and paintings by other artists from the Low Countries such as Gerard van Honthorst, Daniel Mytens, and Anthony van Dyck. His close associates, including the Duke of Buckingham and Thomas Howard, 21st Earl of Arundel, shared his interest and have been dubbed the Whitehall Group. In 1627 and 1628, Charles purchased the entire collection of the Duke of Mantua, which included work by Titian, Correggio, Raphael, Caravaggio, Andrea del Sarto and Andrea Mantegna. His collection grew further to encompass Gian Lorenzo Bernini, Pieter Bruegel the Elder, Leonardo da Vinci, Hans Holbein the Younger, Wenceslaus Hollar, Tintoretto and Veronese, and self-portraits by both Albrecht Dürer and Rembrandt. By Charles's death, there were an estimated 1,760 paintings, most of which were sold and dispersed by Parliament.

=== Assessments ===
In the words of John Philipps Kenyon, "Charles Stuart is a man of contradictions and controversy". Revered by high Tories who considered him a saintly martyr, he was condemned by Whig historians, such as Samuel Rawson Gardiner, who thought him duplicitous and delusional. In recent decades, most historians have criticised him, the main exception being Kevin Sharpe, who offered a more sympathetic view that has not been widely adopted. Sharpe argued that the King was a dynamic man of conscience, but Barry Coward thought Charles "the most incompetent monarch of England since Henry VI", a view shared by Ronald Hutton, who called him "the worst king we have had since the Middle Ages".

Archbishop William Laud, whom Parliament beheaded during the war, called Charles a "mild and gracious prince who knew not how to be, or how to be made, great." Charles was more sober and refined than his father, but he was intransigent. He deliberately pursued unpopular policies that brought ruin on himself. Both Charles and James were advocates of the divine right of kings, but while James's ambitions concerning absolute prerogative were tempered by compromise and consensus with his subjects, Charles believed he had no need to compromise or even to explain his actions. He thought he was answerable only to God. "Princes are not bound to give account of their actions," he wrote, "but to God alone".

== Titles, styles, honours and arms ==
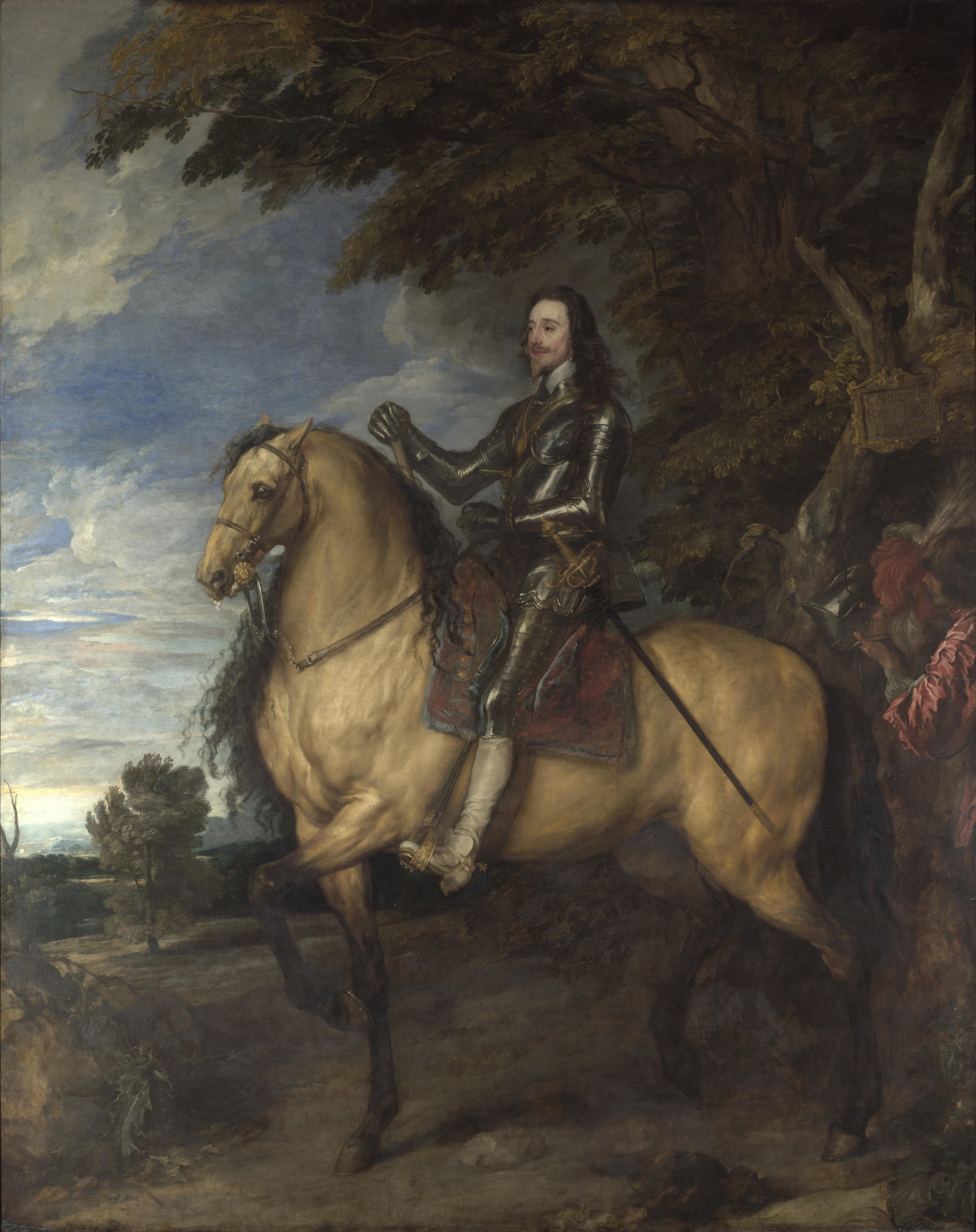
Charles, as painted by Sir Anthony van Dyck between 1637 and 1638

=== Titles and styles ===
- 23 December 1600 – 27 March 1625: Duke of Albany, Marquess of Ormonde, Earl of Ross and Lord Ardmannoch
- 6 January 1605 – 27 March 1625: Duke of York
- 6 November 1612 – 27 March 1625: Duke of Cornwall and Rothesay
- 4 November 1616 – 27 March 1625: Prince of Wales and Earl of Chester
- 27 March 1625 – 30 January 1649: His Majesty The King

The official style of Charles I as king in England was "Charles, by the Grace of God, King of England, Scotland, France and Ireland, Defender of the Faith, etc." The style "of France" was only nominal, and was used by every English monarch from Edward III to George III, regardless of the amount of French territory actually controlled. The authors of his death warrant called him "Charles Stuart, King of England".

=== Honours ===
- KB: Knight of the Bath, 6 January 1605
- KG: Knight of the Garter, 24 April 1611

=== Arms ===
As Duke of York, Charles bore the royal arms of the kingdom differenced by a label Argent of three points, each bearing three torteaux Gules. As the Prince of Wales, he bore the royal arms differenced by a plain label Argent of three points. As king, Charles bore the royal arms undifferenced: Quarterly, I and IV Grandquarterly, Azure three fleurs-de-lis Or (for France) and Gules three lions passant guardant in pale Or (for England); II Or a lion rampant within a tressure flory-counter-flory Gules (for Scotland); III Azure a harp Or stringed Argent (for Ireland). In Scotland, the Scottish arms were placed in the first and fourth quarters with the English and French arms in the second quarter.

Coats of arms of Charles I of England

Coat of arms as Duke of York from 1611 to 1612

Coat of arms as heir apparent and Prince of Wales used from 1612 to 1625

Coat of arms of Charles I used (outside Scotland) from 1625 to 1649

Coat of arms of Charles I used in Scotland from 1625 to 1649

== Issue ==
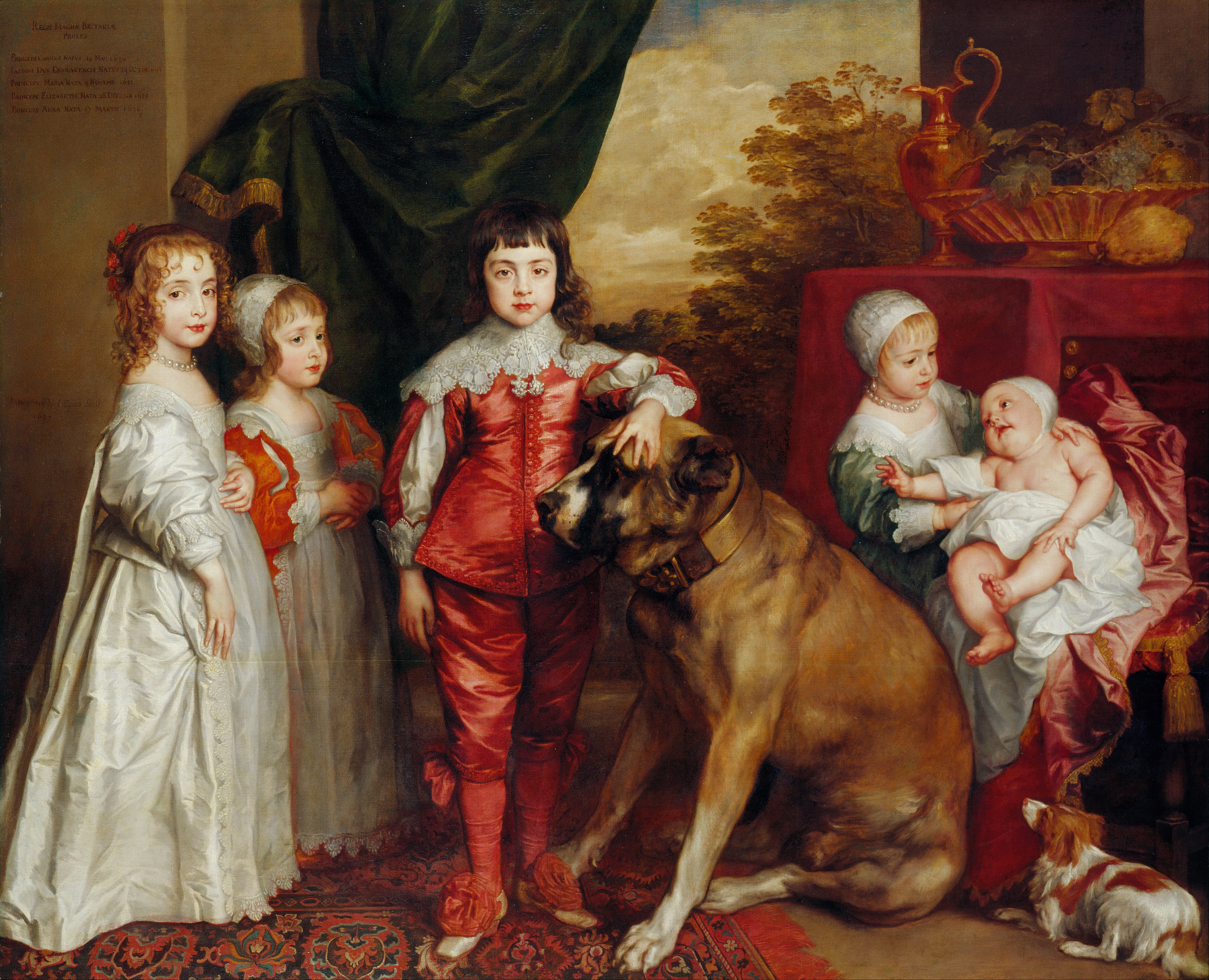
Charles I's five eldest children, 1637. Left to right: Mary, James, Charles, Elizabeth and Anne.

Charles had nine children, five of whom reached adulthood. Two of his sons eventually succeeded as king, and two children died at or shortly after birth.

| Name | Birth | Death | Notes |
|---|---|---|---|
| Charles James, Duke of Cornwall and Rothesay | 13 May 1629 | 13 May 1629 | Born and died the same day. Buried as "Charles, Prince of Wales". |
| Charles II | 29 May 1630 | 6 February 1685 | Married Catherine of Braganza (1638–1705) in 1662. No legitimate liveborn issue, but many acknowledged illegitimate offspring. |
| Mary, Princess Royal | 4 November 1631 | 24 December 1660 | Married William II, Prince of Orange (1626–1650) in 1641. She had one child: William III & II. |
| James II & VII | 14 October 1633 | 6 September 1701 | Married (1) Anne Hyde (1637–1671) in 1659. Had issue including Mary II and Anne, Queen of Great Britain; Married (2) Mary of Modena (1658–1718) in 1673. Had issue. |
| Elizabeth | 29 December 1635 | 8 September 1650 | Died young. |
| Anne | 17 March 1637 | 5 November 1640 | Died young. |
| Catherine | 29 June 1639 | 29 June 1639 | Born and died the same day. |
| Henry, Duke of Gloucester | 8 July 1640 | 13 September 1660 | No issue. |
| Henrietta | 16 June 1644 | 30 June 1670 | Married Philip, Duke of Orléans (1640–1701) in 1661. Had issue. |

== Ancestry ==
Ancestors of Charles I of England

8. Matthew Stewart, Earl of Lennox
4. Henry Stuart, Lord Darnley
9. Margaret Douglas (Note: James V and Margaret Douglas were both children of Margaret Tudor, the daughter of Henry VII of England: James V by James IV of Scotland, Margaret by Archibald Douglas, Earl of Angus.)
2. James I of England (VI of Scotland)
10. James V of Scotland
5. Mary, Queen of Scots
11. Mary of Guise
1. Charles I of England
12. Christian III of Denmark (Note: Christian III and Elizabeth were both children of Frederick I of Denmark: Christian by Anna of Brandenburg, Elizabeth by Sophia of Pomerania.)
6. Frederick II of Denmark
13. Dorothea of Saxe-Lauenburg
3. Anne of Denmark
14. Ulrich III, Duke of Mecklenburg
7. Sophia of Mecklenburg
15. Elizabeth of Denmark

== Notes ==
Charles I of England House of Stuart Born: 19 November 1600 Died: 30 January 1649
Regnal titles
| Preceded by James I & VI | King of England and Ireland; 1625–1649 | Vacant Commonwealth Title next held by Charles II |
| Preceded by James I & VI | King of Scotland; 1625–1649 | Succeeded by Charles II |
British royalty
| Preceded by Henry Frederick | Duke of Cornwall; Duke of Rothesay; 1612–1625 | Vacant Title next held by Charles (II) |
| Preceded by Henry Frederick | Prince of Wales; 1616–1625 | Vacant Title next held by Charles (II) |
