= Kevin Sharpe (historian) =

British historian (1949–2011)

- Born: Kevin M. Sharpe; 26 January 1949
- Died: 5 November 2011 (aged 62)
- Occupations: Historian and academic

Academic background
- Education: St Catherine's College, Oxford

Academic work
- Discipline: History
- Sub-discipline: Early modern Britain; Caroline era; Political history
- Institutions: Oriel College, Oxford; University of Southampton; University of Warwick; Queen Mary University of London

Kevin M. Sharpe (26 January 1949 – 5 November 2011) was a British historian, Director of the Centre for Renaissance and Early Modern Studies, Leverhulme Research Professor and Professor of Renaissance Studies at Queen Mary, University of London. He is best known for his work on the reign of Charles I of England.

== Education and career ==
Kevin Sharpe studied as an undergraduate and postgraduate at St Catherine's College, Oxford, and from 1974 to 1978, he was a junior research fellow at Oriel College, Oxford. Formerly he was visiting Professor at Princeton, Stanford, the California Institute of Technology, the Australian National University and the Max Planck Institute, Göttingen. He was also lecturer at the University of Southampton, where he was awarded a personal chair in 1994. From 2001 he worked at the University of Warwick, and from 2005 at Queen Mary University of London.

During the late 1970s and 1980s, Sharpe, together with scholars such as Conrad Russell, John Morrill, and Mark Kishlansky, was labelled a revisionist political historian for his criticism of the previous Whiggish narrative of the English Revolution. Particularly, Sharpe advocated a revisionist interpretation of the period in English history beginning from the Caroline period towards the English Revolution, suggesting that the English nation during the 1620s was not as divided as traditionally portrayed. As a leading revisionist, he welcomed the shift towards increased role of literary and artistic representations in the chronicle of early modern politics.

== Publications ==
- Reading Authority and Representing Rule in Early Modern England, Bloomsbury, 2013 ISBN 978-1-4411-5675-4
- Image Wars: Promoting Kings and Commonwealths in England, 1603–1660, Yale University Press, 2010, ISBN 978-0300162004
- Selling the Tudor Monarchy: Authority and Image in Sixteenth Century England, YUP, 2009, ISBN 978-0300140989
- Remapping Early Modern England: The Culture of Seventeenth-Century Politics, Cambridge University Press, 2000, ISBN 978-0521664097
- Reading Revolutions: The Politics of Reading in Early Modern England, Yale University Press, 2000, ISBN 0300081529
- The Personal Rule of Charles I, Yale University Press, 1992, ISBN 978-0300056884
- Criticism and Compliment: The Politics of Literature in the England of Charles I, CUP, 1987, ISBN 978-0521386616
- Sir Robert Cotton, 1586–1631: History and Politics in Early Modern England, OUP, 1979, ISBN 978-0198218777

As editor:

- Sharpe, Kevin; Zwicker, Steven N., eds. (1987). Politics of Discourse: The Literature and History of Seventeenth-Century England. Berkeley, CA: UCP. ISBN 978-0520060708.

== Honours ==
- Fellow of the Royal Historical Society since 1979
- Fellow of the English Association since 2002.
- Whitfield prize of the Royal Historical Society for his book of 1987, Criticism and Compliment: The Politics of Literature in the England of Charles I
- Fletcher Jones research professor at the Huntington Library
- Mellon professor at the California Institute of Technology
