= Geoffrey Scammell =

British historian (1925–2006)

Geoffrey Vaughan Scammell
- Born: 11 July 1925; Wallasey, Merseyside
- Died: Cambridge, 2006
- Education: Wallasey Grammar School, Merseyside and Emmanuel College, University of Cambridge
- Known for: Authority on Tudor and Stuart maritime life

Geoffrey Vaughan Scammell (11 July 1925 – 2006) was a British historian and fellow of Emmanuel College, Cambridge, who was an authority on Tudor and Stuart maritime history.

== Early life ==
Geoffrey Scammell was born on 11 July 1925 in Wallasey, Merseyside, England. He attended Wallasey Grammar School and graduated from Emmanuel College, Cambridge, with a BA in 1948 (MA 1953).

== Career ==
Scammell served in the Royal Navy as a lieutenant from 1943 to 1946. His academic career began after his war service, first as a Fellow of Emmanuel College and then at the University of Durham as Lecturer in Diplomatic History. In 1965 he became a Fellow of Pembroke College, Cambridge. He was director of studies in history at Cambridge from 1965 to 1992 and emeritus fellow at Pembroke College from 1992.

He wrote primarily about the maritime history of the Tudor and Stuart period and was chairman of the British committee of the International Maritime History Committee from 1978 to 1989.

== Death ==
Scammell died in Cambridge in 2006.

== Selected publications ==
- Hugh Du Puiset: A Biography of the Twelfth-Century Bishop of Durham. Cambridge University Press, Cambridge, 1956.
- The World Encompassed: The First European Maritime Empires c.800-1650. First published in 1981 by Methuen and Co Ltd and University of California Press, Berkeley, second edition published in 2018 by Routledge, 2 Park Square, Milton Park, Abingdon, Oxon and by Routledge, 711 Third Avenue, New York, NY 10017.
- The English Chartered Trading Companies and the Sea. National Maritime Museum, London, 1983.
- The First Imperial Age: European Overseas Expansion, c.1400-1715. Unwin Hyman, London, 1989.
- Ships, Oceans and Empire: Studies in European Maritime and Colonial History, 1400-1750. Variorum, Aldershot, 1995. ISBN 0860784754
- Seafaring, Sailors and Trade, 1450-1750: Studies in British and European Maritime and Imperial History. Ashgate Variorum, Aldershot, 2003. ISBN 0860788970
