= Oxford Parliament (1644) =

17th-century English parliament

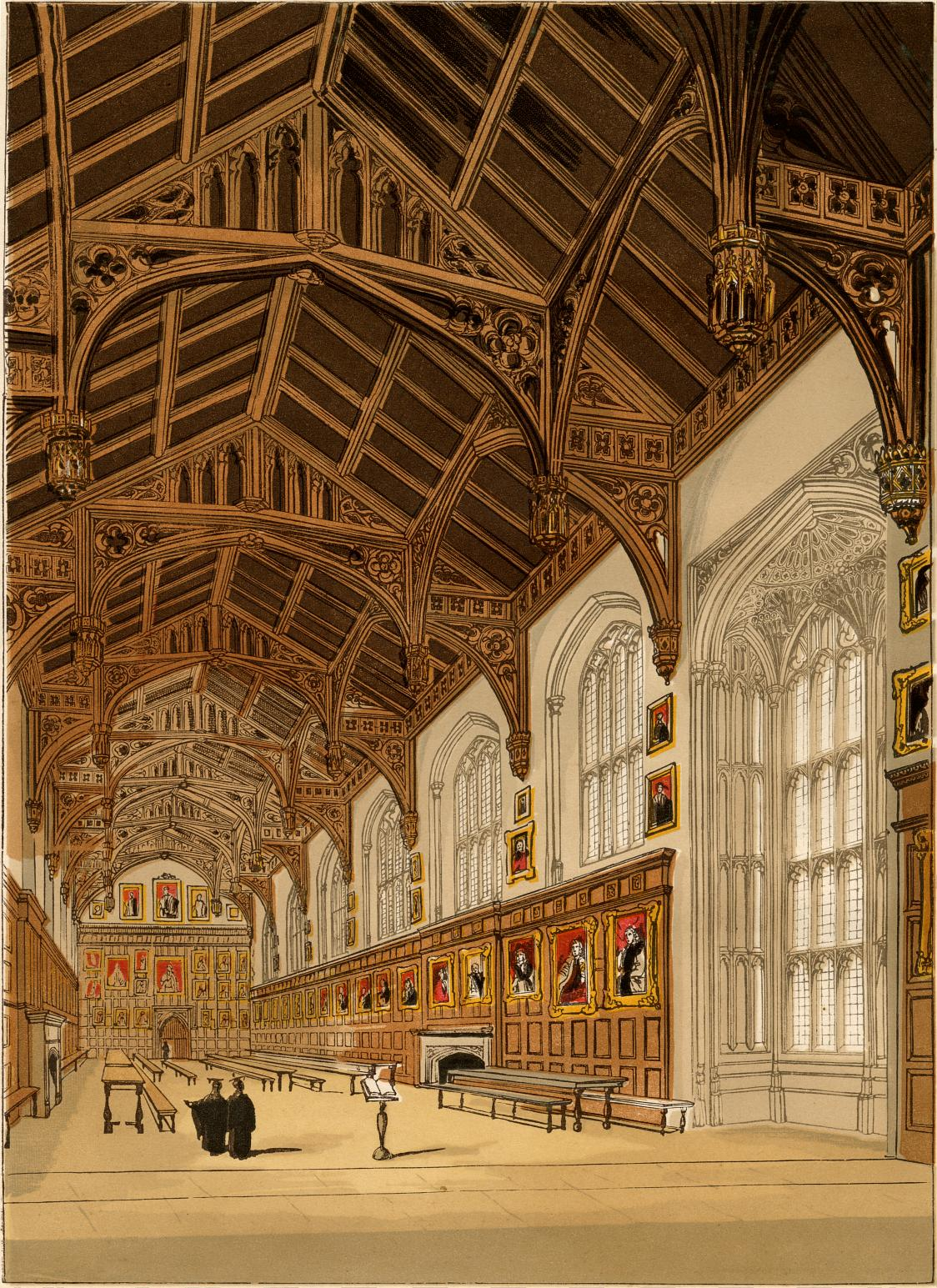
Christ Church hall, depicted in 1845, where the Parliament met

The Oxford Parliament, also known as the Mongrel Parliament, was the Parliament assembled by Charles I of England for the first time on 22 January 1644 and adjourned for the last time on 10 March 1645, with the purpose of being an instrument of the Royalist war campaign.

Charles was advised by Edward Hyde and others not to dissolve the Long Parliament as this would violate the statute of 1641 which said that Parliament could not be dissolved without its own consent. So all members of the Long Parliament were summoned by King Charles to assemble for a session of Parliament to be held at Christ Church Hall, Oxford. Eighty-two peers, which was most of the House of Lords, and 175 commoners, which was about one-third of the House of Commons, heeded the summons and came. Sir Sampson Eure was elected as Speaker of the House of Commons.

The Parliament met a number of times during the First English Civil War and was seen by Charles as a way of raising revenue. However, some of the members defected back to Westminster because they did not like his alliance with Irish Catholics, and others argued strongly for a negotiated peace with the Long Parliament in Westminster Hall. Charles's intercepted letters, published by the London Parliament as The King's Cabinet Opened revealed the King's distaste for the Parliament which he referred to as "the Mongrel Parliament", a name to which it was often referred.

The first session lasted from 22 January 1644 until 16 April 1644. The second session was from 8 October 1644 until 10 March 1645.

Not much is known of its proceedings because all its records were burnt just before Oxford fell to Parliamentary forces in 1646.

== See also ==
- List of parliaments of England
- Oxford Parliament (1258)
- Oxford Parliament (1681)
