= Stuart period =

Period in British history from 1603 to 1714

Stuart era
- 1603–1714
| Tudor era | Georgian era |
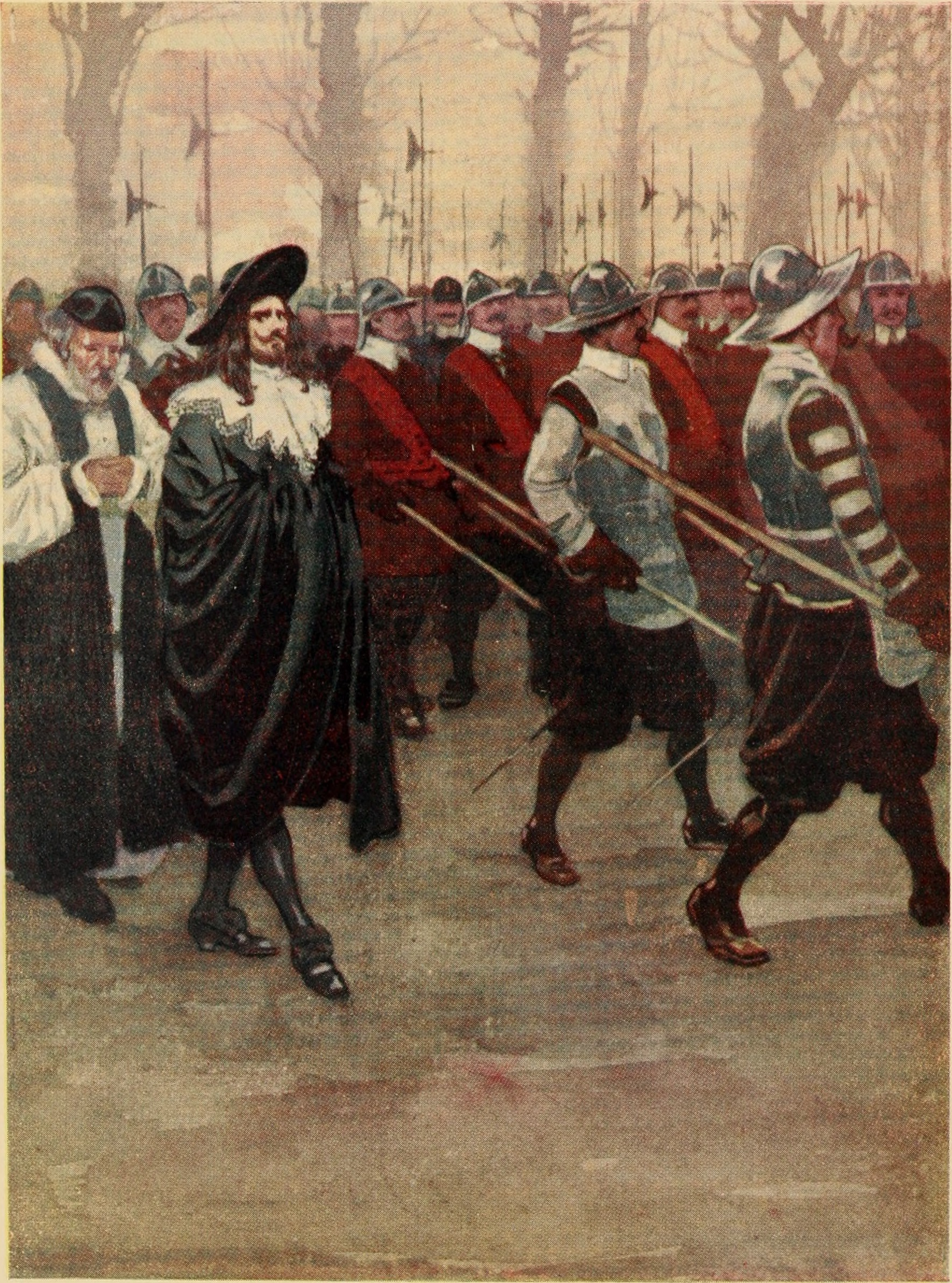
- King Charles I and the soldiers of the English Civil War as illustrated in An Island Story: A Child's History of England (1906)
- Including: Jacobean era; Caroline era; Interregnum; Restoration
- Monarchs: James I; Charles I; Charles II; James II; Mary II; William III; Anne
- Leaders: Oliver Cromwell; Richard Cromwell

The Stuart period of British history lasted from 1603 to 1714 during the dynasty of the House of Stuart. The period was plagued by internal and religious strife, and a large-scale civil war which resulted in the execution of King Charles I in 1649. The Interregnum, largely under the control of Oliver Cromwell, is included here for continuity, even though the Stuarts were in exile. The Cromwell regime collapsed and Charles II had very wide support for his taking of the throne in 1660. His brother James II was overthrown in 1689 in the Glorious Revolution. He was replaced by his Protestant daughter Mary II and her Dutch husband William III. Mary's sister Anne was the last of the line. For the next half century James II and his son James Francis Edward Stuart and grandson Charles Edward Stuart claimed that they were the true Stuart kings, but they were in exile and their attempts to return with French aid were defeated. The period ended with the death of Queen Anne and the accession of King George I from the German House of Hanover.

== Political history ==
=== James VI and I: 1603–1625 ===
==== Rule of the upper-classes ====
England was ruled at the national level by royalty and nobility, and at the local level by the lesser nobility and the gentry. Together they comprised about 2% of the families, owned most of the good farmland, and controlled local government affairs. The aristocracy was growing steadily in numbers, wealth, and power. From 1540 to 1640, the number of peers (dukes, earls, marquises, viscounts, and barons) grew from 60 families to 160. They inherited their titles through primogeniture, had a favoured position in legal matters, enjoyed the highest positions in society, and held seats in the House of Lords. In 1611, the king looking for new revenue sources created the hereditary rank of baronet, with a status below that of the nobility, and no seat in Lords, and a price tag of about £1100. The vast land holdings seized from the monasteries under Henry VIII in the 1530s were sold mostly to local gentry, greatly expanding the wealth of that class of gentlemen. The gentry tripled to 15,000 from 5000 in the century after 1540. Many families died out, and others moved up, so that 6 out of 7 of the peers in 1714 had been created by Stuart kings since 1603. Historians engaged in a lively debate—dubbed the "Storm over the gentry"—about the theory that the rising gentry class increasingly took power away from the static nobility, and generally reject it. Both the gentry and the nobility were gaining power, and the English Civil War was not a battle between them. In terms of religious affiliation in England, the Catholics were down to about 3% of the population, but comprised about 12% of the gentry and nobility.

==== Three kingdoms ====
James VI, king of Scotland, also became king of the entirely separate kingdom of England when Elizabeth I died. He also became king of Ireland, but the English were just reestablishing lost control there. The English re-conquest was completed after victory in the Nine Years' War, 1594–1603. James' appointees in Dublin as Lord Deputy of Ireland established real control over Ireland for the first time, bringing a centralised government to the entire island, and successfully disarmed the native lordships. The great majority of the Irish population remained Catholic, but James promoted Protestant plantations from Scotland into the Ulster region. The colonisers were known as Scots-Irish or Scotch-Irish. In turn many of them migrated to the new American colonies during the Stuart period.

=== Charles I: 1625–1649 ===
Due to King James' decline in physical and mental strength, decision-making was increasingly in the hands of Charles and especially George Villiers (1592–1628), (he was Earl of Buckingham from 1617 and Duke from 1623). Buckingham showed a very high degree of energy and application, as well as a huge appetite for rewards and riches. By 1624 he was effectively the ruler of England. In 1625 Charles became the king of a land deeply involved in a European war and rent by escalating religious controversies. Buckingham and Charles developed a foreign policy based on an alliance with France against Spain. Major foreign adventures against Cádiz in 1625 and in support of French Huguenots in 1627 were total disasters. Widespread rumour shaped public opinion that blamed Buckingham, rather than the king, for the ills that beset England. When Parliament twice opened impeachment proceedings, the king simply prorogued (suspended) the Parliament. Buckingham was assassinated in 1628 by John Felton, a dissatisfied Army officer. The assassin was executed, but he nevertheless became a heroic martyr across the three kingdoms. Like his father, King Charles believed in the divine right of kings to rule, and he was unable to work successfully with Parliament. By 1628 he and Buckingham had transformed the political landscape. In 1629 the king dissolved parliament and began a period of eleven years of personal rule.

==== Personal rule: 1629–1640 ====
English government was quite small, for the king had no standing army, and no bureaucracy stationed around the country. Laws were enforced primarily by local officials controlled by the local elites. Military operations were typically handled by hired mercenaries. The greatest challenge King Charles faced in ruling without a parliament was raising money. The crown was in debt nearly £1.2 million; financiers in the City refused new loans. Charles saved money by signing peace treaties with France in 1629 and Spain in 1630, and avoiding involvement in the Thirty Years' War. He cut the usual budget but it was not nearly enough. Then he discovered a series of ingenious methods to raise money without the permission of Parliament. They had been rarely used, but were nevertheless legal. He sold monopolies, despite their unpopularity. He fined the landowners for supposedly encroaching on the royal forests. Compulsory knighthood had been established in the Middle Ages when men of certain wealth were ordered to become knights in the king's service, or else pay a fine. When knighthood lost its military status, the fines continued for a time, but they had been abandoned by 1560. James reinstated the fine, and hired new officials to search local records to find wealthy men who did not have knighthood status. They were forced to pay, including Oliver Cromwell among thousands of other country gentlemen across rural England. £173,000 was raised, in addition to raising bitter anger among the gentry. The king finally crossed the line of legality when he began to levy "ship money", intended for naval defences, upon interior towns. Protests now escalated to include urban elites. All the new measures generated long-term outrage, but they did balance the short-term budget, which averaged £600,000, without the need to call Parliament into session.

==== Long Parliament of 1640 ====
Revolts broke out in Scotland in response to the king's imposition of the Book of Common Prayer, which threatened to undermine the religion of the people. The Scots drove English forces out and forced the king to subsidise the insurgents who were now occupying part of northern England. A major revolt among Catholics in Ireland killed thousands of Scots Irish—there was no doubt it had to be suppressed and new taxes would be needed to pay the costs of military action. A new Parliament had to be called. The Long Parliament elected in 1640 proved just as difficult for Charles as had the Short Parliament. It assembled on 3 November 1640 and quickly began proceedings to impeach and remove the king's leading counsellors for high treason. Thomas Wentworth, 1st Earl of Strafford was taken into custody on 10 November; William Laud, the Archbishop of Canterbury was impeached on 18 December; John Finch, 1st Baron Finch, now Lord Keeper of the Great Seal, was impeached the following day, and he fled to Holland. To prevent the king from dissolving it at will, Parliament passed the Triennial Act 1640, which required Parliament to be summoned at least once every three years, and permitted the Lord Keeper and 12 peers to summon Parliament if the king failed to do so. The act was coupled with a subsidy bill, and so to secure the latter, Charles grudgingly granted royal assent in February 1641.

=== Civil War and Interregnum: 1642–1660 ===
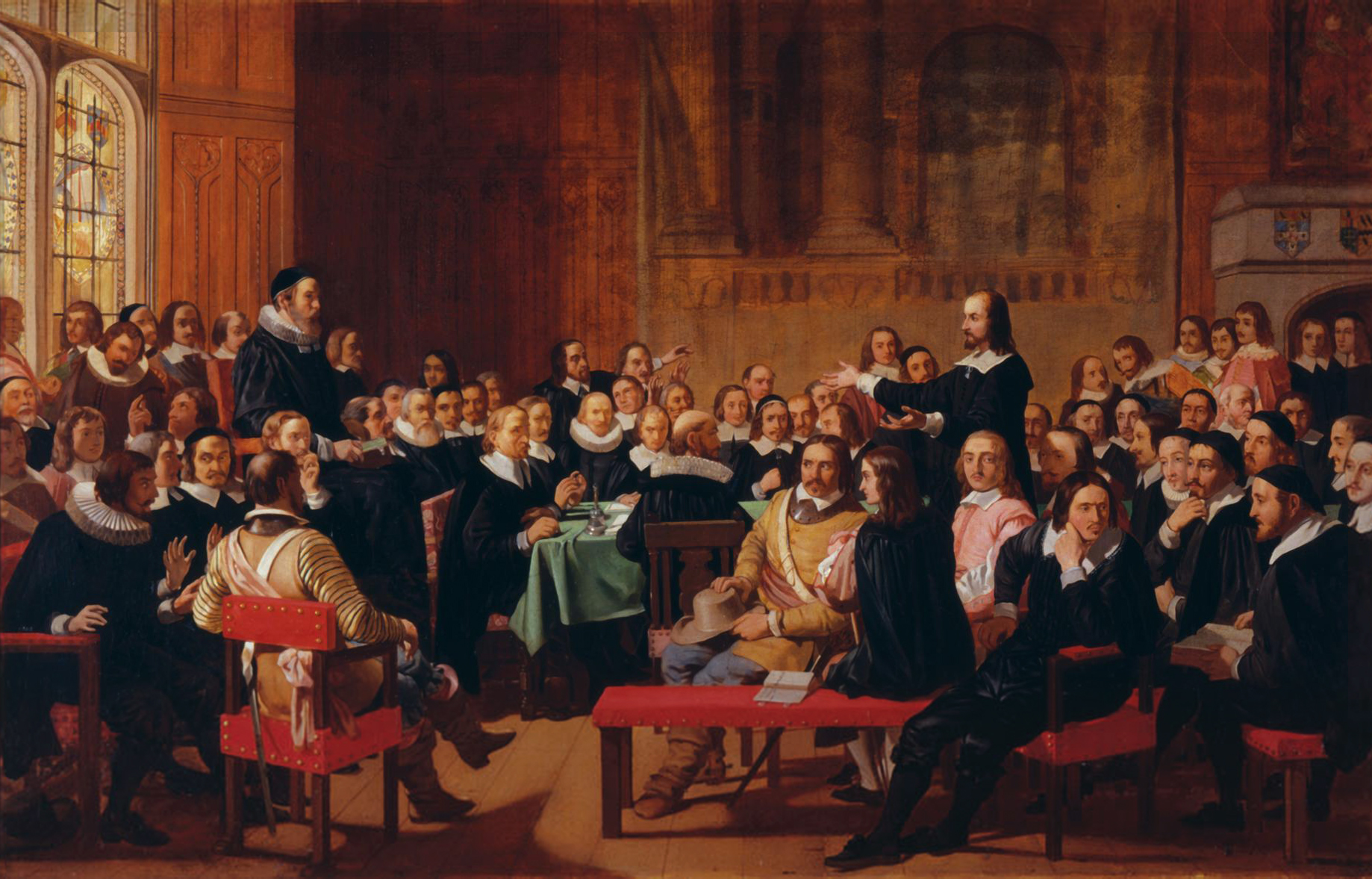
The Westminster Assembly, which saw disputes on Church polity in England

The First English Civil War of 1642–1645 ended in victory for the Parliamentarians over the Royalists (often called "Cavaliers"). The Parliamentarians were often called "Roundheads" because of their short practical haircuts. The Second English Civil War was fought in 1648–1649; Charles lost and the execution of Charles I took place in January 1649.

The monarchy was temporarily displaced by the Commonwealth of England from 1649 to 1660. Oliver Cromwell ruled directly from 1653 to his death in 1658, whereupon his Commonwealth disintegrated. The Convention Parliament welcomed Charles II, son of Charles I, to return from exile and become king.

The war period (1642–1651) saw a series of armed conflicts and political machinations between Parliamentarians and Royalists, with most of the fighting in England. The first (1642–1646) and second (1648–1649) wars pitted the supporters of King Charles I against the supporters of the Long Parliament, while the third (1649–1651) saw fighting between supporters of King Charles II and supporters of the Rump Parliament. The war ended with the Parliamentarian victory at the Battle of Worcester on 3 September 1651. Historians debate whether the main determinant of the outcome was based on superior operational decisions and decisive battlefield events (as argued by Malcolm Wanklyn), or rather Parliament's long-run superiority in manpower and money (as argued by Clive Holmes).

The overall outcome was threefold: the trial and execution of Charles I (1649); the exile of his son, Charles II (1651); and the replacement of English monarchy with, at first, the Commonwealth of England (1649–1653) and then the Protectorate under the personal rule of Oliver Cromwell (1653–1658). When Cromwell died his son Richard Cromwell was incapable of governing, and the Puritan army directly ruled the three kingdoms, to the growing disgust of all classes of people. The monopoly of the Church of England on religion was strengthened by the suppression of the last remnants of Catholicism, and the powerful forces of Puritanism and Nonconformism. Constitutionally, the wars convinced everyone that an English monarch cannot govern alone, nor could Parliament. They were both essential.

==== Cromwell ====
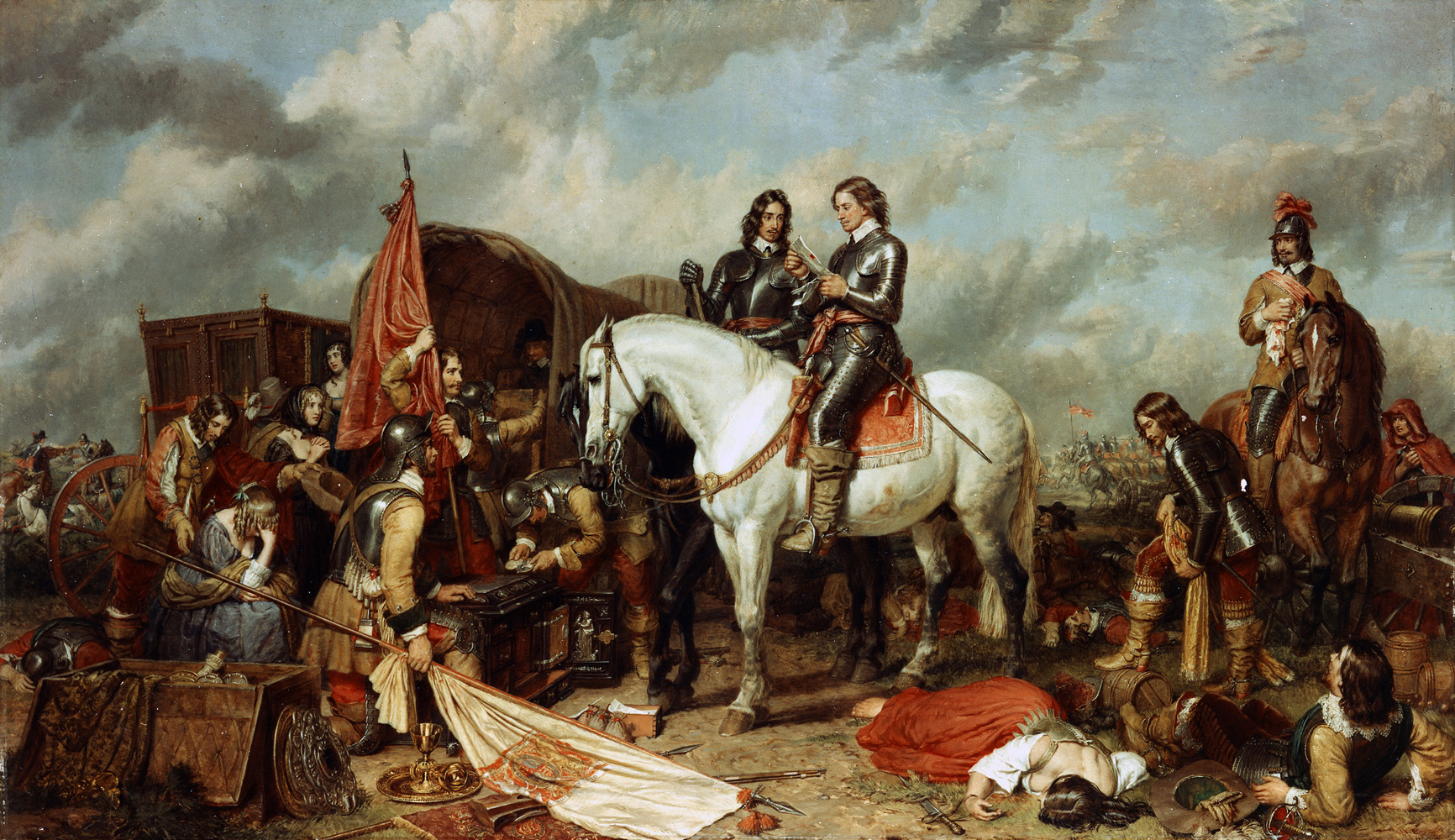
Cromwell at the Battle of Naseby by Charles Landseer, 1851

In 1649–59 the dominant figure in England was Oliver Cromwell, who was a Parliamentarian general.

===== The Commonwealth: 1649–1653 =====
After the execution of the King, a republic was declared, known as the Commonwealth of England. A Council of State was appointed to manage affairs, which included Cromwell among its members. His real power base was in the army; Cromwell tried but failed to unite the original group of 'Royal Independents' centred around St John and Saye and Sele, but only St John was persuaded to retain his seat in Parliament. From the middle of 1649 until 1651, Cromwell was away on campaign. In the meantime, with the king gone (and with him their common cause), the various factions in Parliament began to fight each other. On his return, Cromwell tried to galvanise the Rump into setting dates for new elections, uniting the three kingdoms under one polity, and to put in place a broad-brush, tolerant national church. However, the Rump vacillated in setting election dates, and although it put in place a basic liberty of conscience, it failed to produce an alternative for tithes or dismantle other aspects of the existing religious settlement. In frustration, Cromwell eventually dismissed the Rump Parliament in 1653. He summoned a new Parliament, whose members were all nominated. Sometimes known as the Parliament of Saints, it was also called the Barebones Parliament. The Parliament was based on an idea of Major-General Thomas Harrison's for a "sanhedrin" of saints. Although Cromwell did not subscribe to Harrison's apocalyptic, Fifth Monarchist beliefs – which saw a sanhedrin as the precondition of Christ's rule on earth – he was attracted by the idea of an assembly made up of a cross-section of sects. However, its failure to deal with the complex political, legal and religious problems facing England soon led to its closeure.

===== The Protectorate: 1653–1658 =====
In December 1653 Cromwell was appointed Lord Protector, with powers akin to those of a monarch. Cromwell's power was buttressed by his continuing popularity among the army, which he had built up during the civil wars, and which he subsequently prudently guarded, and during his period of dictatorship he divided England into military districts ruled by Army Major Generals who answered only to him. The 15 major generals and deputy major generals—called "godly governors"—were central to Cromwell's moral crusade beginning in October 1655. They lasted less than a year. The generals not only supervised militia forces and security commissions, but collected taxes and insured support for the government in the English and Welsh provinces. They were resented by provincials. Many members of Parliament feared the generals threatened their reform efforts and authority. Their position was further harmed by a tax proposal by Major General John Desborough to provide financial backing for their work, which Parliament voted down for fear of a permanent military state. Ultimately, however, Cromwell's failure to support his men, sacrificing them to his opponents, caused their demise.

The First Anglo-Dutch War broke out in 1652, against the Republic of the Seven United Netherlands, eventually won by the Royal Navy under Admiral Robert Blake in 1654.

Cromwell was aware of the contribution that Jewish financiers made to the economic success of Holland, now England's leading commercial rival. It was this that led to his encouraging Jews to return to England, 350 years after their banishment, in the hope that they would help speed up the recovery of the country after the disruption of the Civil Wars.

In 1657, Cromwell was offered the crown by a re-constituted Parliament; since he had been instrumental in abolishing the monarchy he said no after long deliberation. He ruled as king in all but name, but his office was not hereditary. Instead Cromwell was to nominate his own successor. Cromwell's new rights and powers were laid out in the Humble Petition and Advice, a legislative instrument which replaced the 1653 Instrument of Government.

==== Historiography ====
The older historiography came in two flavours: The Whig history interpretation and the Marxist historiography interpretation. The Whig model, dominant in the 19th century, saw an inherent conflict between irresistible, truly English ideals of liberty and individualism represented by The Puritans and Roundheads, overcoming the medieval concept of the king as the unquestionable voice of God. Historians became increasingly uncomfortable with the writing of history as a predetermined search for an idealistic goal, and the Whig approach lost favour after the First World War (1914–1918). Meanwhile, in the late 19th century, the remarkably high quality scholarship of archivally oriented historians, especially Samuel Rawson Gardiner and Charles Harding Firth had provided the rich details on national politics, practically on a day-by-day basis. Scholars, however, generally neglected the local dimension.

In the post-war era (1945–), the class conflict of the Marxist interpretation emerged as a powerful explanation that seemed to tie all the details together. It portrayed a battle between the declining Crown and upper class feudalistic aristocracy, versus the rising middle class gentry. Marxists downplayed the religious dimension. On one side, influential names included R. H. Tawney, Lawrence Stone, and the Marxist Christopher Hill. The main argument was that the Civil War was a challenge launched by the rising gentry class to overcome the power of the Crown and the aristocracy. Marxists like Hill saw the war as England's bourgeois revolution—that is, the overthrow of an outdated feudal order by the new middle class. The class conflict interpretation was vigorously challenged by conservative scholars, such as Hugh Trevor-Roper, who argued that the gentry was not rising but instead felt that its status was being undermined. It fought back against its exclusion from the power, patronage and payoff by an extravagant court, by the king's swelling state bureaucracy and by the nouveau riche financiers in London.

Marxist historiography itself lost much of its intellectual support after the 1960s. "Revisionists" came to the fore, rejecting both Whig and Marxist approaches because they assumed historical events were the automatic playing out of mysterious forces such as "liberty"and "class conflict." New microscopic local studies demonstrated that the class differences between the two sides varied greatly from place to place, and did not explain very much. Once The revisionists had dispatched the older models, the "post-revisionists" began to offer a multiplicity of small-scale explanations that fitted particular localities. Historians now give much more emphasis to religiosity, and to the diversity of local situations. Instead of an argument that massive popular anger had built up in the early 17th century and caused the Civil War, the current approaches depict the early Stuart period as marked by harmony, good government, and popular support. How then could there be a civil war? The current scholarly solution is to emphasise what historians call the "British problem", involving the impossible tensions occurring when a single person tried to hold together his three kingdoms with their entirely different geographical, ethnic, political, and religious values and traditions.

=== Restoration and Charles II: 1660–1685 ===
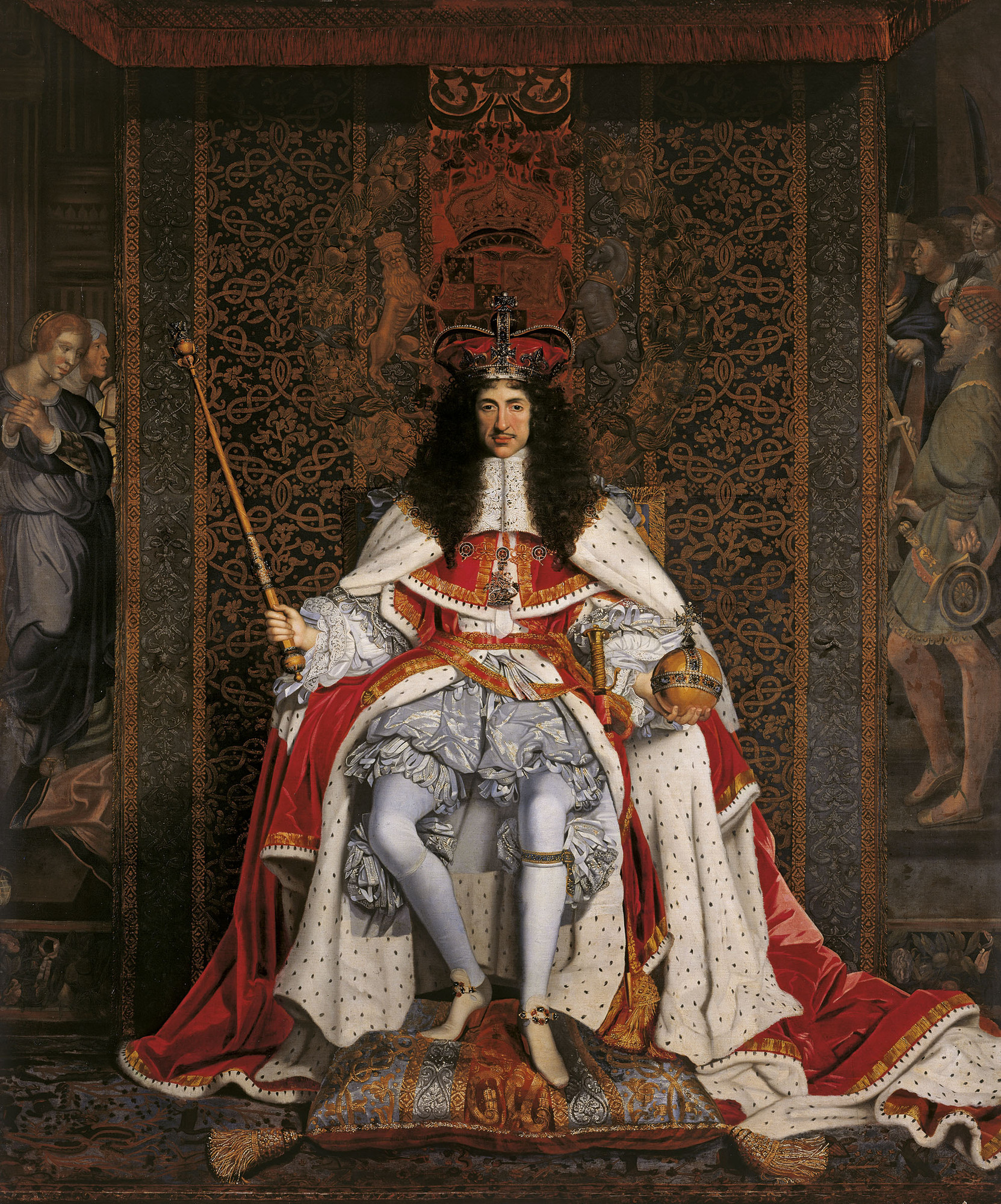
King Charles II takes the throne in 1660, painting by John Michael Wright (1617-94)

Widespread dissatisfaction with the lack of the king led to the Restoration in 1660, which was based on strong support for inviting Charles II to take the throne. The restoration settlement of 1660 reestablished the monarchy, and incorporated the lessons learned in the previous half century. The first basic lesson was that the king and the parliament were both needed, for troubles cumulated when the king attempted to rule alone (1629–1640), when Parliament ruled without a king (1642–1653) or when there was a military dictator (1653–1660). The Tory perspective involved a greater respect for the king, and for the Church of England. The Whig perspective involved a greater respect for Parliament. The two perspectives eventually coalesced into opposing political factions throughout the 18th century. The second lesson was that the highly moralistic Puritans were too inclined to divisiveness and political extremes. The Puritans and indeed all Protestants who did not closely adhere to the Church of England, were put under political and social penalties that lasted until the early 19th century. Even more severe restrictions were imposed on Catholics and Unitarians. The third lesson was that England needed protection against organised political violence. Politicized mobs in London, or popular revolts in the rural areas, were too unpredictable and too dangerous to be tolerated. The king's solution was a standing army, a professional force controlled by the king. This solution became highly controversial.

The Restoration of 1660 was a deliberate return to the stability of the early 17th century. There was very little recrimination. King Charles acted with moderation and self-restraint, and with energy and attention to details. The king reached out to everyone, finding high positions for his old friends and allies as well as places for his former enemies. By far the most important role went to Edward Hyde, who was made Earl of Clarendon and Lord Chancellor in 1660. He was largely in control of royal affairs, especially after his daughter Anne Hyde married the king's brother James (he became king in 1685). When the Second Anglo-Dutch War ended in failure in 1667, the king removed Clarendon in a severe confrontation; the earl was accused of treason and was banished to France. Charles was willing to talk to every faction in England, Ireland and Scotland, even with the Quakers, who were hated by practically everyone else. Charles gave out high offices in England with an eye toward favouring his longtime allies, and making sure his erstwhile enemies received at least some symbolic positions. In Scotland he included all of the important factions from the 1640s. In Ireland he retained the men currently in power.

The King and Parliament agreed on a general pardon, the Indemnity and Oblivion Act (1660). It covered everyone, with the exception of three dozen regicides who were tracked down for punishment. The terms of the settlement included giving the King a fixed annual payment of £1.2 million; Scotland and Ireland added small additional amounts. It was illegal to use dubious non-parliamentary fund-raising such as payments for knighthood, forced loans, and especially the much-hated ship money. Parliament did impose an entirely new excise tax on alcoholic beverages that raise substantial sums, as did the customs, for foreign trade was flourishing. Parliament closed down the harsh special courts that Charles had used before 1642, such as the Star Chamber, Court of High Commission, and the Council of the North. Parliament watched Charles' ministers closely for any signs of defiance, and was ready to use the impeachment procedure to remove offenders and even to pass bills of attainder to execute them without a trial.

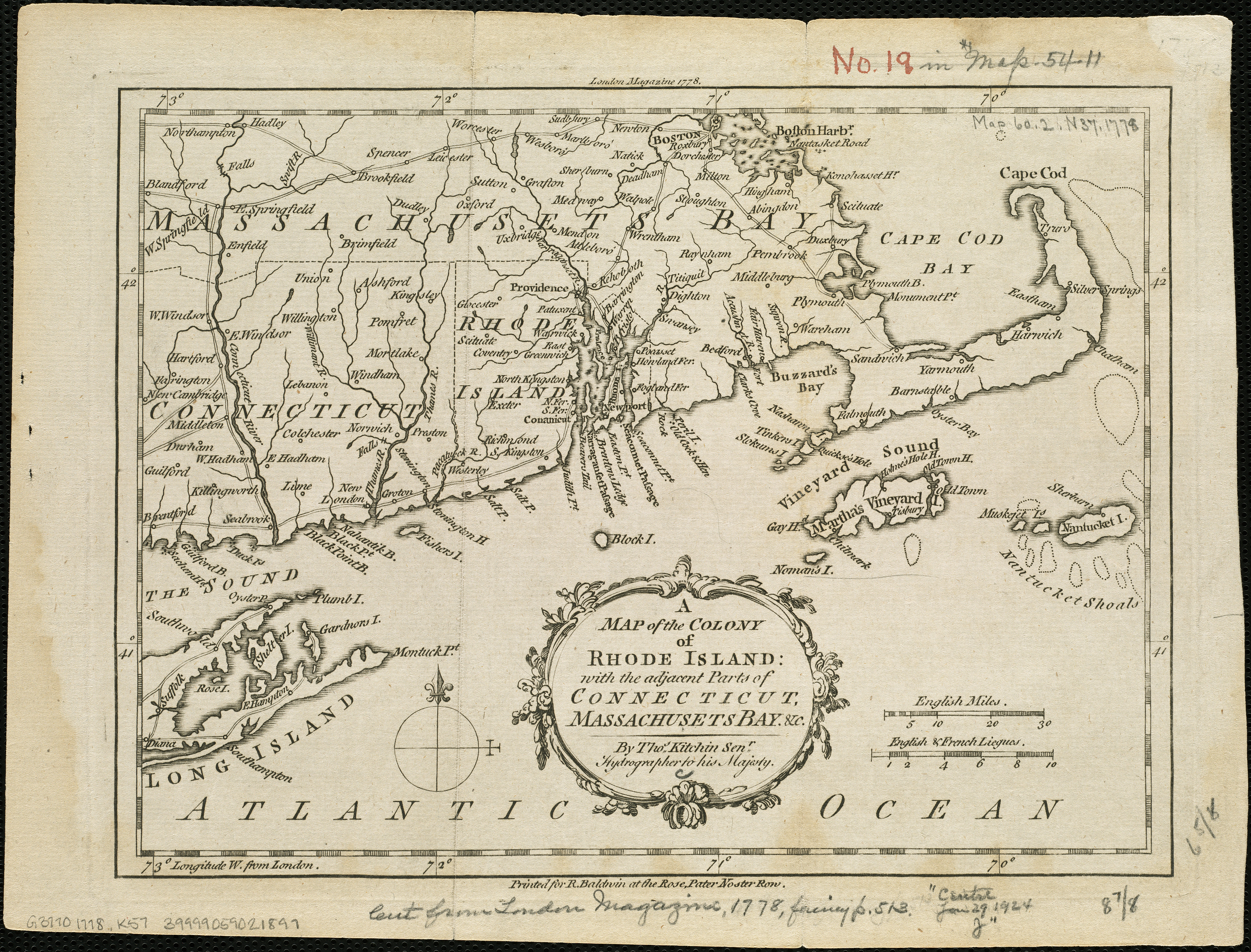
Colonists from the Massachusetts Bay Colony experienced minor interference from the king, and so were free to maintain their Puritan religious practices

Religious issues proved the most difficult to resolve. Charles reinstated the bishops, but also tried to reach out to the Presbyterians. Catholics were entirely shut out of opportunities to practice their religion or connect to the Papal States in Rome. The Royalists won a sweeping election victory in 1661; only 60 Presbyterians survived in Parliament. Severe restrictions were now imposed on the Nonconformist Protestant bodies in England, preventing them from holding scheduled church services, and prohibiting their members from holding government offices at the national or local level. For example, The five-mile law in 1665 made it a crime for nonconformist clergymen to be within 5 miles of their old parish. The Puritans still controlled the Massachusetts Bay Colony and the Connecticut Colony, but they kept a low profile during the interregnum. Charles II cancelled their charters and imposed centralised rule through the Dominion of New England. His colonial policies were reversed by William III. Most of the smaller independent religious factions faded away, except for the Quakers. The Congregationalists, Presbyterians, and Baptists remain, and were later joined by the Methodists. These non-Anglican Protestants continued as a political factor, with its leaders moving toward what became the Whig party. The country gentry continued to form the basis of support for the Church of England, and for what became the Tory party.

Parliament was especially alarmed at the success of Cromwell's New Model Army, which demonstrated that a well-organized, well-led professional army was far superior to poorly trained militia units. Cromwell had used his standing army to take full personal control, and so it was much to be feared as a threat to traditional liberties. The New Model Army was permanently disbanded, and all the soldiers received their full back pay. On the other hand, as long as enemy nations such as Spain and France, had large standing armies, England was practically defenceless on land. King and Parliament all agreed on the wisdom of a strong expanded Royal Navy. But while the king tried to build up a small standing army, Parliament kept a very close, nervous watch.

Puritanism was entirely out of fashion, as the royal court introduced a level of hedonism that far exceeded anything England had ever seen. Harris says, "At the center of this world was a libertine court – a society of Restoration rakes given more to drinking, gambling, swearing and whoring than to godliness – presided over by the King himself and his equally rakish brother James, Duke of York."

==== Standing army ====
England never had a standing army with professional officers and careerist corporals and sergeants. It relied on militia organised by local officials, private forces mobilised by the nobility, or on hired mercenaries from Europe. Cromwell changed all that with his New Model Army of 50,000 men, that proved vastly more effective than untrained militia, and enabled him to exert a powerful control at the local level over all of England. At the restoration, Parliament paid off Cromwell's army and disbanded it. For many decades the Cromwellian model was a horror story and the Whig element recoiled from allowing a standing army. The militia acts of 1661 and 1662 prevented local authorities from calling up militia and oppressing their own local opponents. Calling up the militia was possible only if the king and local elites agreed to do so. However, King Charles managed to pull together four regiments of infantry and cavalry, calling them his guards, at a cost of £122.000 from his general budget. This became the foundation of the permanent British Army, By 1685 it had grown to 7500 soldiers in marching regiments, and 1400 men permanently stationed in garrisons. A rebellion in 1685 allowed James II to raise the forces to 20,000 men. There were 37,000 in 1678, when England played a role in the closing stage of the Franco-Dutch War. In 1689, William III expanded the army to 74,000 soldiers, and then to 94,000 in 1694. Parliament became very nervous, and reduced the cadre to 7,000 in 1697. Scotland and Ireland had theoretically separate military establishments, but they were unofficially merged with the English force.

=== Glorious Revolution of 1688–1689 ===
The British have always regarded the overthrow of King James II of England in 1688 as a decisive break in history, especially as it made the Parliament of England supreme over the King and guaranteed a bill of legal rights to everyone. Steven Pincus argues that this revolution was the first modern revolution; it was violent, popular, and divisive. He rejects older theories to the effect that it was an aristocratic coup or a Dutch invasion. Instead, Pincus argues it was a widely supported and decisive rejection of James II. The people could not tolerate James any longer. He was too close to the French throne; he was too Roman Catholic; and they distrusted his absolutist modernisation of the state. What they got instead was the vision of William of Orange, shared by most leading Englishmen, that emphasised consent of all the elites, religious toleration of all Protestant sects, free debate in Parliament and aggressive promotion of commerce. Pincus sees a dramatic transformation that reshaped religion, political economy, foreign policy and even the nature of the English state.

=== William and Mary: 1688–1702 ===
During the joint rule of William and Mary, William made the decisions when he was in Britain; Mary was in charge when he was out of the country and also handled Church affairs. William encouraged the passage of major laws that protected personal liberties. of the Toleration Act 1689, which guaranteed religious toleration to Protestant nonconformists. It did not, however, extend toleration as far as he wished, still restricting the religious liberty of Roman Catholics, non-trinitarians, and those of non-Christian faiths. In December 1689, one of the fundamental constitutional documents in English history, the Bill of Rights, was passed. The Act restated and confirmed many provisions of the earlier Declaration of Right, and established restrictions on the royal prerogative. It provided that the Sovereign could not suspend laws passed by Parliament, levy taxes without parliamentary consent, infringe the right to petition, raise a standing army during peacetime without parliamentary consent, deny the right to bear arms to Protestant subjects, unduly interfere with parliamentary elections, punish members of either House of Parliament for anything said during debates, require excessive bail or inflict cruel and unusual punishments. William was opposed to the imposition of such constraints, but he chose not to engage in a conflict with Parliament and agreed to abide by the statute.

==== Foreign policy ====
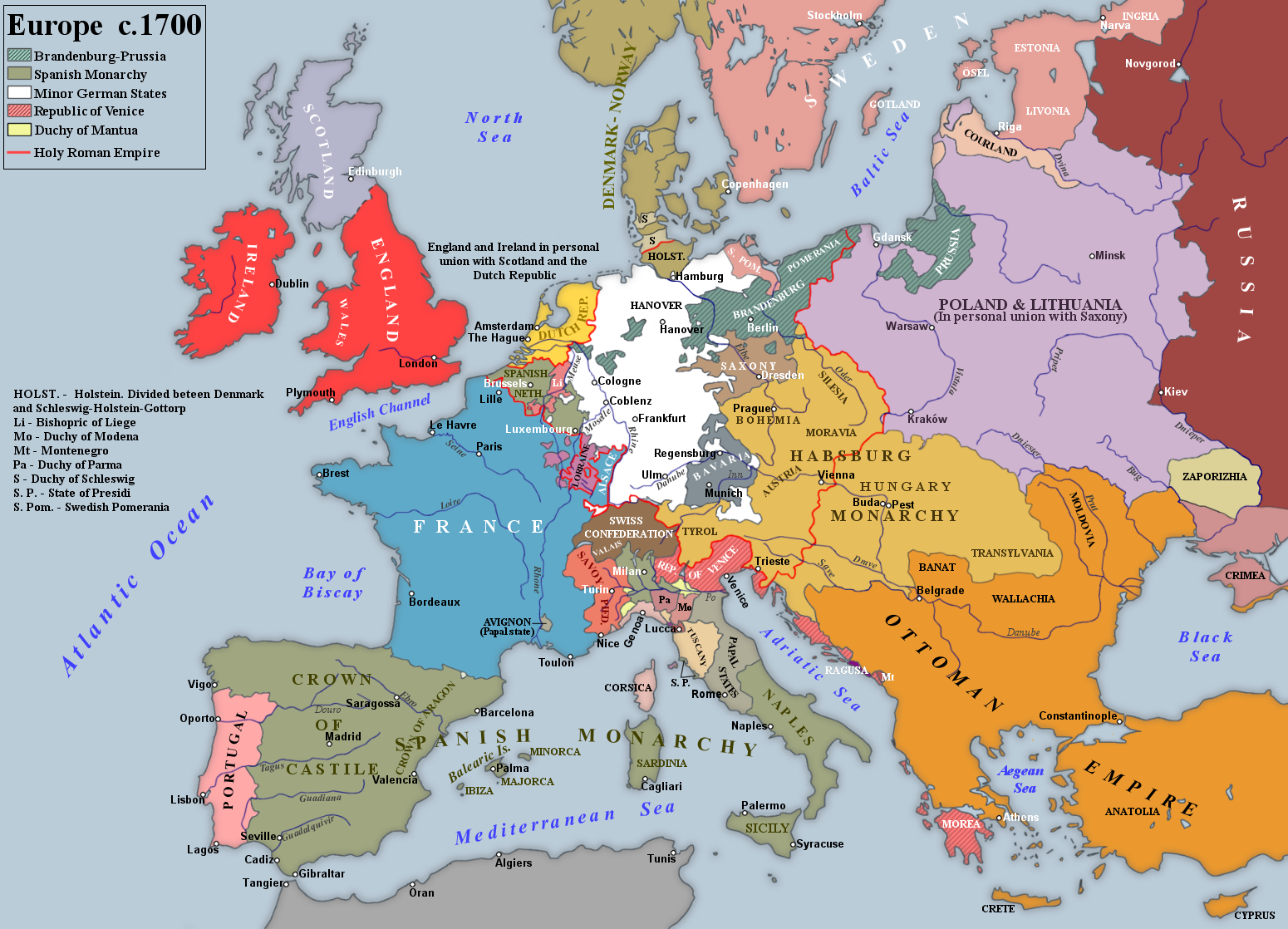
Europe in 1700; England and Ireland are in red.

The primary reason the English elite called on William to invade England in 1688 was to overthrow the king James II, and stop his efforts to reestablish Catholicism and tolerate Puritanism. However the primary reason William accepted the challenge was to gain a powerful ally in his war to contain the threatened expansion of King Louis XIV of France. William's goal was to build coalitions against the powerful French monarchy, protect the autonomy of the Netherlands (where William continued in power) and to keep the Spanish Netherlands (present-date Belgium) out of French hands. The English elite was intensely anti-French, and generally supported William's broad goals. For his entire career in Netherlands and Britain, William was the arch-enemy of Louis XIV. The French king denounced William as a usurper who had illegally taken the throne from the legitimate king James II and ought to be overthrown.

In May 1689, William, now king of England, with the support of Parliament, declared war on France. England and France would be at war almost continuously until 1713, with a short interlude 1697–1701 made possible by the Treaty of Ryswick. The combined English and Dutch fleets could overpower France in a far-flung naval war, but France still had superiority on land. William wanted to neutralise that advantage by allying with Leopold I, the Habsburg Emperor of the Holy Roman Empire (1658–1705), who was based in Vienna, Austria. Leopold, however, was tied down in war with the Ottoman Empire on his eastern frontiers; William worked to achieve a negotiated settlement between the Ottomans and the Empire. William displayed in imaginative Europe-wide strategy, but Louis always managed to come up with a counter play. William was usually supported by the English leadership, which saw France as its greatest enemy. But eventually the expenses, and war weariness, but the second thoughts. At first, Parliament voted him the funds for his expensive wars, and for his subsidies to smaller allies. Private investors created the Bank of England in 1694; it provided a sound system that made financing wars much easier by encouraging bankers to loan money.

In the long-running Nine Years' War (1688–97) his main strategy was to form a military alliance of England, the Netherlands, the Holy Roman Empire, Spain, and some smaller states, to attack France at sea, and from land in different directions, while defending the Netherlands. Louis XIV tried to undermine this strategy by refusing to recognise William as king of England, and by giving diplomatic, military and financial support to a series of pretenders to the English throne, all based in France. William III focused most of his attention on foreign policy and foreign wars, spending a great deal of time in the Netherlands (where he continued to hold the dominant political office). His closest foreign-policy advisers were Dutch, most notably William Bentinck, 1st Earl of Portland; they shared little information with their English counterparts. The net result was that the Netherlands remained independent, and France never took control of the Spanish Netherlands. The wars were very expensive to both sides but inconclusive. William died just as the continuation war, the War of the Spanish Succession, (1702–1714), was beginning. It was fought out by Queen Anne, and ended in a draw.

==== Legacy of William III ====
Historian Stephen B. Baxter is a leading specialist on William III, and like nearly all his biographers he has a highly favourable opinion of the king:

William III was the Deliverer of England from the tyranny and arbitrary government of the Stuarts....He repaired and improved an obsolete system of government, and left it strong enough to withstand the stresses of the next century virtually unchanged. The army of Marlborough, and that of Wellington, and to a large extent that of Raglan, was the creation of William III. So too was the independence of the judiciary..... [His government] was very expensive; at their peak the annual expenditures of William III were four times as large as those of James II. This new scale of government was bitterly unpopular. But the new taxes, which were not in fact heavy by comparison with those borne by the Dutch, made England a great power. And they contributed to the prosperity of the country while they contributed to its strength, by the process which is now called 'pump-priming.'

=== Queen Anne: 1702–1714 ===
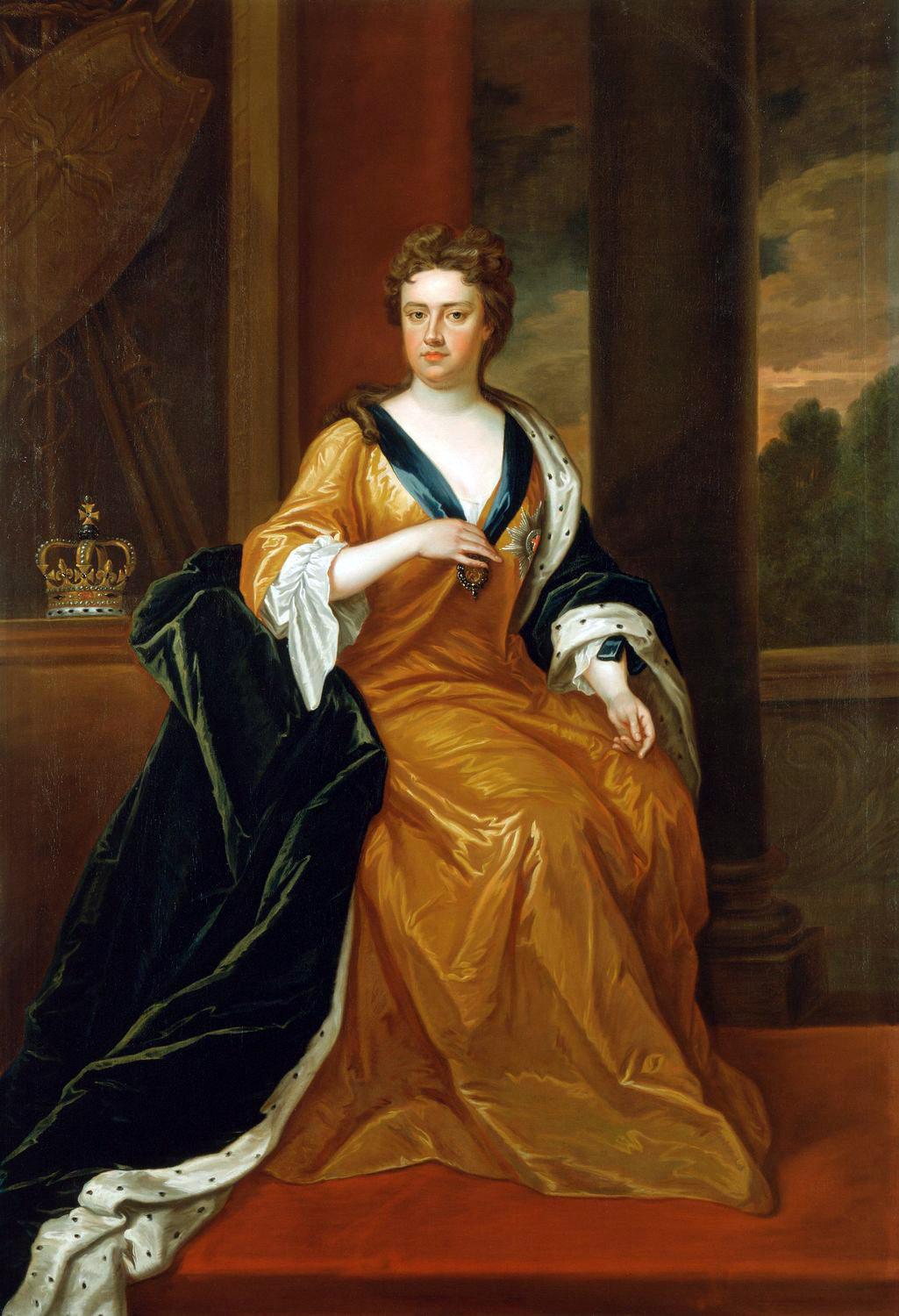
Queen Anne by Charles Jervas

Anne became queen in 1702 at age 37, succeeding William III whom she hated. For practically her entire reign, the central issue was the War of the Spanish Succession in which Britain played a major role in the European-wide alliance against Louis XIV of France. Down until 1710, the Parliament was dominated by the "Whig Junto" coalition. She disliked them and relied instead on her old friends Duke of Marlborough (and his wife Sarah Churchill), and chief minister Lord Godolphin (1702–1710). She made Marlborough captain-general and head of the army; his brilliant victories boded well for Britain at first. But the war dragged on into an expensive stalemate. The opposition Tories had opposed the war all along, and now won a major electoral victory in 1710. Anne reacted by dismissing Marlborough and Godolphin and turning to Robert Harley. She had 12 miscarriages and 6 babies, but only one survived and he died at age 11, so her death ended the Stuart period. Anne's intimate friendship with Sarah Churchill turned sour in 1707 as the result of political differences. The Duchess took revenge in an unflattering description of the Queen in her memoirs as ignorant and easily led, which was a theme widely accepted by historians until Anne was re-assessed in the late 20th-century.

Anne took a lively interest in affairs of state, and was a noted patroness of theatre, poetry and music. She subsidised George Frideric Handel with £200 a year. She began the practice of awarding high-quality gold medals as rewards for outstanding political or military achievements. They were produced at the Mint by Isaac Newton and engraver John Croker.

==== Union with Scotland in 1707 ====
Scotland and England were entirely separate countries, having the same ruler since 1603. Queen Anne, ruling both countries, worked to bring them together in the Acts of Union 1707. Public opinion in Scotland was generally hostile, but elite opinion was supportive, especially after the English provided generous financial terms and timely bribes. The Parliament of Scotland agreed to the terms and disbanded. The new Parliament of Great Britain was in practice simply the old Parliament of England augmented by 45 Scots elected to Commons; it selected 16 Scottish peers for the House of Lords. Scotland was much smaller in terms of population and wealth. Its colonial venture in the Darien scheme had been a major financial and humanitarian disaster. The Acts of Union refunded the losses of the Scottish investors in Darien. In basic terms, Scotland retained its own Presbyterian established church, and its own legal and educational systems, as well it is its own separate nobility. The Scots now paid English taxes, although in reduced rates, and had a voice in the affairs of Great Britain.

The long-term economic benefits took a couple of generations to be realised, and long-standing distrust continued for generations. The risk of war between the two was greatly diminished, although Jacobite raids launched from the north hit England for another forty years. The new Britain used its power to undermine the clanship system in the Scottish Highlands Ambitious Scots now had major career opportunities in the fast-growing overseas British colonies, and in the rapidly growing industrial and financial communities of England. Scotland benefited, says historian G.N. Clark, gaining "freedom of trade with England and the colonies" as well as "a great expansion of markets." Clark argued that in exchange for the financial benefits and bribes that England bestowed, what it gained was:

of inestimable value. Scotland accepted the Hanoverian succession and gave up her power of threatening England's military security and complicating her commercial relations ... The sweeping successes of the eighteenth-century wars owed much to the new unity of the two nations.

By the time Samuel Johnson and James Boswell made their tour in 1773, recorded in A Journey to the Western Islands of Scotland, Johnson noted that Scotland was "a nation of which the commerce is hourly extending, and the wealth increasing" and in particular that Glasgow had become one of the greatest cities of Britain.

== Social and economic history ==
=== Population ===
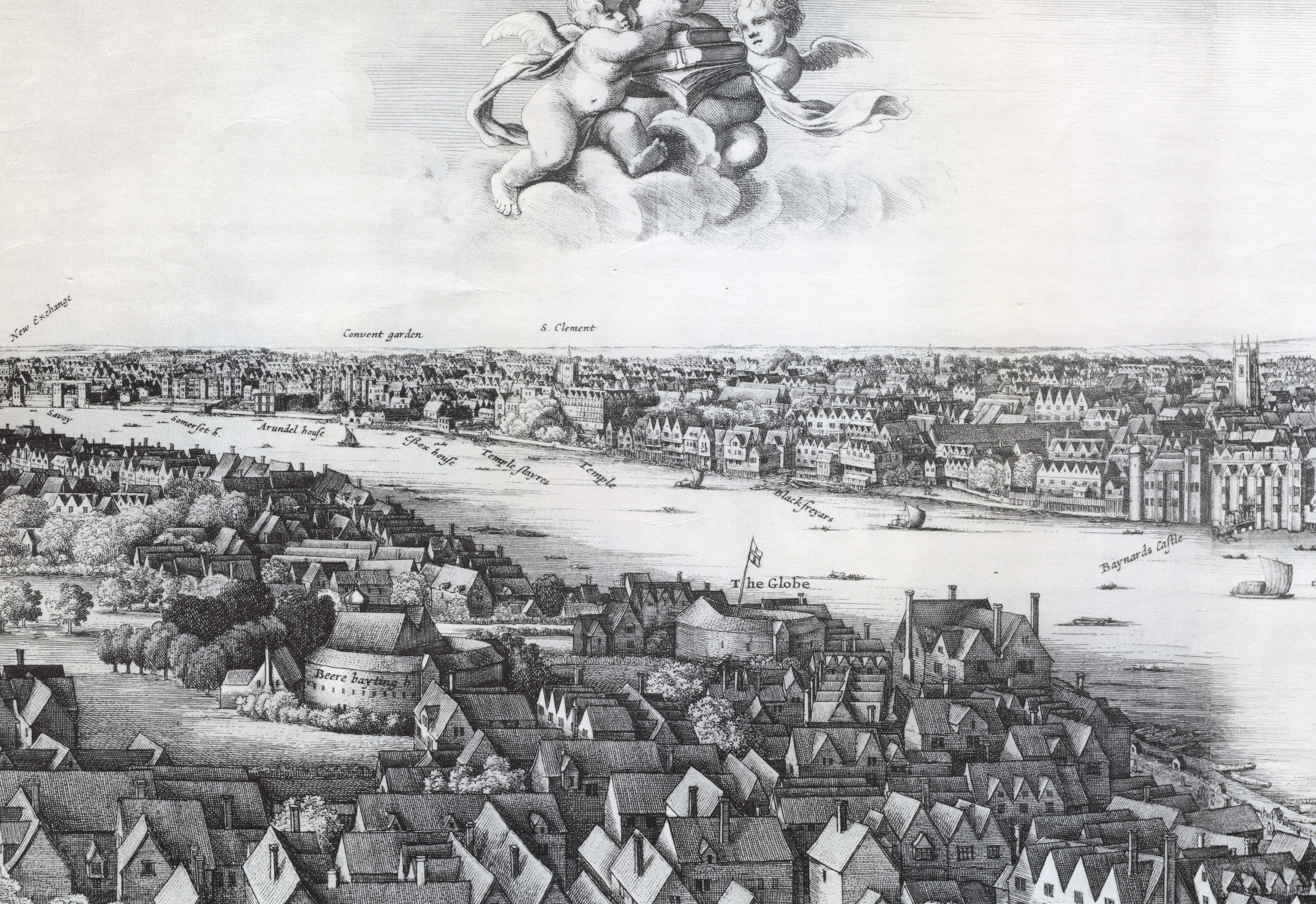
Long View of London from Bankside, detail from a 1647 drawing by Wenceslaus Hollar.

The total population of England grew steadily in the 17th century, from 1600 to about 1660, then declined slightly and stagnated between 1649 and 1714. The population was about 4.2 million in 1603, 5.2 million in 1649, 5.1 million in 1660, 4.9 million in 1688, and 5.3 million in 1714. By 1714 the Greater London area held about 674,000 people, or one in nine of England's population. The next cities in size were Norwich and Bristol (with a population of about 30,000 each). About 90% of the people lived in rural areas in 1500, compared to 80% of a much larger population in 1750.

=== Witchcraft and magic ===
Historians have recently placed stress on how people at the time dealt with the supernatural, not just in formal religious practice and theology, but in everyday life through magic and witchcraft. The persecution of witches began in England in 1563, and hundreds were executed. England was spared the frenzy on Continental Europe; with over 5% of Europe's population in 1600, England executed only 1% of the 40,000 witches killed in the period 1400–1800.

The government made witchcraft a capital crime under Queen Elizabeth I in 1563. King James VI and I made the suppression of witchcraft a high priority in both Scotland, and (in 1604) in England. Judges across England sharply increased their investigation of accused 'witches', thus generating a body of highly detailed local documentation that has provided the main basis for recent historical research on the topic. Historians Keith Thomas and his student Alan Macfarlane study witchcraft by combining historical research with concepts drawn from anthropology. They argued that English witchcraft was endemic year in and year out, rather than happening in epidemic outbursts. Older women were the favourite targets because they were marginal, dependent members of the community and therefore more likely to arouse feelings of both hostility and guilt, and less likely to have defenders of importance inside the community. Witchcraft accusations were the village's reaction to the breakdown of its internal community, coupled with the emergence of a newer set of values that was generating psychic stress.

Historian Peter Homer has emphasised the political basis of the witchcraft issue in the 17th century, with the Puritans taking the lead in rooting out the Devil's work in their attempt to depaganise England and build a godly community. As the process of psychological modernisation reached more and more people, fears of witchcraft and magic tended to steadily diminish. After 1660 Puritans were largely excluded from the judiciary and lost their power to investigate. In 1712, Jane Wenham was the last woman found guilty of witchcraft in England. In 1735 Parliament no longer believed that witchcraft was real—despite the efforts of James Erskine, Lord Grange, the Scottish Lord who made a fool of himself speaking in opposition. Parliament passed the Witchcraft Act 1735 which made it a crime to accuse someone of witchcraft. The laws against witchcraft were not fully repealed until 1951 with the passing of the Fraudulent Mediums Act 1951. Witchcraft was a minor issue of little importance in Ireland. However, Scotland was a major centre of suppression; 3900 Scots were tried; two thirds were convicted and executed, the last of whom was Janet Horne in 1727.

=== Education ===
There was no free schooling for ordinary children, but in the towns and cities small local private schools were opened for the benefit of the boys of the middle classes, and a few were opened for girls. The rich and the nobility relied on private tutors. Private schools were starting to open for young men of the upper classes, and universities operated in Scotland and England. The University of Oxford and the University of Cambridge provided some education for prospective Anglican ministers.

Historians have looked at local documents to see how many men and women used their signature and how many used X's. Literacy rates were very low before 1500, but grew steadily in the next three centuries, with men twice as likely to be literate as comparable women. In 1500, literacy rates for women were 1%; by 1560 they had reached 5%; by 1640 about 10%; by 1710 about 25% (versus 50% for men). Two forces were at work: Protestant religion called for the ability to read the Bible, and changing social and economic conditions. For example, towns grew rapidly, providing jobs in retailing in which literacy was a distinct advantage.

=== Popular culture ===
Refinement meets burlesque in Restoration comedy. In this scene from George Etherege's Love in a Tub, musicians and well-bred ladies surround a man who is wearing a tub because he has lost his trousers.

When the Puritans fell out of power, the tight social norms gave way to more liberal pleasures. The theatres returned, and played a major role in high society in London, where they were patronised by royalty. Historian George Clark argues:

The best-known fact about the Restoration drama is that it is immoral. The dramatists did not criticise the accepted morality about gambling, drink, love, and pleasure generally, or try, like the dramatists of our own time, to work out their own view of character and conduct. What they did was, according to their respective inclinations, to mock at all restraints. Some were gross, others delicately improper ... The dramatists did not merely say anything they liked: they also intended to glory in it and to shock those who did not like it.

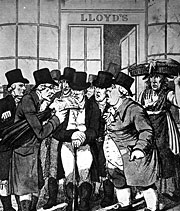
A 19th century imaginative drawing of Lloyd's Coffee House

The first coffee houses appeared in the mid-1650s and quickly became established in every city in many small towns. They exemplified the emerging standards of middle-class masculine civility and politeness. Downtown London boasted about 600 by 1708. Admission was a penny for as long as a customer wanted. The customers could buy coffee, and perhaps tea and chocolate, as well as sandwiches and knickknacks. Recent newspapers and magazines could be perused by middle-class men with leisure time on their hands. Widows were often the proprietors. The coffeehouses were quiet escapes, suitable for conversation, and free of noise, disorder, shouting and fighting in drinking places. The working class could more usually be found drinking in pubs, or playing dice in the alleyways.

Many businessmen conducted their affairs there, and some even kept scheduled hours. Historian Mark Pendergast observes:

Each coffeehouse specialised in a different type of clientele. In one, physicians could be consulted. Others served Protestants, Puritans, Catholics, Jews, literati, merchants, traders, fops, Whigs, Tories, army officers, actors, lawyers, clergy, or wits. The coffeehouses provided England's first egalitarian meeting place, where a man was expected to chat with his tablemates whether he knew them or not.

Lloyd's Coffee House opened in 1686 and specialised in providing shipping news for a clientele of merchants, insurers, and shipowners. In a few years it moved to a private business office that eventually became the famous insurance exchange Lloyd's of London. By the 1790s private clubs had become more popular and the penny coffee houses largely closed down.

=== High culture ===
In science, the Royal Society was formed in 1660; it sponsored and legitimised a renaissance of major discoveries, led most notably by Isaac Newton, Robert Boyle and Robert Hooke. New scientific discoveries were made during this period, such as the laws of gravity and motion, Boyle's law and microscopy among many others.

The period also witnessed the growth of a culture of political news and commentary on political events. This was engaged in by both elites and laypeople, often involving a critical view or "skeptical reading".

The custom of the Grand Tour – where upper-class Englishman travelled to Italy – were a largely 18th century phenomenon. However, it originated in the 17th century with some of the earliest precedents set by Thomas Howard when he travelled to Italy in 1613. The travelogue Coryat's Crudities (1611), published by Thomas Coryat was also an early influence on the Grand Tour. The first mention of the term can be found in Richard Lassels' 17th century book The Voyage of Italy. The Grand Tour experienced considerable development after 1630.

=== Architecture ===
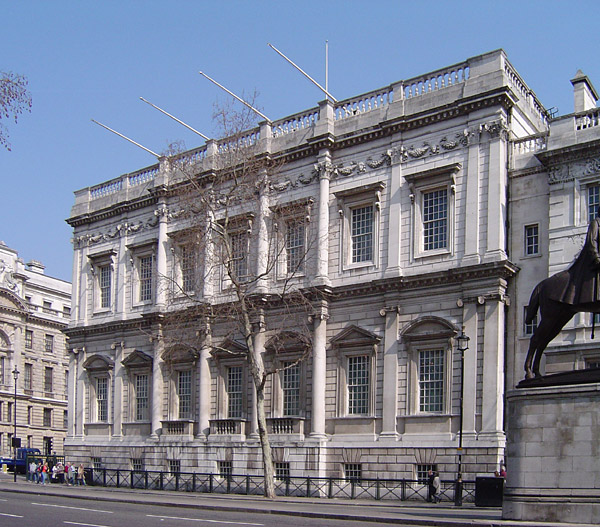
The Banqueting House, Whitehall

Out in the countryside, numerous architects built country houses – the more magnificent the better, for the nobility and the wealthier gentry. Inigo Jones, one of the most well-known of Stuart-era architects built the magnificent Banqueting House in Whitehall, London in 1622. Numerous architects worked on the decorative arts, designing intricate wainscoted rooms, staircases, lush carpets, furniture, and clocks in country houses open to tourism.

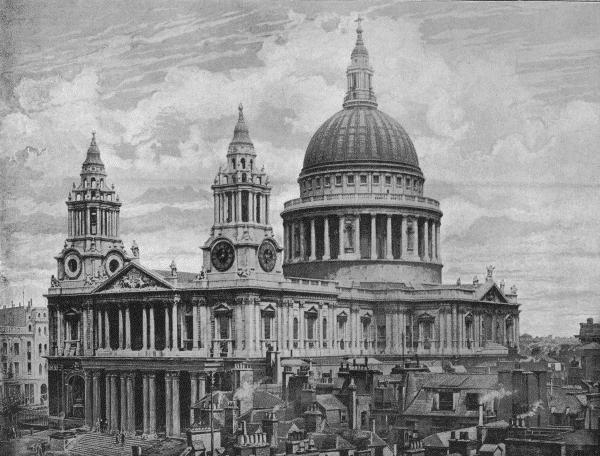
St Paul's Cathedral by Christopher Wren

The Great Fire of London in 1666 created the urgent necessity to rebuild many important buildings and stately houses. The accompanying act regulated buildings of a certain material (preferably of brick or stone), wall thickness and street widths while jetties were banned. Sir Christopher Wren was in charge of the rebuilding damaged churches. More than 50 City churches are attributable to Wren. His greatest achievement was St Paul's Cathedral.

=== Localism and transport ===
Historians have always emphasised the localism in rural England, with readers gaining the impression that the little villages were self-contained communities. However, Charles Phythian-Adams has used local evidence to paint a much more complex picture. Data from the location of brides and grooms, the sources of financial credit, and patterns of migration indicate that each village was embedded in a network of villages and transportation routes. People could relocate from one village to another inside these networks without feeling like they were strangers. The network would include for example one or more market towns, county centres, or small cities. Roads existed and were supplemented by turnpikes. However the chief means of transportation was typically by water, since it was much cheaper to move wagon loads of commodities, especially wool and cloth, by boat than over land. Much effort was made to improve the river system, by removing obstacles. A mania to build canals, 1790–1840, enlarged the range and lowered costs. After 1840, the coming of railroads enlarged the range of local networks so much that the localism was overwhelmed

=== World trade ===
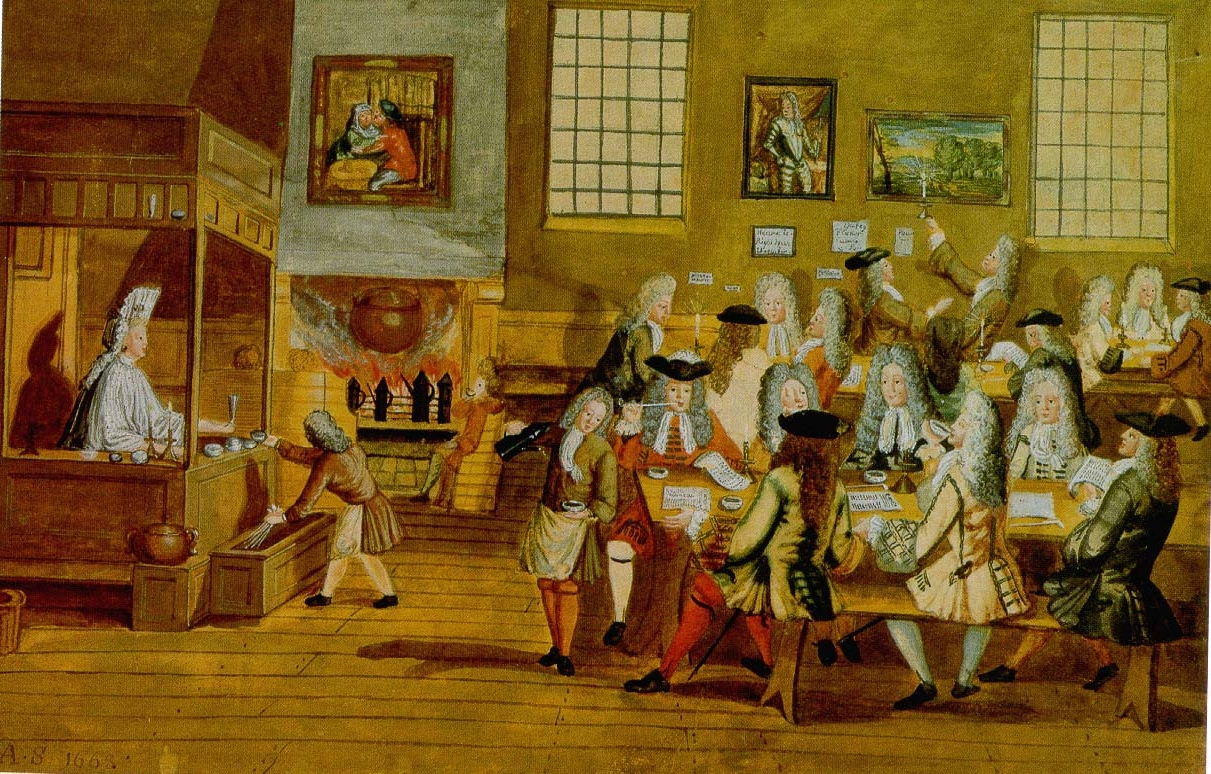
Interior of a London coffeehouse, 17th century

The 18th century was prosperous as entrepreneurs extended the range of their businesses around the globe. By the 1720s Britain was one of the most prosperous countries in the world, Daniel Defoe boasted:

we are the most "diligent nation in the world. Vast trade, rich manufactures, mighty wealth, universal correspondence, and happy success have been constant companions of England, and given us the title of an industrious people."

As an island there was little incentive for gaining new territory. In the Tudor and Stuart periods the main foreign policy goal (besides protecting the homeland from invasion) was the building a worldwide trading network for its merchants, manufacturers, shippers and financiers. This required a hegemonic Royal Navy so powerful that no rival could sweep its ships from the world's trading routes, or invade the British Isles. Wool was the great commercial product. Home production of wool supplied internal needs, while raw wool and wool cloth made up 75–90% of exports. Trade was extensive with France, the Low Countries, and the Baltic. The Hanseatic League of German trading cities had once controlled 40% of the English trade, but it rapidly lost that role after 1500 and was expelled from England in 1598. The English colonies in the West Indies provided sugar, most of which was re-exported to the Continent. The 13 American colonies provided land for migrants, masts for the navy, food for the West Indies slaves, and tobacco for the home and the re-export trades. The British gained dominance in the trade with India, and largely dominated the highly lucrative slave, sugar, and commercial trades originating in West Africa and the West Indies. Exports were stable at £2.5 million from 1613 to 1669, then soared £6.5 million in 1700, to £14.7 million in 1760 and £43.2 million in 1800.

The government supported the private sector by incorporating numerous privately financed London-based companies for establishing trading posts and opening import-export businesses across the world. Each was given a monopoly of trade to the specified geographical region. The first enterprise was the Muscovy Company set up in 1555 to trade with Russia. Other prominent enterprises included he East India Company (1599), and the Hudson's Bay Company (1670) in Canada. The Company of Royal Adventurers Trading to Africa had been set up in 1662 to trade in gold, ivory and slaves in Africa; it was reestablished as the Royal African Company in 1672 and focused on the slave trade. Other powers set up similar monopolies on a much smaller scale; only the Netherlands emphasised trade as much as England.

==== Wool trade ====
Woolen cloth was the chief export and most important employer after agriculture. The golden era of the Wiltshire woolen industry was in the reign of Henry VIII. In the medieval period, raw wool had been exported, but now England had an industry, based on its 11 million sheep. London and towns purchased wool from dealers, and send it to rural households where family labour turned it into cloth. They washed the wool, carded it and spun it into thread, which was then turned into cloth on a loom. Export merchants, known as Merchant Adventurers, exported woolens into the Netherlands and Germany, as well as other lands. The arrival of Huguenots from France brought in new skills that expanded the industry.

Government intervention proved a disaster in the early 17th century. A new company convinced Parliament to transfer to them the monopoly held by the old, well-established Company of Merchant Adventurers. Arguing that the export of unfinished cloth was much less profitable than the export of the finished product, the new company got Parliament to ban the export of unfinished cloth. There was massive dislocation marketplace, as large unsold quantities built up, prices fell, and unemployment rose. Worst of all, the Dutch retaliated and refused to import any finished cloth from England. Exports fell by a third. Quickly the ban was lifted, and the Merchant Adventurers got its monopoly back. However, the trade losses became permanent.

== Foreign policy ==
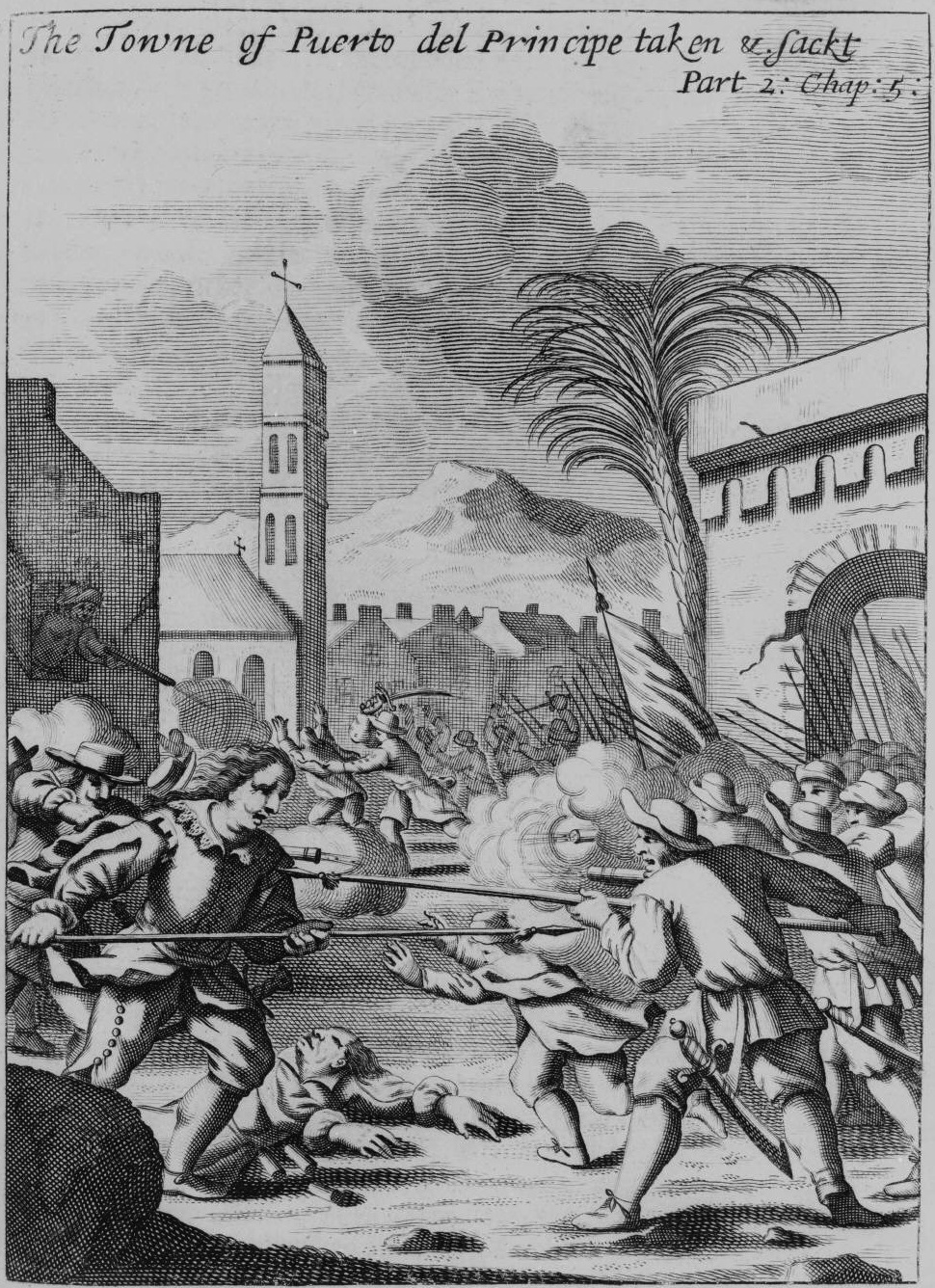
Spanish town of Puerto del Príncipe being sacked in 1668 by Henry Morgan

Stuart England was primarily consumed with internal affairs. King James I (reigned 1603–25) was sincerely devoted to peace, not just for his three kingdoms of England, Scotland and Ireland, but for Europe as a whole. He disliked Puritans and Jesuits alike, because of their eagerness for warfare. He called himself "Rex Pacificus" ("King of peace.") At the time, Europe was deeply polarised, and on the verge of the massive Thirty Years' War (1618–1648), with the smaller established Protestant states facing the aggression of the larger Catholic empires. On assuming the throne, James made peace with Catholic Spain, and made it his policy to marry his son to the Spanish Infanta (princess) Maria Anna in the "Spanish Match". The marriage of James' daughter Princess Elizabeth to Elector Frederick V of the Palatinate on 14 February 1613 was more than the social event of the era; the couple's union had important political and military implications. Across Europe, the German princes were banding together in the Protestant Union, headquartered in Heidelberg, the capital of the Electoral Palatinate. King James calculated that his daughter's marriage would give him diplomatic leverage among the Protestants. He thus planned to have a foot in both camps and be able to broker peaceful settlements. In his naïveté, he did not realise that both sides were playing him as a tool for their own goal of achieving the destruction of the other side. Spain's ambassador Diego Sarmiento de Acuña, 1st Count of Gondomar knew how to manipulate the king. The Catholics in Spain, as well as the Emperor Ferdinand II, the Vienna-based leader of the Habsburgs and head of the Holy Roman Empire, were both heavily influenced by the Catholic Counter-Reformation. They had the goal of expelling Protestantism from their domains.

Lord Buckingham in the 1620s wanted an alliance with Spain. Buckingham took Charles with him to Spain to woo the Infanta in 1623. However, Spain's terms were that James must drop Britain's anti-Catholic intolerance or there would be no marriage. Buckingham and Charles were humiliated and Buckingham became the leader of the widespread British demand for a war against Spain. Meanwhile, the Protestant princes looked to Britain, since it was the strongest of all the Protestant countries, to provide them with military support for their cause. James' son-in-law and daughter became king and queen of Bohemia, an event which outraged Vienna. The Thirty Years' War began, as the Habsburg Emperor ousted the new king and queen of the Kingdom of Bohemia, and massacred their followers. The Catholic Duchy of Bavaria then invaded the Electoral Palatinate, and James's son-in-law begged for James's military intervention. James finally realised that his policies had backfired and refused these pleas. He successfully kept Britain out of the European-wide war that proved so heavily devastating for three decades. James's backup plan was to marry his son Charles to a French Catholic princess, who would bring a handsome dowry. Parliament and the British people were strongly opposed to any Catholic marriage, were demanding immediate war with Spain, and strongly favoured the Protestant cause in Europe. James had alienated both elite and popular opinion in Britain, and Parliament was cutting back its financing. Historians credit James for pulling back from a major war at the last minute, and keeping Britain in peace.

Frederick's election as King of Bohemia in 1619 deepened the Thirty Years' War—a conflagration that destroyed millions of lives in central Europe, but only barely touched Britain. The intense hatred and rivalry of Catholic versus Protestant princes was the main cause. King James' determination to avoid involvement in the continental conflict, even during the "war fever" of 1623, was one of the most significant, and most positive, aspects of his reign.

During 1600–1650 the kings made repeated efforts to colonise Guiana in South America. They all failed and the lands (Suriname) were ceded to the Dutch Republic in 1667.

=== Anglo-Dutch Wars ===
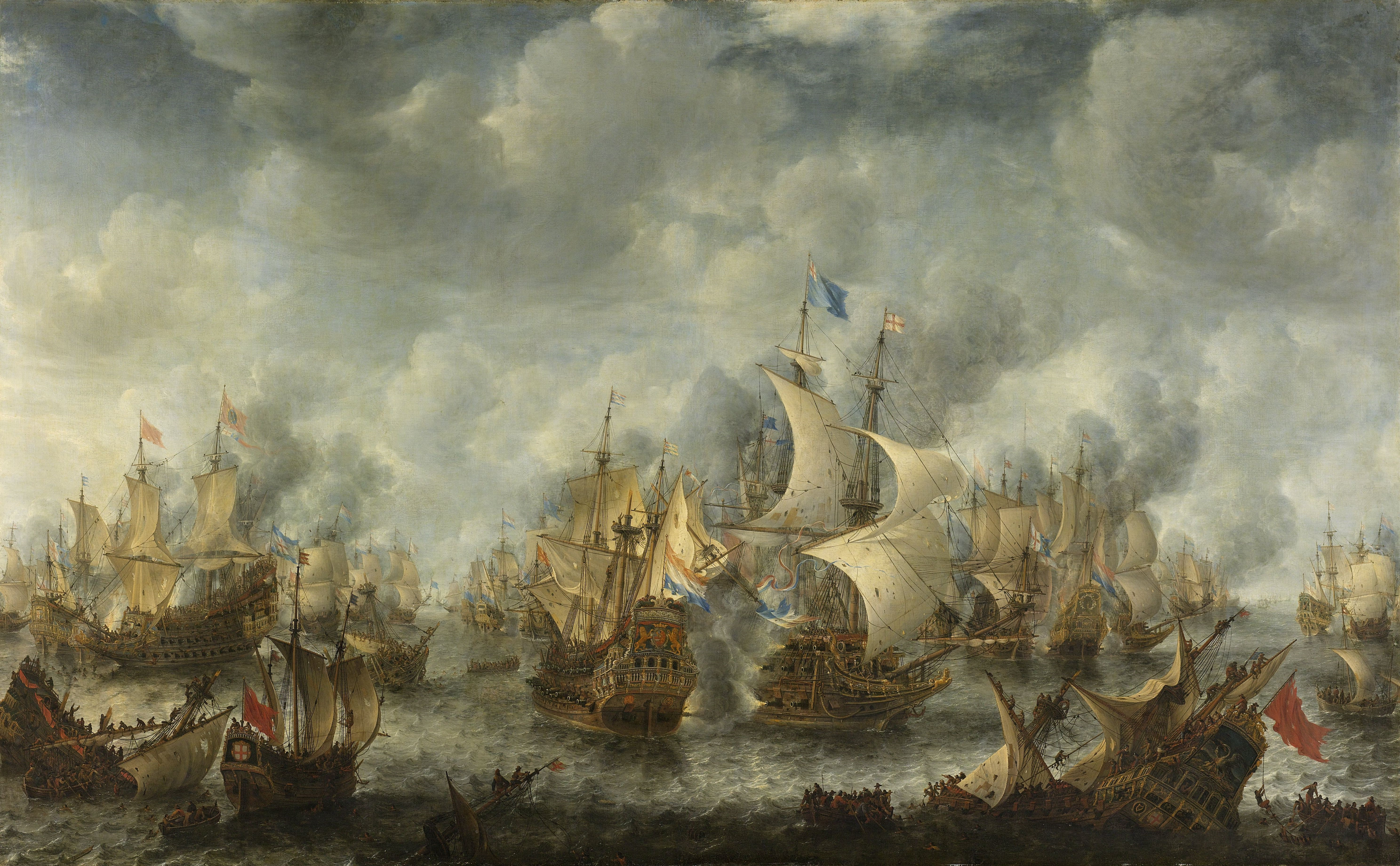
The Battle of Scheveningen in 1653 was the final battle of the First Anglo-Dutch War.

The Anglo-Dutch Wars were a series of three wars which took place between the English and the Dutch from 1652 to 1674. The causes included political disputes and increasing competition from merchant shipping. Religion was not a factor, since both sides were Protestant. The British in the First Anglo-Dutch War (1652–54) had the naval advantage with larger numbers of more powerful "ships of the line" which were well suited to the naval tactics of the era. The British also captured numerous Dutch merchant ships.

In the Second Anglo-Dutch War (1665–67) Dutch naval victories followed. This second war cost London ten times more than it had planned on, and the king sued for peace in 1667 with the Treaty of Breda. It ended the fights over "mercantilism" (that is, the use of force to protect and expand national trade, industry, and shipping.) Meanwhile, the French were building up fleets that threatened both the Netherlands and Great Britain.

In the Third Anglo-Dutch War (1672–74), the British counted on a new alliance with France but the outnumbered Dutch outsailed both of them, and King Charles II ran short of money and political support. The Dutch gained domination of sea trading routes until 1713. The British gained the thriving colony of New Netherland, which was renamed as the Province of New York.

== Timeline ==
The Stuart period began in 1603 with the death of Queen Elizabeth I and the accession of King James I. There was a break in the middle but the Stuarts were restored to the throne in 1660. It ended in 1714 (after 111 years) with the death of Queen Anne and the accession of King George I, the first king of the House of Hanover. The yellow bars show Stuart rule.

Jacobean era (1603–1625)
Caroline era (1625–1642)
English Civil War (1642–1651)
British Interregnum (1649-1660)
Restoration (1660–1688)
Post-Restoration (1688–1702)
│
1603
│
1613
│
1623
│
1633
│
1643
│
1653
│
1663
│
1673
│
1683
│
1693
│
1703
│
1713

== Monarchs ==
The House of Stuart produced six monarchs who ruled during this period.

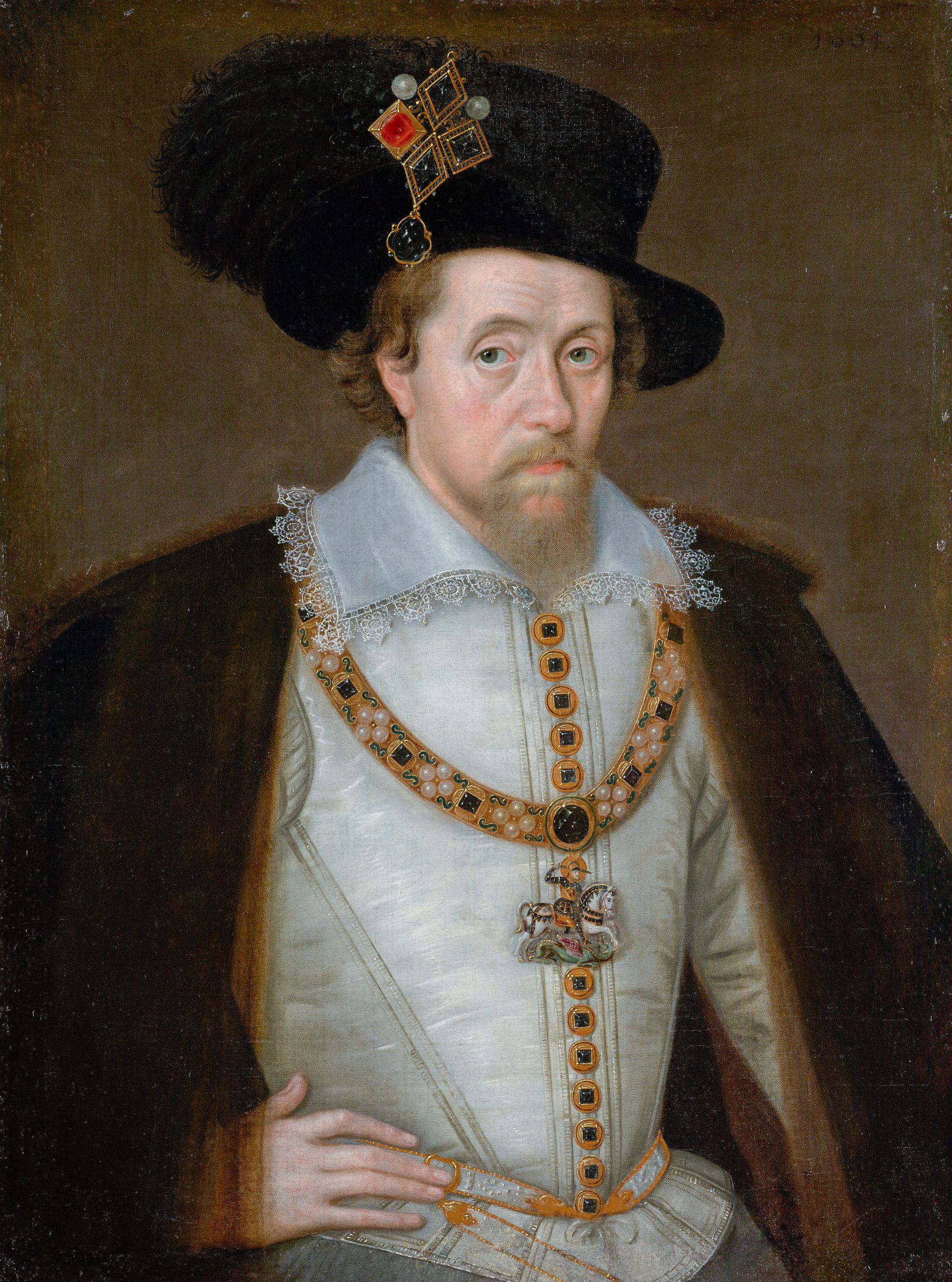
James I
(1603–1625)

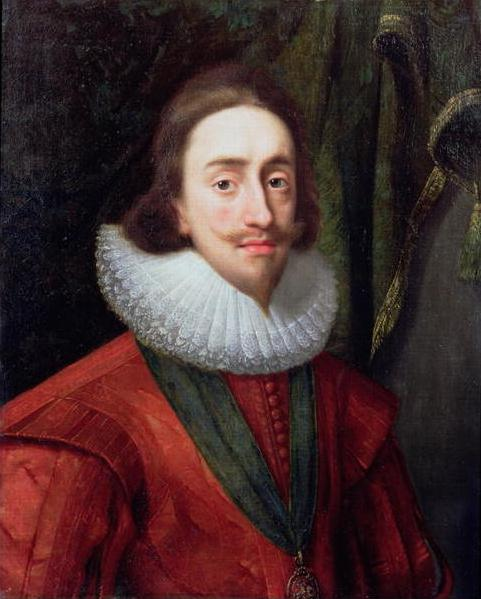
Charles I
(1625–1649)

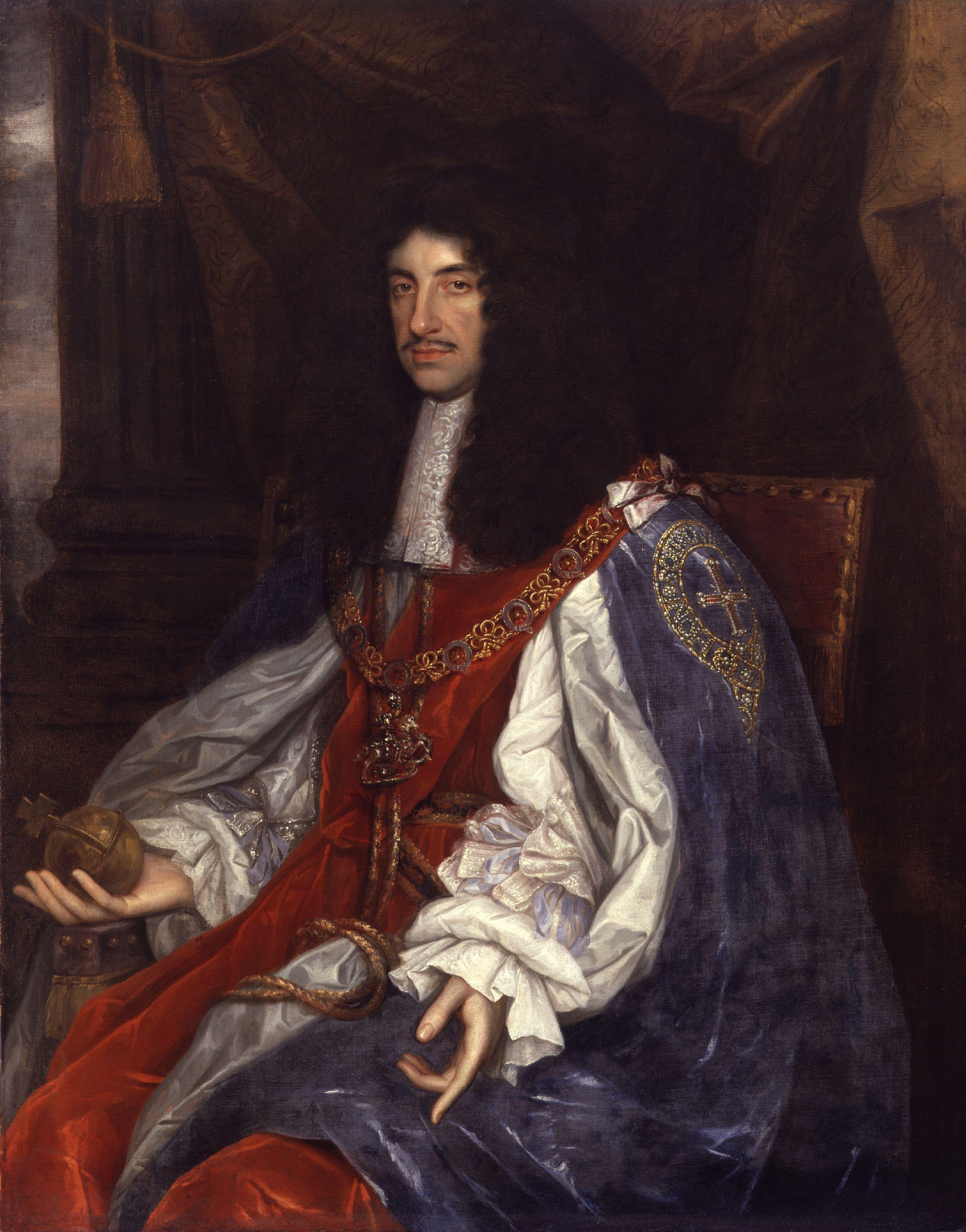
Charles II
(1660–1685)

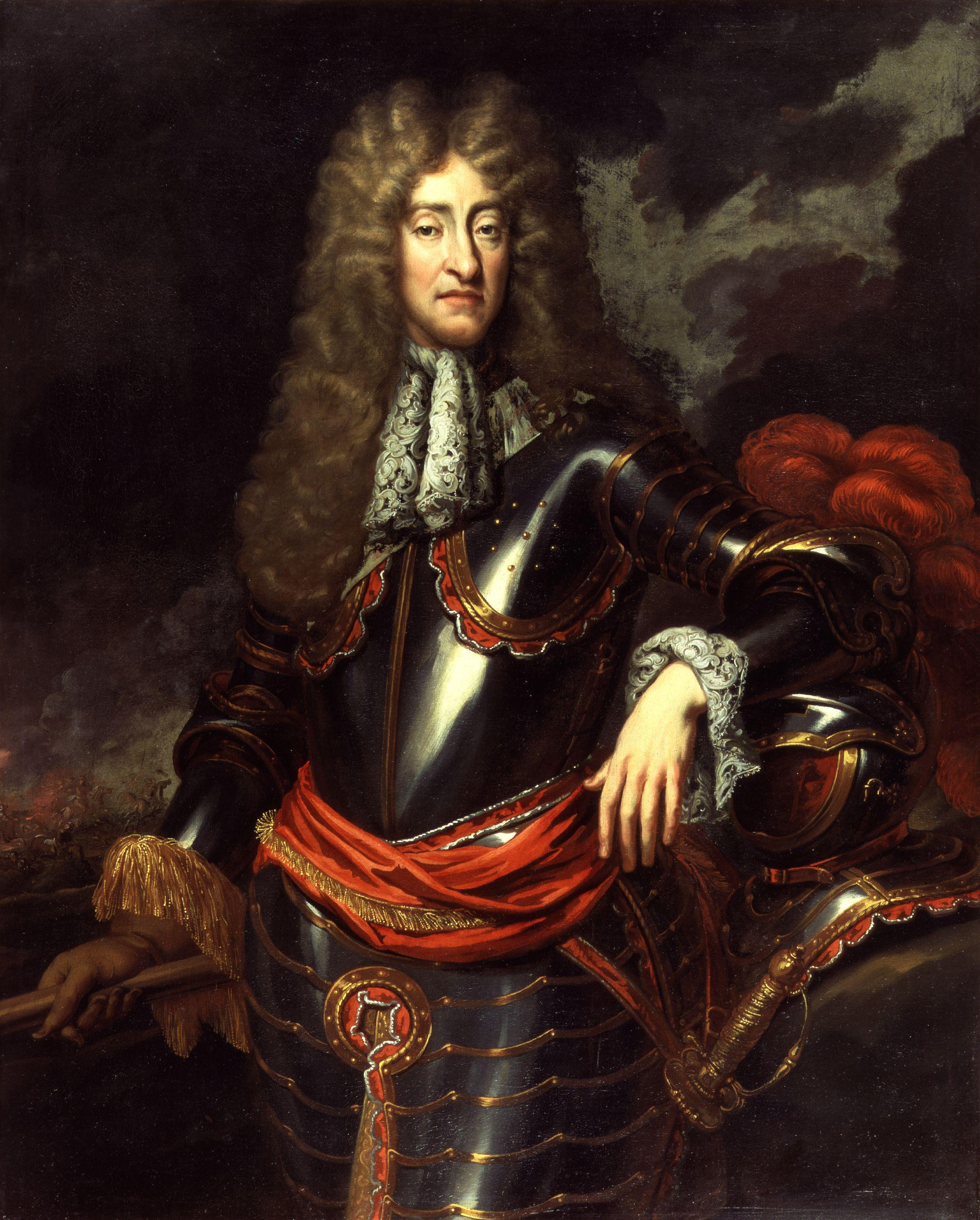
James II
(1685–1688)

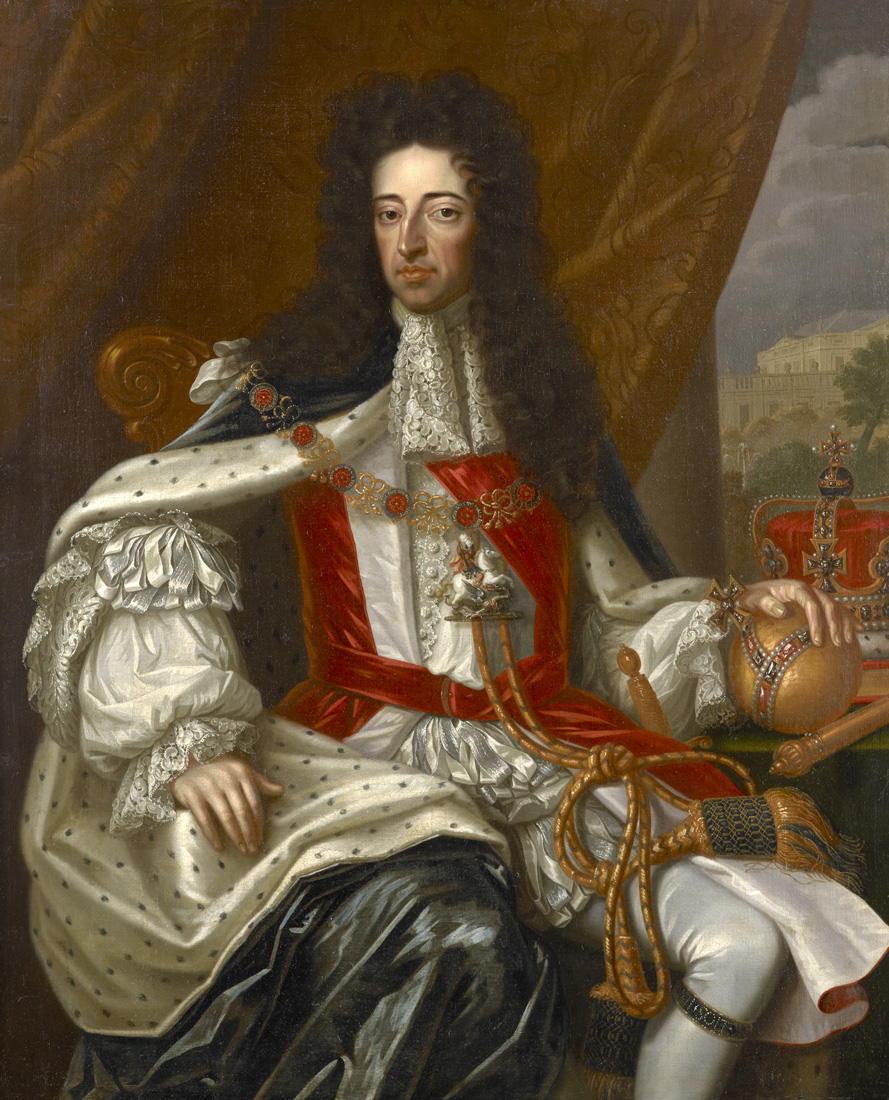
William III
(1689–1702)

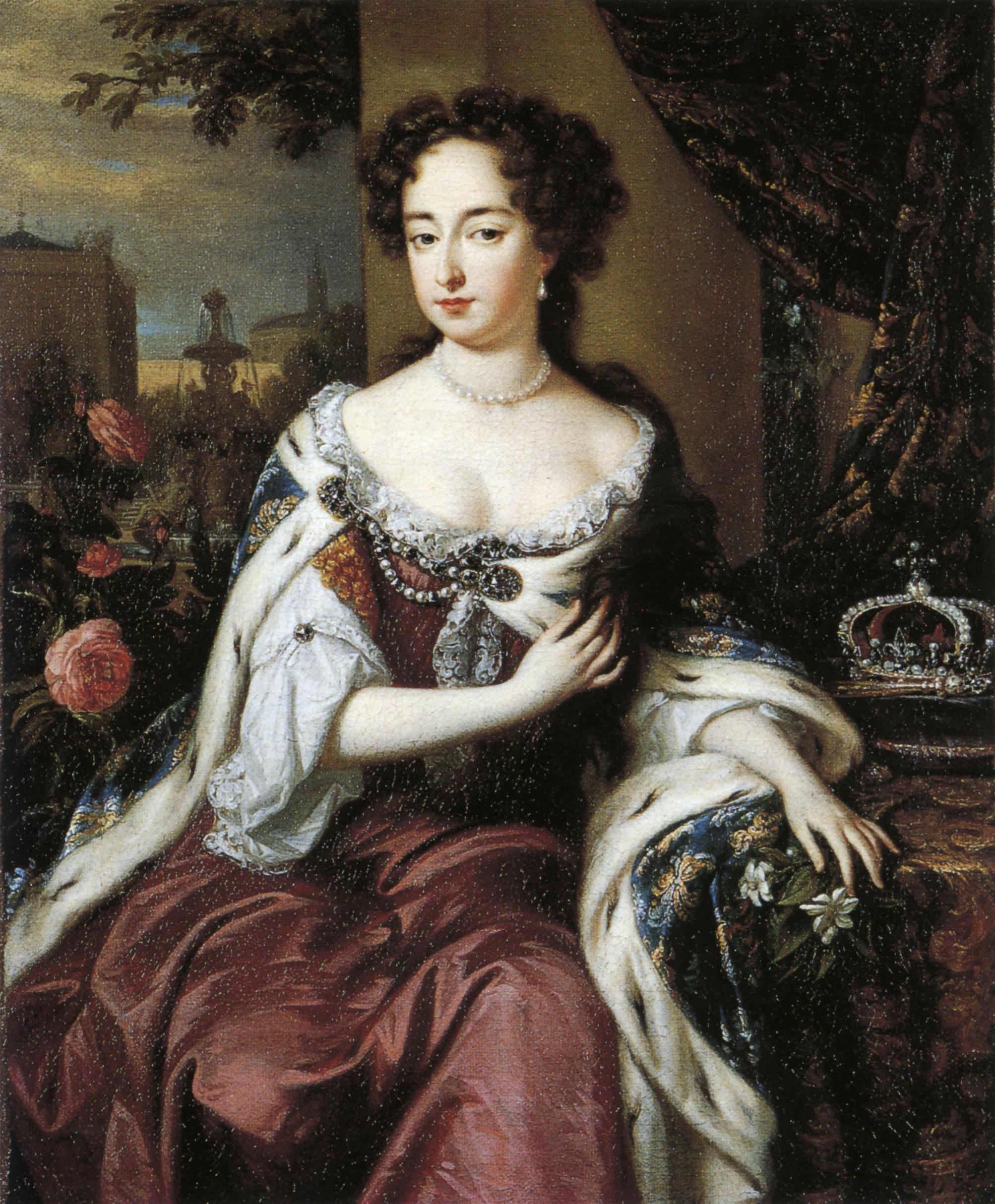
Mary II
(1689–1694)

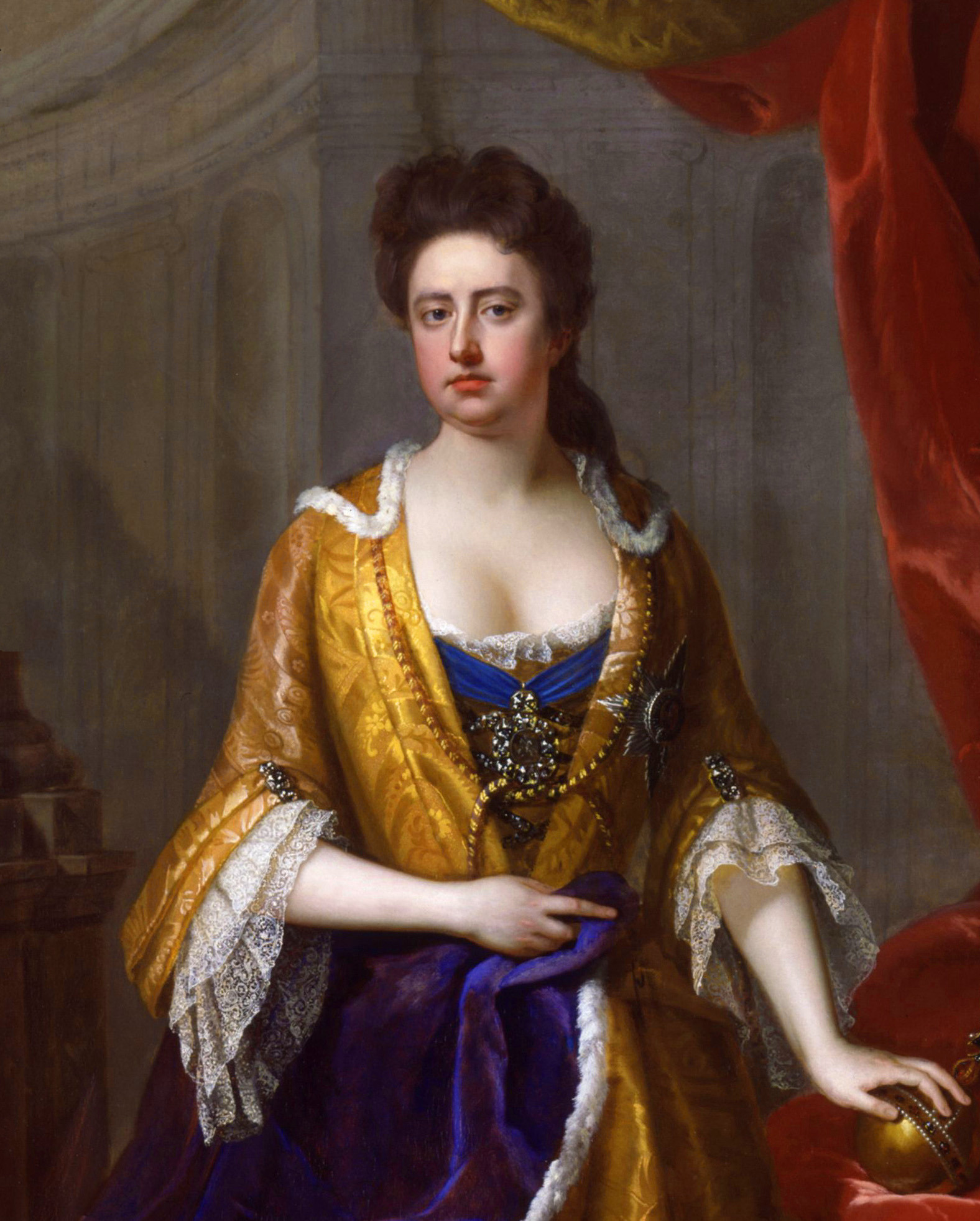
Anne
(1702–1714)

== Historical gallery ==
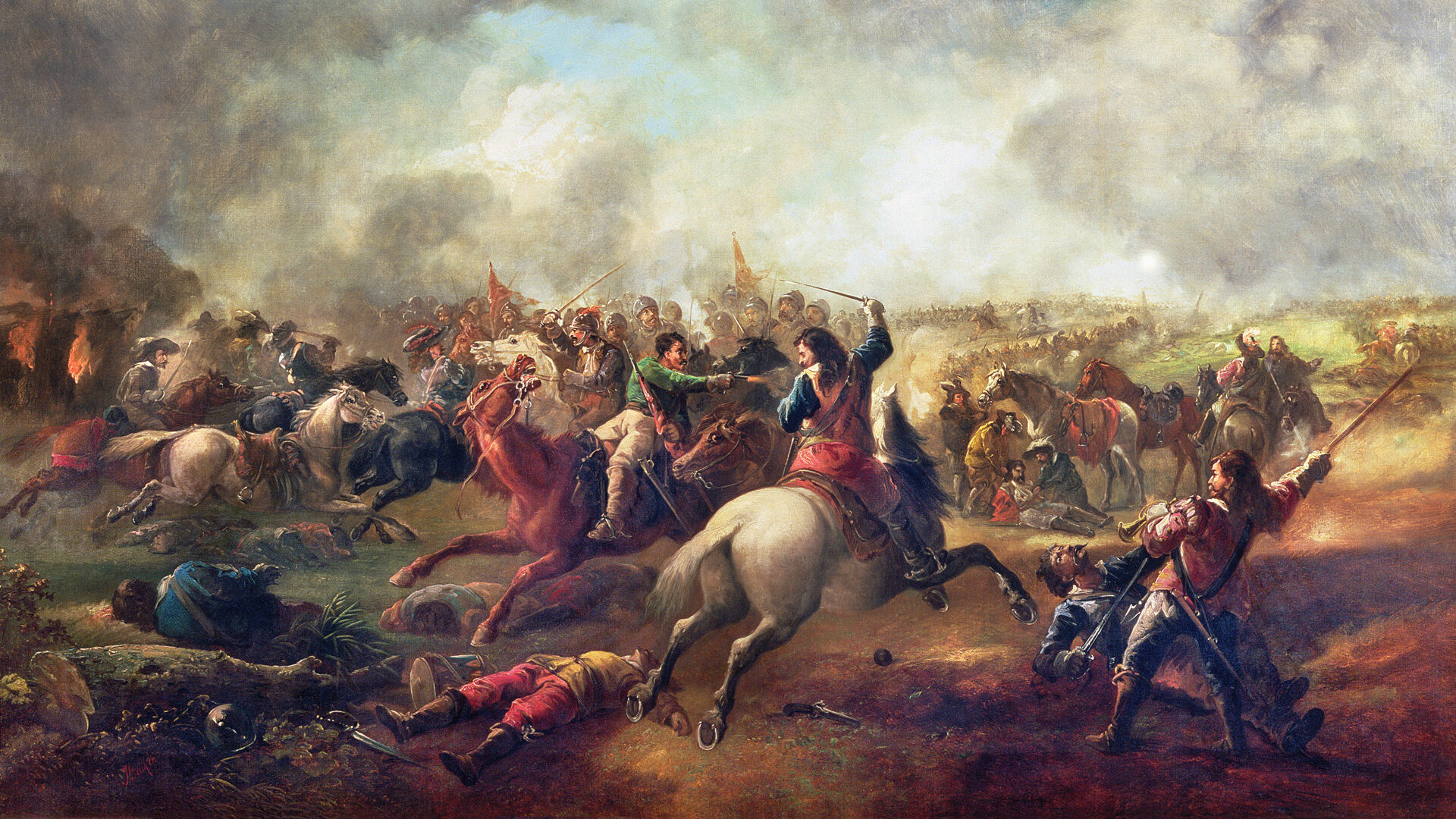
Battle of Marston Moor

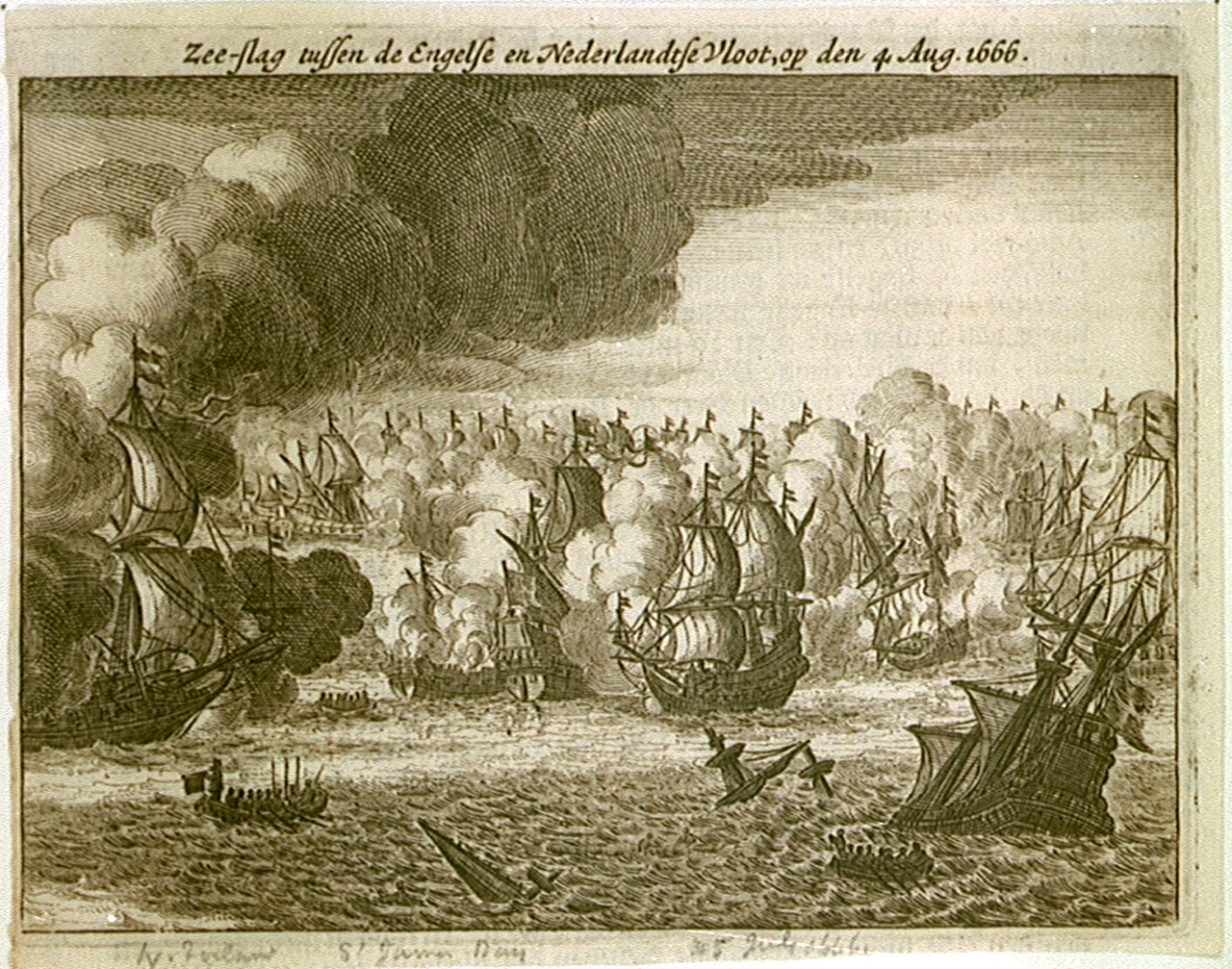
St. James's Day Battle

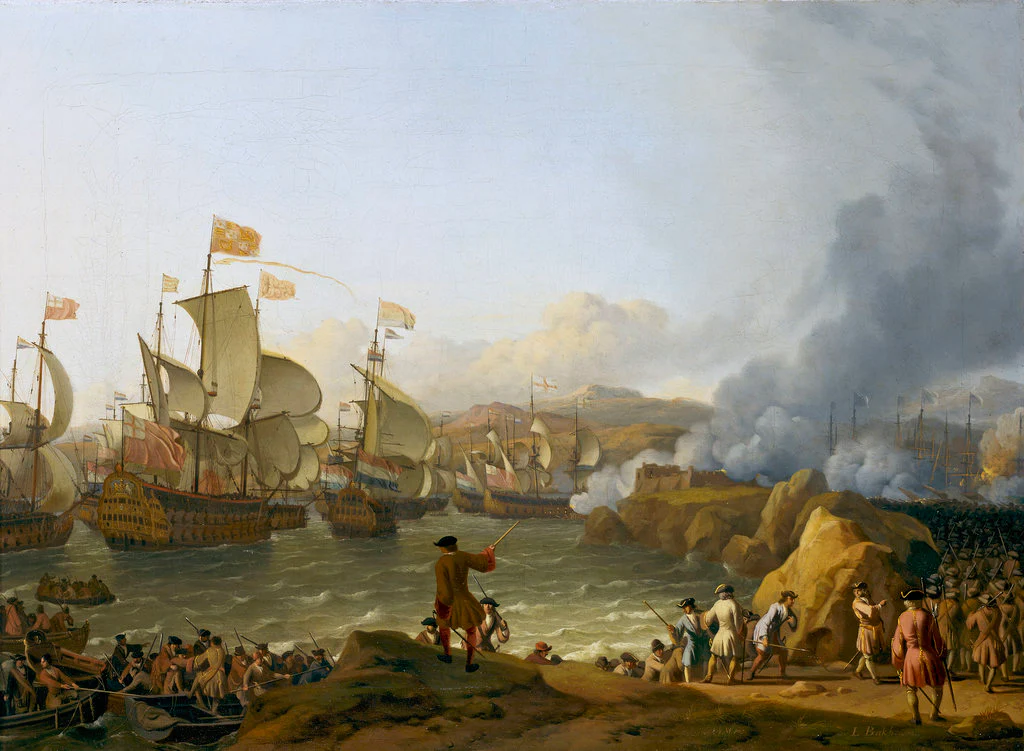
Battle of Vigo Bay

Royal house House of Stuart
| Preceded by House of Bruce | Ruling house of the Kingdom of Scotland; 1371–1649 | Vacant The Covenanters |
| Preceded by House of Tudor | Ruling house of the Kingdom of England; 1603–1649 | Vacant Commonwealth of England |
| Vacant The Covenanters | Ruling house of the Kingdom of Scotland; 1660–1707 | Titles merged by the Acts of Union 1707 |
| Vacant Commonwealth of England | Ruling house of the Kingdom of England; 1660–1707 | Titles merged by the Acts of Union 1707 |
| New title England and Scotland united | Ruling house of the Kingdom of Great Britain; 1606–1714 | Succeeded by House of Hanover |
