= The Eve of the Battle of Edgehill =

Painting by Charles Landseer

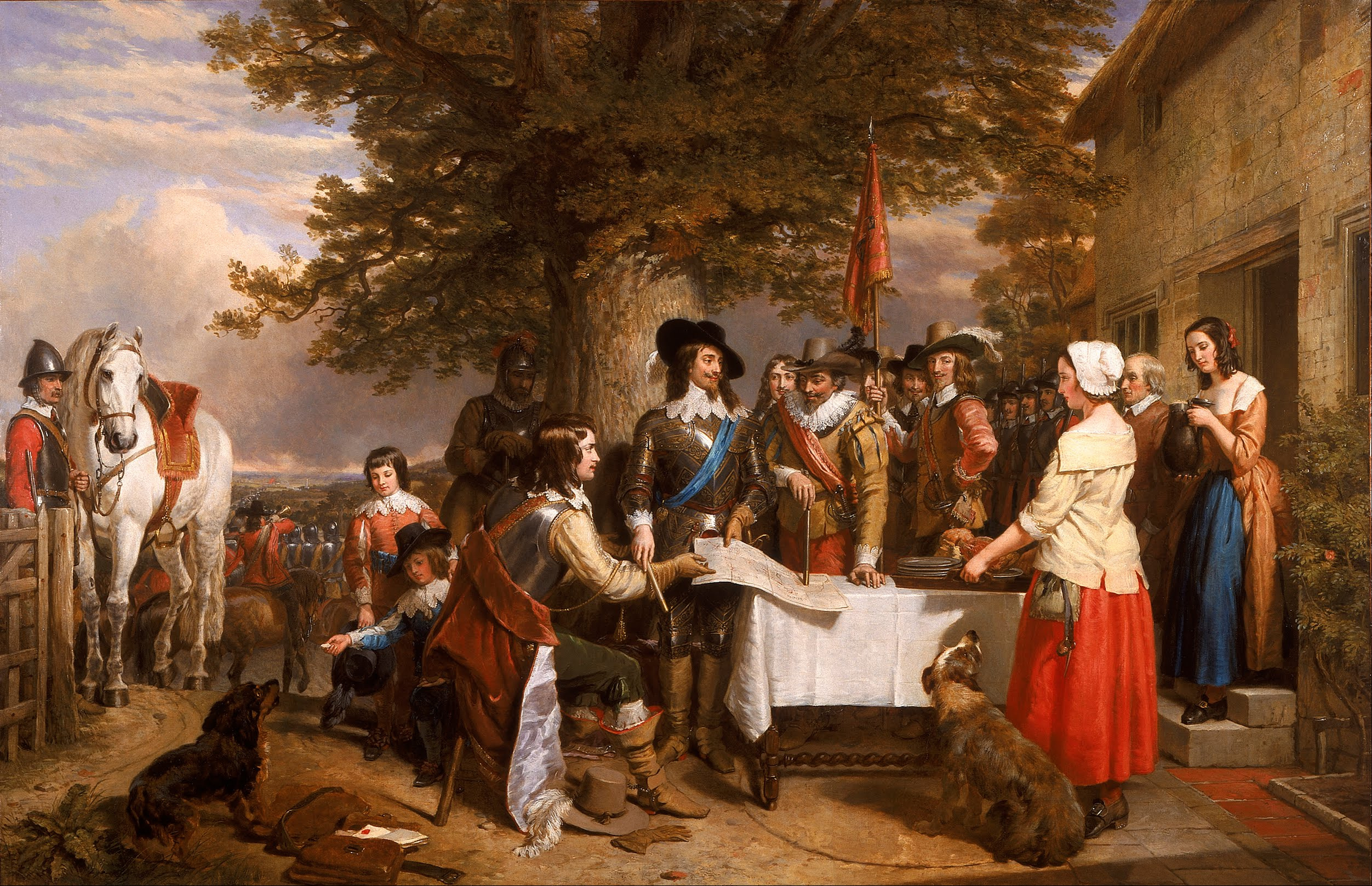
- Artist: Charles Landseer
- Year: 1845
- Type: Oil on canvas, history painting
- Dimensions: 55.51 cm × 84.13 cm (21.85 in × 33.12 in)
- Location: Walker Art Gallery, Liverpool

The Eve of the Battle of Edgehill is an 1845 history painting by the British artist Charles Landseer. It depicts a council of war being held in the Royalist camp the evening before the Battle of Edgehill in Warwickshire during the early stages of the English Civil War. The battle, fought on the 23 October 1642 was a victory of the Royalists over their Parliamentarian opponents. Charles I then led his army on the capital London but their attempt was thwarted at the Battle of Turnham Green, with the victory of Edgehill and its aftermath marking a high watermark of the Royalist cause. After his defeat in the war, Charles was executed in London in 1649.

A number of key figures are depicted. King Charles stands in the centre, wearing the blue sash of the Order of the Garter. Lord Lindsey stands to his right him gesturing at the map with his baton. The standard bearer behind them is Edmund Verney. Seated, to the King's left, is Prince Rupert of the Rhine who became a noted cavalry commander. Behind him are the king's two eldest sons the Prince of Wales and Duke of York (both of whom would later reign as monarchs as Charles II and James II respectively).

Charles Landseer, a member of the Royal Academy, was the elder brother of the better-known Edwin Landseer. Today the painting is in the collection of the Walker Art Gallery in Liverpool, having been purchased in 1885. In 1851, Landseer produced Cromwell at the Battle of Naseby a painting of Oliver Cromwell at the Battle of Naseby, now in the Alte Nationalgalerie in Berlin.

== Bibliography ==
- Callen, Anthea. Looking at Men: Anatomy, Masculinity and the Modern Male Body. Yale University Press, 2018.
- McClean, Daniel . Dear Images: Art, Copyright and Culture. Ridinghouse, 2002
- Morris, Edward & Milner, Frank. And when Did You Last See Your Father?. National Museums & Galleries on Merseyside, 1992.
- Schwartzwald, Jack L. The Rise of the Nation-State in Europe: Absolutism, Enlightenment and Revolution, 1603-1815. McFarland, 2017.
