= The King's Cabinet Opened =

1645 Parliamentarian pamphlet publishing the private letters of Charles I

- Title page of the 1645 pamphlet
- Author: Charles I (letters); edited/annotated by Henry Parker, John Sadler, and Thomas May
- Language: English
- Subject: First English Civil War
- Genre: Political pamphlet; propaganda
- Publisher: Printed for Robert Bostock, Paul’s Churchyard, London
- Publication date: 1645
- Publication place: England
- Media type: Print (quarto)
- Pages: 56

The King's Cabinet Opened was a political pamphlet published by the Parliamentarians in 1645 during the First English Civil War. It contained a collection of King Charles I’s private correspondence, captured after the Battle of Naseby on 14 June 1645.

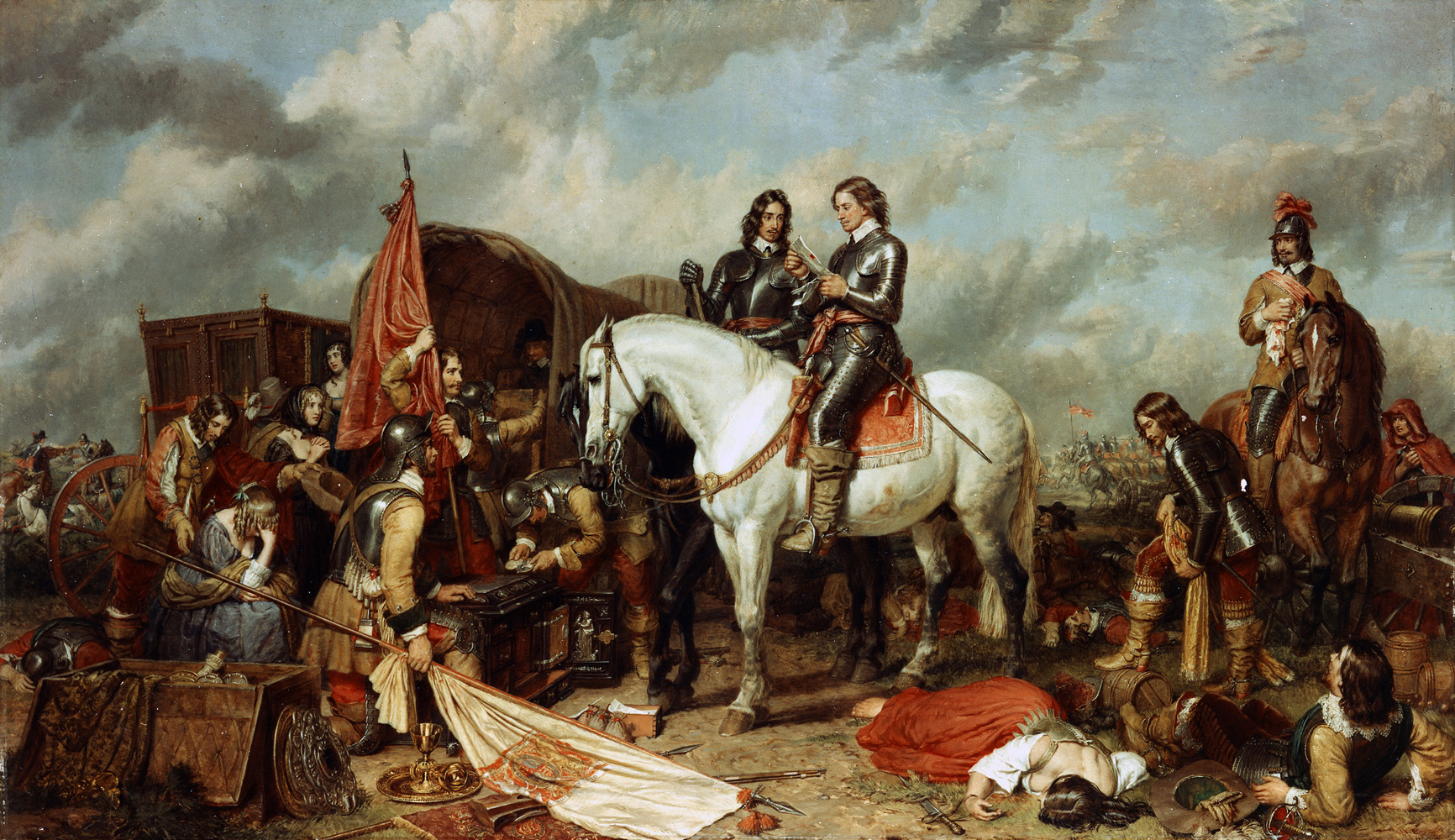
Cromwell at the Battle of Naseby by Charles Landseer, 1851

After the victory at Naseby the Parliamentarians captured (along with their artillery train and stores) the King's personal baggage including his writing cabinet with correspondence from the last two years, mostly to and from the Queen. The correspondence was published within a month as the pamphlet The King's Cabinet Opened. The correspondence showed Charles intended to seek support from Catholic nations in Europe including Denmark, France, Charles IV of Lorraine, the Prince of Orange and the Papacy. The Portuguese envoy to England had been compromised as the correspondence revealed that he had used diplomatic immunity to channel letters between the King and the Queen.

It also showed correspondence about the Irish Catholic Confederation putting beyond doubt that the King intended to get aid from them. The Confederations's Supreme Council put great hope in a secret treaty they had concluded on the King's behalf with the wealthy English Catholic royalist the Earl of Glamorgan. This Cessation Treaty promised further concessions to Irish Catholics in the future. Glamorgan had gone to Ireland in late June 1645 with secret orders from Charles to agree to the Confederates' demands in return for an Irish Catholic army that would fight for the King in England. It also revealed correspondence with France that Charles would be willing to tolerate English Catholics in return for aid.

The plan would be anathema to most English Protestants at the time. On previous rumours of Irish invasion in October 1644, the Long Parliament passed the Ordinance of no quarter to the Irish to deter the use of Confederate Irish soldiers in England. When Glamorgan's secret orders were publicised in The King's Cabinet Opened, Charles had to deny his link and even proclaim Glamorgan as a traitor to preserve his support in Protestant England.

Charles also showed distaste towards the "mongrel Parliament" which he had summoned to Oxford.

Parliament gained much support in favour of fighting the war to a finish. Within a year, the first civil war ended in a Parliamentarian military victory. It also harmed Charles as it sowed distrust among both his friends and the pro peace faction in Parliament, as well as the powers of Europe who saw from the correspondence that the King's cause was lost.

== Sources ==
- Raymond, Joad (2006). Pamphlets and Pamphleteering in Early Modern Britain. Cambridge University Press. ISBN 978-0-521-02877-6.
- Linnell, Anna-Marie (26 March 2015). Royal memos: From Charles I to Charles III. Stuarts Online.
- Royle, Trevor (2006) [2004]. Civil War: The Wars of the Three Kingdoms 1638–1660. Abacus. ISBN 978-0-3491-1564-1.
- Wedgwood, C. V. (1973). The King's War 1641–1647. London and Glasgow: Collins Fontana.
