= Cromwell at the Battle of Naseby =

Painting by Charles Landseer

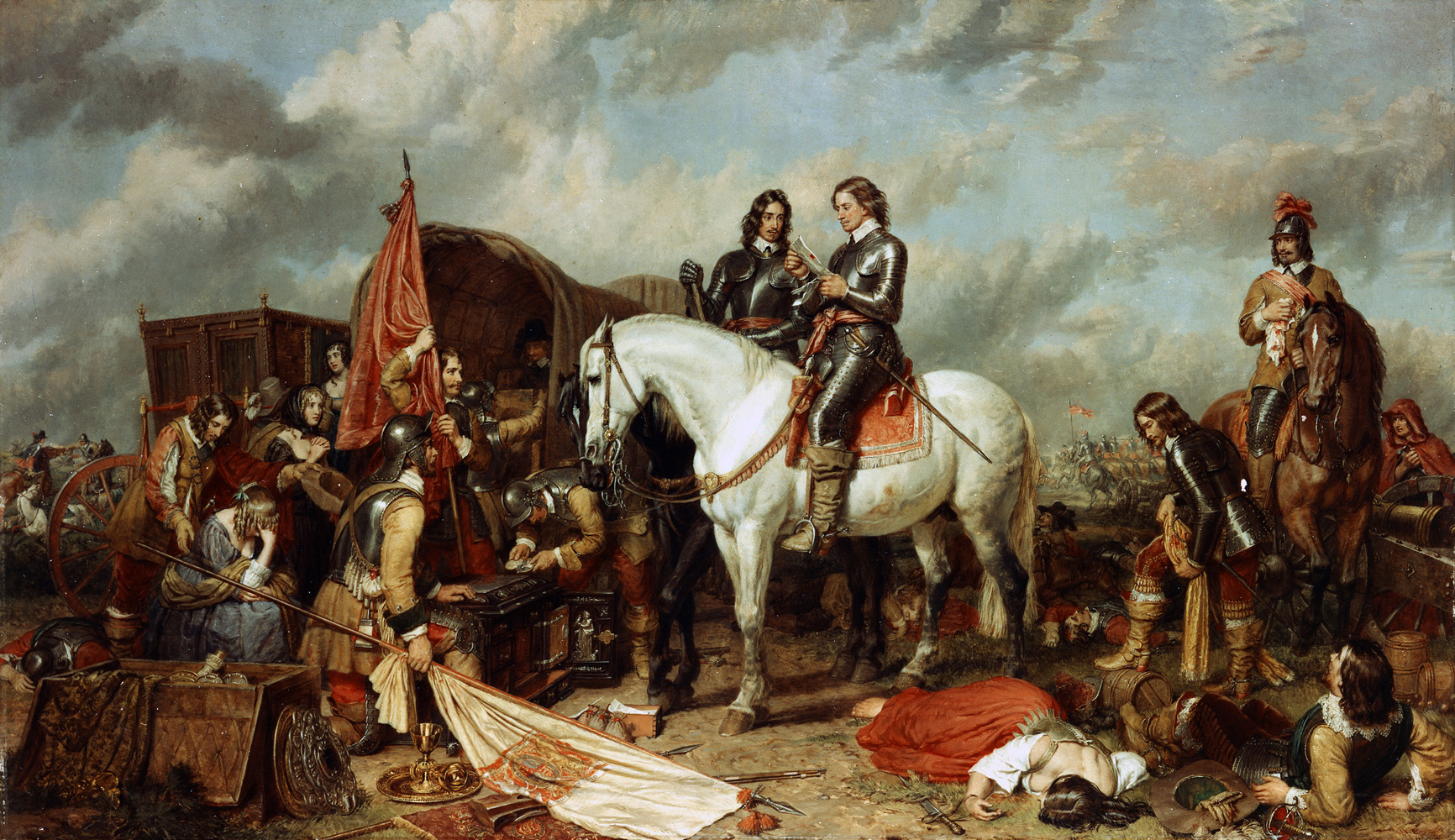
- Artist: Charles Landseer
- Year: 1851
- Medium: Oil on canvas
- Dimensions: 102 cm × 176 cm (40 in × 69 in)
- Location: Alte Nationalgalerie, Berlin

Cromwell at the Battle of Naseby is a 1851 history painting by the Charles Landseer. It depicts Oliver Cromwell at the Battle of Naseby fought on 14 June 1645 during the First English Civil War. A decisive victory for the Parliamentarian forces over their Cavalier opponents, it was a major setback for Charles I. Cromwell is shown in the aftermath of the battle reading captured letters belonging to the king. These were then published as The King's Cabinet Opened.

Landseer was prominent member of the Royal Academy known for his historical scenes. His younger brother Edwin Landseer was a celebrated animal painter. The picture was displayed at the Royal Academy Exhibition of 1851 held at the National Gallery in London. Today it is in the collection of the Alte Nationalgalerie in Berlin.

== See also ==
- The Eve of the Battle of Edgehill, an 1845 painting by Landseer featuring Charles I and his senior commanders

== Bibliography ==
- Bann, Stephen. Scenes and Traces of the English Civil War. Reaktion Books, 2020.
- Neher, Allister. Art and Anatomy in Nineteenth Century Britain. Cambridge Scholars Publishing, 2022.
