= Execution of Charles I of England =

1649 beheading of British monarch

Coordinates: 51.50453°N 0.12619°W

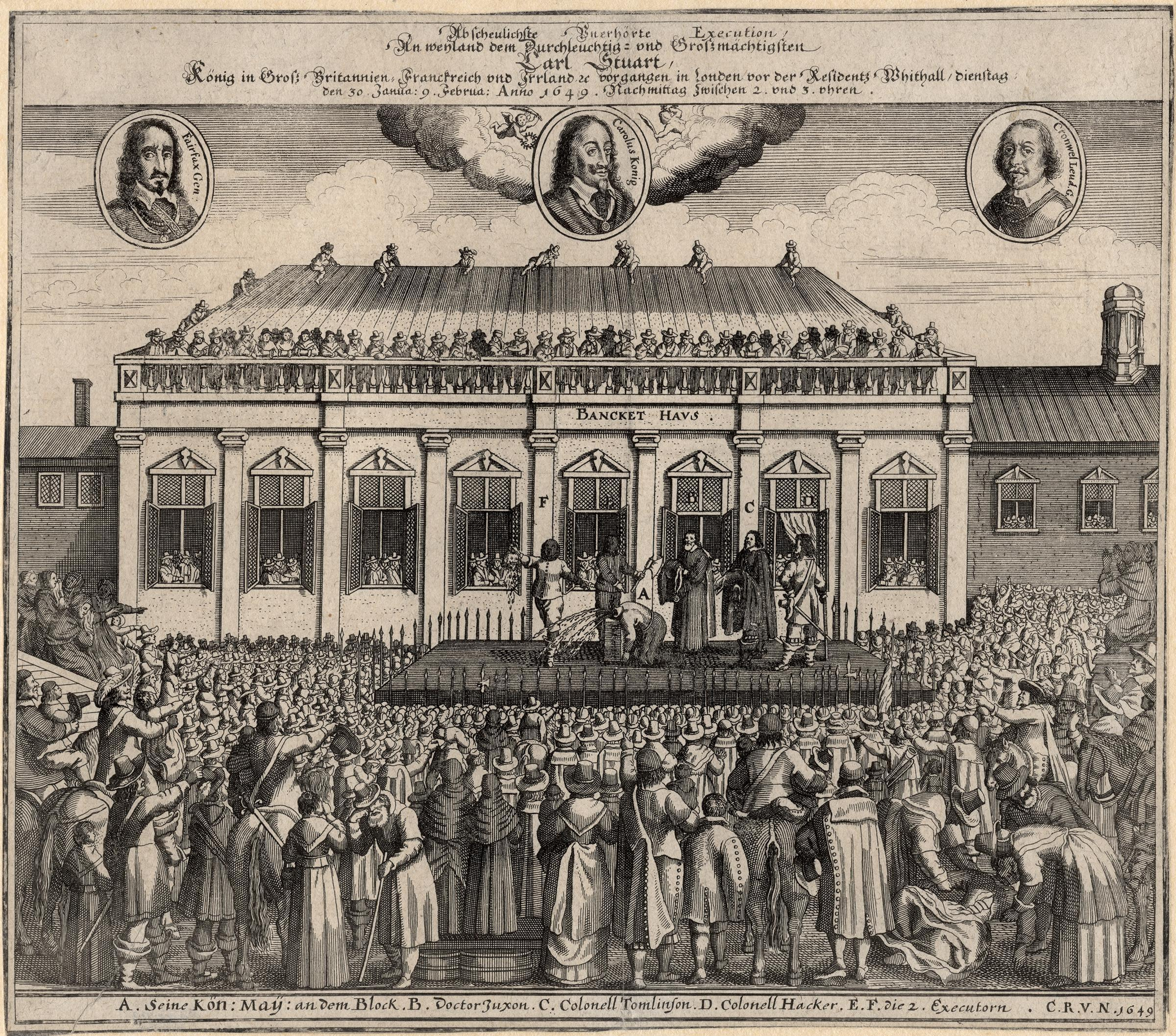
A contemporary German print of the execution of Charles I outside the Banqueting House. Based on the earliest European depiction of the execution. (Note: This print contains some inaccuracies. The executioner is depicted wearing a dark hood rather than a wig and mask and the depiction of the Banqueting House is inaccurate (compare with Inigo Jones' plan for the building).)

Charles I, King of England, Scotland and Ireland, was publicly executed on 30 January 1649 (Note: All dates in this article are in the Old Style (Julian calendar) used in Great Britain throughout Charles's lifetime; however, years are assumed to start on 1 January rather than 25 March (Lady Day), which was the English New Year. By New Style format, Charles was executed on 9 February.) outside the Banqueting House on Whitehall, London. The execution was the culmination of political and military conflicts between the royalists and the parliamentarians in England during the English Civil War, leading to Charles's capture and his trial. On 27 January 1649 the parliamentarian High Court of Justice had declared Charles guilty of attempting to "uphold in himself an unlimited and tyrannical power to rule according to his will, and to overthrow the rights and liberties of the people" and sentenced him to death by beheading.

Charles spent his last few days in St James's Palace, accompanied by his most loyal subjects and visited by his family. On 30 January he was taken to a large black scaffold constructed in front of the Banqueting House, where a large crowd had gathered. Charles stepped onto the scaffold and gave his last speech, declaring his innocence of the crimes of which parliament had accused him, and claiming himself a "martyr of the people". The crowd could not hear the speech, owing to the many parliamentarian guards blocking the scaffold, but Charles's companion, Bishop William Juxon, recorded it in shorthand. Charles gave a few last words to Juxon, claiming an "incorruptible crown" for himself in Heaven, and put his head on the block. He waited a few moments, and after giving a signal that he was ready, the anonymous executioner beheaded Charles with a single blow and held Charles's head up to the crowd silently, dropping it into the swarm of soldiers soon after.

The execution has been described as one of the most significant and controversial events in English history. (Note: Kelsey 2002, p. 727: "The death of Charles I is an iconic moment in the history of western civilization. It is also central to any attempt to define the nature of the English revolution of 1649" Worden 2009: "The beheading of Charles I on January 30th, 1649, left an indelible mark on the history of England and on the way that the English think about themselves" Klein 1997, p. 1 quoting Noel Henning Mayfield: "The trial and execution of Charles Stuart in 1649 stands out in western history. King Charles I was the first European monarch to be put on trial for his life in public by his own subjects. And of course the decline of the British monarchy has played a crucial role in Anglo-American constitutional history") Some viewed it as the martyrdom of an innocent man; the contemporaneous historian Edward Hyde described "a year of reproach and infamy above all years which had passed before it; a year of the highest dissimulation and hypocrisy, of the deepest villainy and most bloody treasons that any nation was ever cursed with"; and the later Tory writer Isaac D'Israeli wrote of Charles as "having received the axe with the same collectedness of thought and died with the majesty with which he had lived", dying a "civil and political" martyr to Britain. Still others viewed it as a vital step towards democracy in Britain, with the prosecutor of Charles I, John Cook, declaring that it "pronounced sentence not only against one tyrant but against tyranny itself" and Samuel Rawson Gardiner, a Whig historian, writing that "with Charles's death the main obstacle to the establishment of a constitutional system had been removed. [...] The monarchy, as Charles understood it, had disappeared forever".

== Execution ==
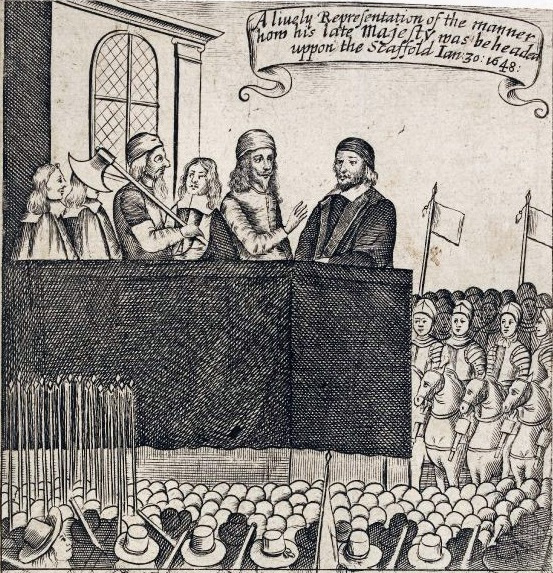
A Lively Representation of the Manner how his late Majesty was Beheaded upon the Scaffold, a Restoration print of Charles making his speech upon the scaffold.

The execution was set to be carried out on 30 January 1649. On 28 January the King was moved from the Palace of Whitehall to St James's Palace, likely to avoid the noise of the scaffold being set up outside the Banqueting House (at its rear side on the street of Whitehall). Charles spent the day praying with the Bishop of London, William Juxon.

On 29 January Charles burnt his personal papers and ciphered correspondence. He had not seen his children for 15 months, so the parliamentarians allowed him to talk to his children, Elizabeth and Henry, for one last time. He instructed the 13-year-old Elizabeth to be faithful to "true Protestant religion" and to tell her mother that "his thoughts had never strayed from her". He instructed the 10-year-old Henry to "not be made a king" by the Parliamentarians, being that many suspected they would install Henry as a puppet king. Charles divided his jewels among the children, leaving him with only his George (an enamelled figure of Saint George, worn as a part of the ceremonial dress of the Order of the Garter). Charles spent his last night restless, going to sleep only at 2 am.

Charles awoke early on the day of his execution. He began dressing at 5 am in fine clothes, all black, and his blue Garter sash. His preparation lasted until dawn. He instructed the Gentleman of the Bedchamber, Thomas Herbert, on what would be done with the few possessions he had left. He requested one extra shirt from Herbert, so that the crowd gathered would not see him shiver from the cold and mistake it for cowardice. Before leaving, Juxon gave Charles the Blessed Sacrament. At 10 am Colonel Francis Hacker instructed Charles to go to Whitehall, ready for his execution. At noon Charles drank a glass of claret wine and ate a piece of bread, reportedly having been persuaded to this effect by Juxon.

A large crowd had amassed outside the Banqueting House, where the platform for Charles's execution was set up. The platform was draped in black and staples had been driven into the wood for ropes to be run through if Charles needed to be restrained. The execution block was so low that the King would have had to prostrate himself to place his head on the block, a submissive pose as compared to kneeling before the block. The executioners were hidden behind face masks and wigs to prevent identification.

As for the People, truly I desire their liberty and freedom, as much as any whosoever; but I must tell you, that their liberty and freedom consists in having of government by those laws, by which their lives, and their goods may be most their own. It is not for them to have a share in Government, that is nothing Sirs, appertaining unto them. A Subject and a Sovereign are clean different things; and therefore until that be done, I mean, until the people be put into that liberty, which I speak of; certainly they will never enjoy themselves.

— Excerpt from Charles I's speech upon the scaffold, as recorded by Juxon.

Just before 2 pm, Colonel Hacker called Charles to the scaffold. Charles came through the window of the Banqueting Hall (Note: It is not known which window Charles came through. Some reports even indicate it was not a window but merely a hole in the wall.) to the scaffold in what Herbert described as "the saddest sight England ever saw". Charles saw the crowd and realised that the barrier of guards prevented the crowd from hearing any speech he would make, so he addressed his speech to Juxon and the regicide Matthew Thomlinson, the former of whom recorded the speech in shorthand. He declared that he was innocent of the crimes of which he was accused, that he was faithful to Christianity, and that it was Parliament that had been the cause of the wars leading up to his execution. He called himself "a martyr of the people"—one who would die for their rights.

Charles asked Juxon for his silk nightcap to put on, so that the executioner would not be troubled by his hair. He turned to Juxon and declared he "would go from a corruptible crown to an incorruptible crown"—claiming his perceived righteous place in Heaven. Charles gave Juxon his George, sash and cloak—uttering one cryptic word: "remember". Charles laid his neck out on the block and asked the executioner to wait for his signal to behead him. A moment passed and Charles gave the signal; the executioner beheaded him in one clean blow.

The executioner silently held up Charles's head to the spectators. He did not utter the customary cry of "Behold the head of a traitor!" either from inexperience or fear of identification. According to the royalist Philip Henry, the crowd let out a loud groan—a 17-year-old Henry writing of "such a groan [...] as I never heard before and I desire I may never hear again"—though such a groan is not reported by any other contemporary account of the execution. The executioner dropped the King's head into the crowd and the soldiers swarmed around it, dipping their handkerchiefs in his blood and cutting off locks of his hair. The body was then put in a coffin and covered with black velvet. It was temporarily placed in the King's former 'lodging chamber' within Whitehall.

=== Executioner ===
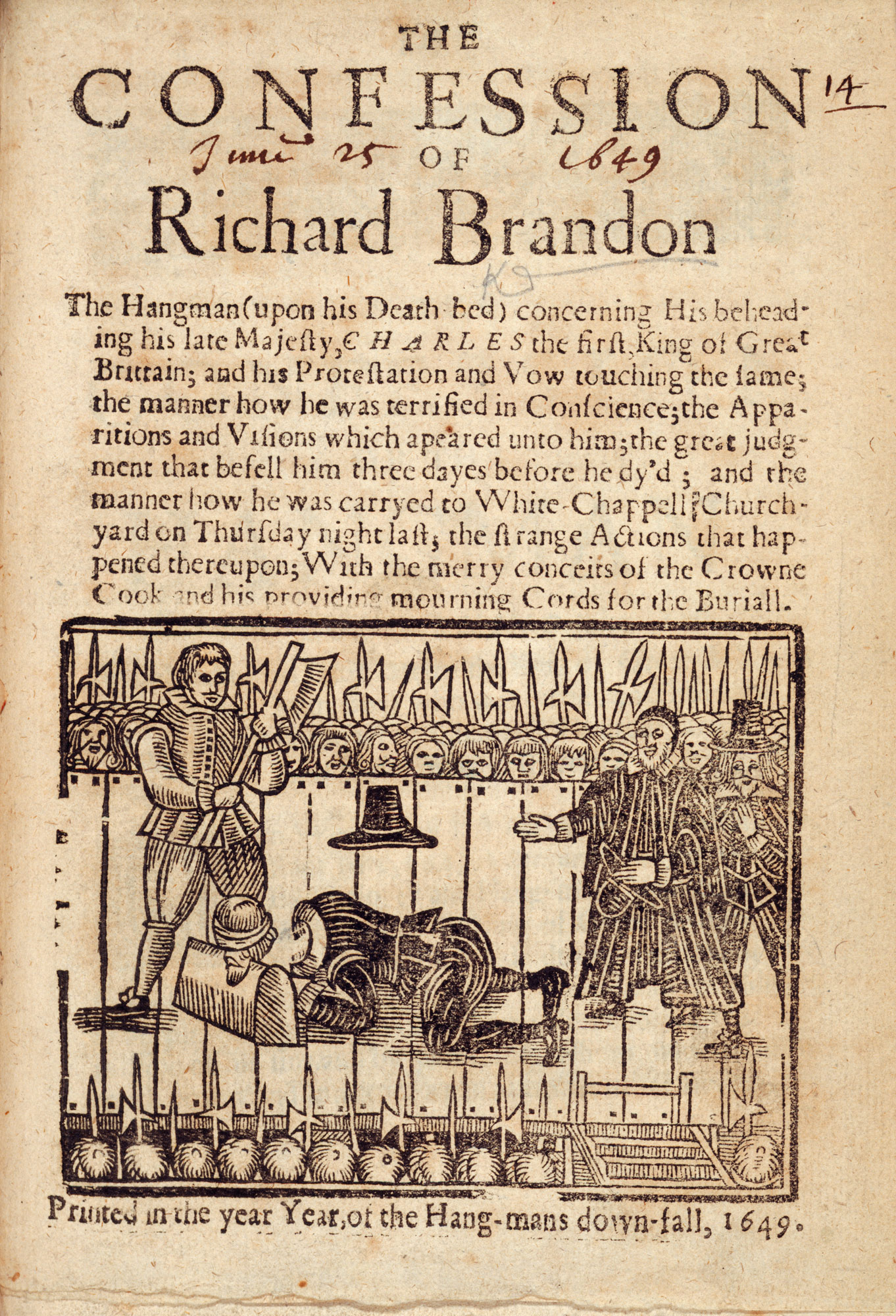
The title page of The Confession of Richard Brandon, a 1649 pamphlet claiming to reveal Richard Brandon as Charles I's executioner.

The identities of the executioner of Charles I and his assistant were never revealed to the public, with crude face masks and wigs hiding them at the execution, and they were probably known only to Oliver Cromwell and a few of his colleagues. The clean cut on Charles's head and the fact the executioner held up Charles's head after the execution suggests the executioner was experienced in the use of an axe, although the fact he did not call out "Behold the head of a traitor!" could suggest either that he was inexperienced in the public execution of traitors, or that he simply feared identification from his voice.

There was much speculation among the public on the identity of the executioner, with several contradictory identifications appearing in the popular press. These included Richard Brandon, William Hulet, William Walker, Hugh Peter, George Joyce, John Bigg, Gregory Brandon and even—as one French report alleged—Cromwell and Thomas Fairfax themselves. Though many of these proved to be unfounded rumours (the accusations directed towards the then-dead Gregory Brandon, and towards Cromwell and Fairfax, have not been taken seriously by historians), some may have been accurate.

Colonel John Hewson was given the task of finding an executioner and he offered 40 soldiers the position of executioner or assistant in exchange for £100 and quick promotion, though none came forward immediately. It has been suggested that one of these soldiers later accepted the job, the most probable candidate among the men being Hulet. Shortly after the execution, Hulet received a prominent and swift promotion and he was not seen to be present on the day of Charles's execution. His alibi consisted of the claim he was imprisoned on the day for refusing the position, though this seems to conflict with his promotion soon after. William Hulet was tried as the executioner in October 1660, upon the Restoration, and he was sentenced to death for his supposed part in the execution. This sentence was soon overturned and Hulet was pardoned after some exculpatory evidence was presented to the judge.

Overall, the most likely candidate for the executioner was Richard Brandon, the common hangman at the time of Charles's execution. He would have been experienced, explaining the clean cut, and he is reported to have received £30 around the time of the execution. He was also the executioner of other royalists before, and after, Charles's execution—including William Laud and Lord Capel. Despite this, Brandon denied being the executioner throughout his life, and a contemporary letter claims that he refused a parliamentarian offer of £200 to perform the execution. A tract published shortly after Brandon's death, The Confession of Richard Brandon, claims to contain a deathbed confession of Brandon to the execution of Charles, though it attracted little attention in its time and is now regarded as a forgery.

Of the other suggested candidates: Peter had prominently advocated for Charles's death but was absent from his execution, though he was reported to have been kept at home through illness. Joyce was a loyal fanatic of Cromwell and had, earlier in the war, captured the King from Holdenby House. William Walker was a parliamentarian soldier who, according to local tradition, had confessed to the regicide several times. Bigg was a clerk of the regicide Simon Mayne and later hermit who, according to local tradition, became a hermit shortly after the Restoration out of fear for being tried as the executioner.

== Burial ==
The sequence of events between Charles's execution and burial are not uniformly agreed upon in historical sources. In one account, Charles's corpse was immediately placed in a coffin and moved to a room in the Palace of Whitehall for public display for several days. Several sources report the body was embalmed at Whitehall before being moved to St James's Palace, though the date and location of this process is not certain. Most sources agree the embalming was performed by Thomas Trapham, the surgeon-general of the New Model Army. One contemporary source alleges that Trapham was ordered to sew Charles's head back onto his body, but no original documentation survives to substantiate this order. The body remained at St James's Palace until 7 February while Parliament decided where it should be buried.

On 8 February, Charles was buried at St George's Chapel, Windsor Castle, in the quire vault containing the remains of Henry VIII and Jane Seymour. The location of Charles's burial was lost in time and rediscovered in 1813, when workmen for King George III inadvertently breached one of the walls of the vault. The Prince Regent ordered the identification of Charles's body among the vault's contents; identification was confirmed by an inscription of Charles's name in the lead coffin and the year of his death, as well as the brief physical removal of Charles's head, which proved it had been "severed from the body by 'a heavy blow, inflicted by a very sharp instrument.'"

== Reaction ==
=== In Britain ===
That thence the Royal actor borne
The tragic scaffold might adorn:
While round the armèd bands
Did clap their bloody hands.
He nothing common did or mean
Upon that memorable scene,
But with his keener eye
The axe's edge did try;

— From Andrew Marvell's "An Horatian Ode upon Cromwell's Return from Ireland", written 1650.

On his execution day, the reports of Charles's last actions were fitting for his later portrayal as a martyr—as the biographer Geoffrey Robertson put it, he "played the martyr's part almost to perfection". This was certainly no accident; a flurry of royalist reports overstated the horror of the crowd and the "biblical innocence" of Charles in his execution. Even Charles showed planning for his future martyrdom: apparently delighted that the biblical passage to be read upon the day of his execution was Matthew's account of the Crucifixion. He had hinted to his cousin the Duke of Hamilton in 1642:

... yet I cannot but tell you, I have set up my rest upon the Justice of my Cause, being resolved, that no extremity or misfortune shall make me yield; for I will be either a Glorious King, or a Patient Martyr, and as yet not being the first, nor at this present apprehending the other, I think it now no unfit time, to express this my Resolution unto you ...

In the opinion of Daniel P. Klein: "Charles was a defeated and humiliated king in 1649. Yet by tying his trial to Christ's, the King was able to lay claim to martyrdom, connecting his defeated political cause with religious truth."

Almost immediately after Charles was executed, (Note: Advanced copies were available on the day of the King's death and the first to go into mass publication were produced in February.) the supposed meditations and autobiography of Charles, Eikon Basilike, began to circulate in England. The book gained massive popularity in a short time, going into twenty editions by the first month of its publication, and has been named by Philip A. Knachel "the most widely read, widely discussed work of royalist propaganda to issue from the English Civil War". The book presented Charles's supposed meditations on the events of his kingship and his justifications for his past actions, widely disseminating the view of Charles as the pious "martyr of the people" he had declared himself to be. It aggravated the fervour of the royalists in the wake of Charles's execution and their high praise led to the wide circulation of the book; some sections even put into verse and music for the uneducated and illiterate of the population. John Milton described it as "the chiefe strength and nerves of their [royalist] cause".

On the other side, the parliamentarians led their own propaganda war against these royalists reports. They suppressed royalist works, among them Eikon Basilike and various other elegies to the deceased king, by arresting and suppressing the printers of such books. Simultaneously, they worked with radical booksellers and publishers to push pro-regicide works, outprinting their opponents by two to one in the month of February, following Charles's execution. John Milton was commissioned to write Eikonoklastes as a parliamentarian rejoinder to Eikon Basilike—sharply mocking the piety of Eikon Basilike and the "image-doting rabble" who latched on to its depiction of Charles, attacking its royalist arguments in a chapter-by-chapter fashion. Charles's prosecutor, John Cook, published a pamphlet defending the execution of Charles, giving "an appeal to all rational men concerning his tryal at the High Court of Justice", in which he asserted that the execution had "pronounced sentence not only against one tyrant but against tyranny itself". These publications had such an effect on the public perception that—despite the regicide going against nearly every conception of social order in the period—the regicides of Charles felt safe in their positions soon after. A contemporary source described Cromwell and Henry Ireton as "very cheerfull & well pleased" at the events by 24 February.

=== In Europe ===
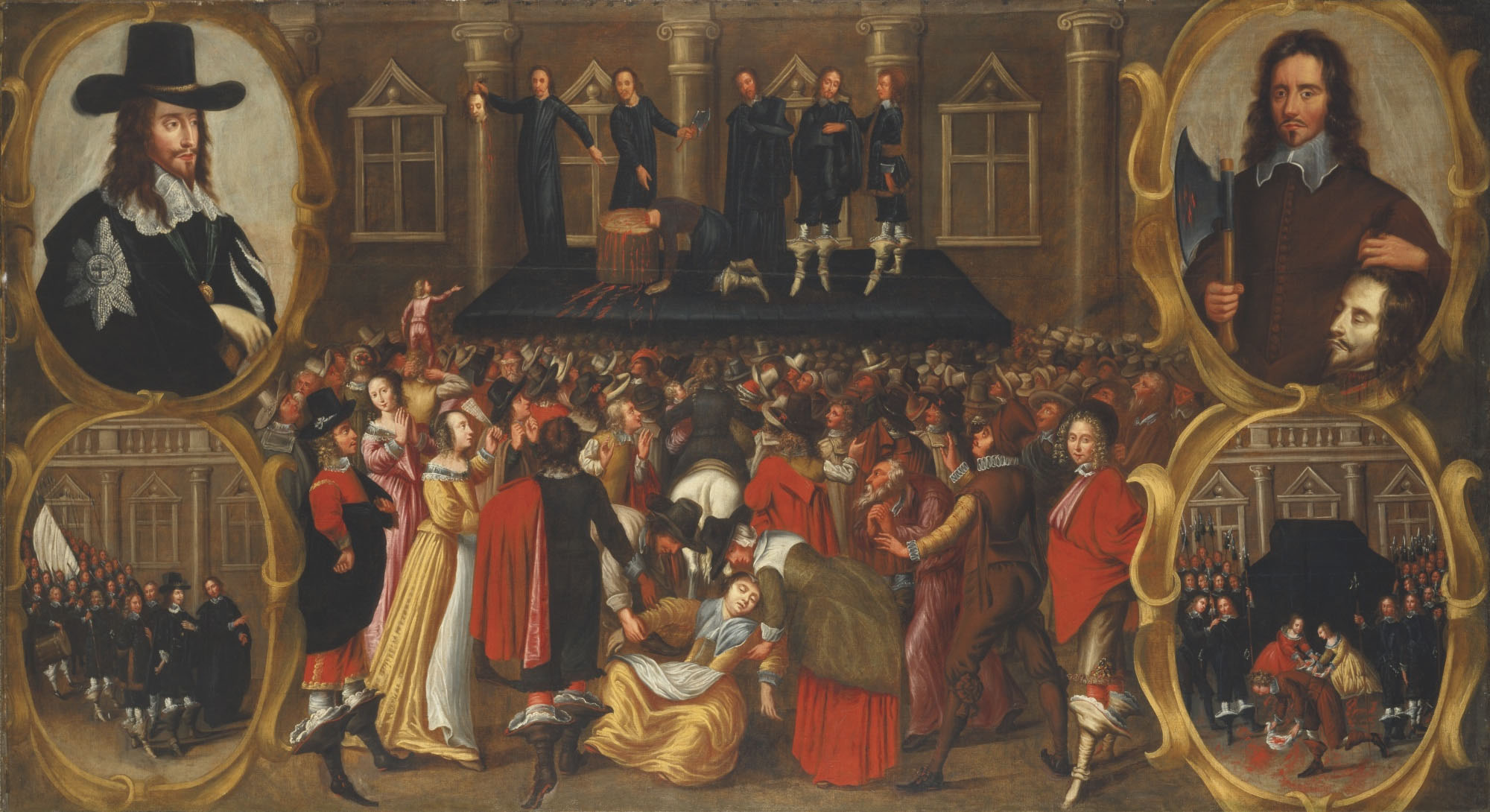
Anonymous Dutch painting of the execution of Charles I, 1649. While depictions of the execution were suppressed in England, European depictions like this were produced, emphasising the shock of the crowd with fainting women and bloodied streets.

Immediately after the Death of the late King [Charles I], Don Alonso de Cardenas, Embassador from Spain, legitimated this bastard Republick; and Oliver had no sooner made himself Sovereign, under the Quality of Protector, than all the Kings of the Earth prostrated themselves before this Idol.

— Abraham de Wicquefort, L'Ambassadeur et ses fonctions (The Hague, 1681)

The reaction among European statesmen was almost universally negative, with the princes and rulers of Europe quick to voice their horror at the regicide. Despite this, very little action was taken against the new English government, as foreign governments carefully avoided cutting off relations with England over their condemnations of the execution. Even the allies of the royalists in the Vatican, France and the Netherlands avoided straining relationships with the parliamentarians in England; the official statement of sympathy to Charles II from the Dutch went as far as possible to avoid calling him "your majesty". Most European nations had their own troubles occupying their minds, such as negotiating the terms of the recently signed Peace of Westphalia, and the regicide was treated with what Richard Bonney described as a "half-hearted irrelevance". As C. V. Wedgwood put it, the general conduct of the statesmen of Europe was to "pay lip-service alone to the idea of avenging the outrage [of the execution], and to govern their conduct towards its perpetrators by purely practical considerations".

One notable exception was the Russian Tsar Alexis, who broke off diplomatic relations with England and accepted royalist refugees in Moscow. He also banned all English merchants from his country (notably members of the Muscovy Company) and provided financial assistance to Charles II, sending his condolences to Henrietta Maria, "the disconsolate widow of that glorious martyr, King Charles I".

=== In the American colonies ===
News of the execution of Charles I travelled slowly to England's North American colonies; on 26 May Roger Williams of Rhode Island reported that "the King and many great Lords and Parliament men are beheaded", and on 3 June Adam Winthrop reported from Boston that "heer is now a London shipp come in, that bringeth the newes that the King is beheaded." However, the initial content of the discussion from letters and diaries remains unclear:

Not until God seemed to signify his approval of the regicide by showering victories on the Commonwealth's armies did public statements of colonial views begin to appear. When Cromwell led the English forces to victory over Charles II and his Scottish supporters at Dunbar in September 1650, the churches of New England celebrated with a day of thanksgiving.

— Francis J. Bremer

== Legacy ==
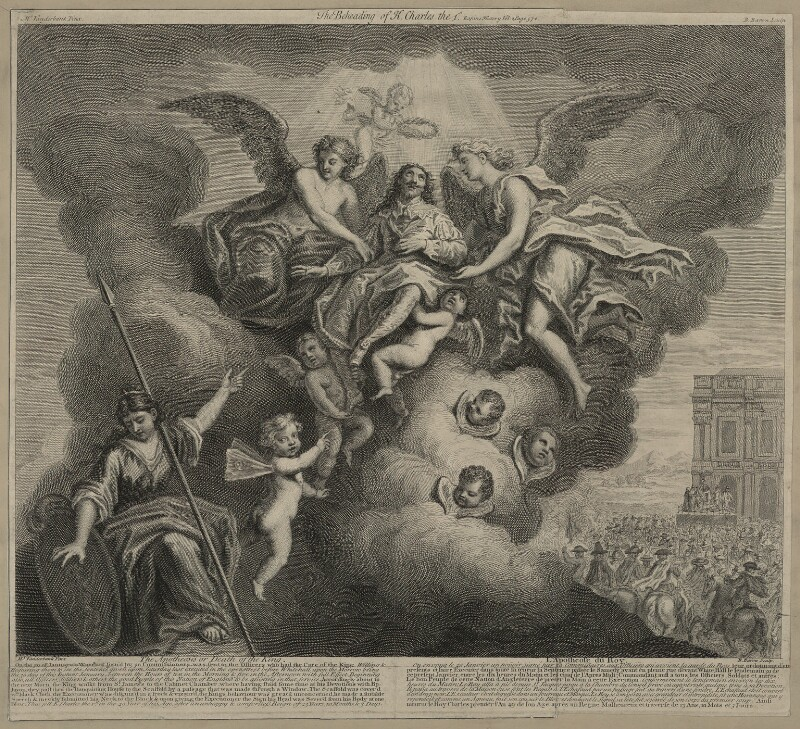
The Apotheosis, or, Death of the King by Bernard Baron, a 1728 engraving from a biographical series about Charles I. Charles is shown ascending to heaven after his execution, borne by angels, while a figure representing Britain looks away in shame.

The image of Charles's execution was central to the cult of King Charles the Martyr, a major theme in English royalism of this period. Shortly after Charles's death, relics of Charles's execution were reported to perform miracles—with handkerchiefs of Charles's blood supposedly curing the King's Evil among peasants. Many elegies and works of devotion were produced to glorify the dead Charles and his cause. After the Restoration of the English monarchy in 1660, this private devotion was transformed into official worship: in 1661 the Church of England declared 30 January a solemn fast for the martyrdom of Charles. Charles occupied a saint-like status in prayer books of this time. In Charles II's reign, (as estimated by Francis Turner) around 3000 sermons were given annually to commemorate the martyrdom of Charles. Much Restoration historiography of the Civil War emphasised the regicide as a grand and theatrical tragedy, depicting the last days of Charles's life in a hagiographical fashion. Few saw the executed king's character as fallible. England's Lord Chancellor after the Restoration, Edward Hyde, in his monumental History of the Rebellion (1702–1704), was one of the few sometimes critical of Charles's actions and to perceive his flaws as a king, but his account the year of Charles's execution ended with a passionate condemnation of:

... a year of reproach and infamy above all years which had passed before it; a year of the highest dissimulation and hypocrisy, of the deepest villainy and most bloody treasons that any nation was ever cursed with or under; a year in which the memory of all transactions ought to be rased out of all records, lest, by the success of it, atheism, infidelity, and rebellion should be propagated in the world: a year of which we may say, as the historian [Tacitus] said in the time of Domitian, et sicut vetus aetas vidit quid ultimum in libertate esset, ita nos quid in servitute [and just as the former age witnessed how far freedom can go, so we have witnessed how far slavery can]

After the Glorious Revolution, even as royalism declined, the cult continued to enjoy support; the anniversaries of Charles's execution created an annual "general madding-day" of Royal support—as Whig Edmund Ludlow put it—up until the 18th century. Early Whig historians such as James Wellwood and Roger Coke, even as they criticised and mocked the Stuarts, were hesitant to criticise Charles and quick to condemn the execution as an abomination. The memory of Charles's execution remained uncomfortable for many Whigs in Britain. To delegitimise this cult, later Whigs spread the view of Charles as a tyrant, and his execution as a step towards constitutional government in Britain. In opposition, British Tory literary and political figures, including Isaac D'Israeli and Walter Scott, attempted to rejuvenate the cult with romanticised tales of Charles's execution—emphasising the same tropes of martyrdom the royalists had done before them. D'Israeli narrated the execution of Charles I in his Commentaries on the Life and Reign of Charles the First (1828), in which Charles dies "having received the axe with the same collectedness of thought and died with the majesty with which he had lived". For D'Israeli, "the martyrdom of Charles was a civil and political one", which "seems an expiation of the errors and infirmities of the early years of his reign." However, by the Victorian era, the view of the Whig historians had prevailed in British historiography and the public consciousness. The observance of 30 January as the "martyrdom" of Charles was officially removed from the services of the Church of England with the Anniversary Days Observance Act 1859, and the number of sermons given upon the death of Charles I dwindled. This Whig view was exemplified by the Victorian historian Samuel Rawson Gardiner as he closed his 1886–1891 History of the Great Civil War:

Whether the necessity really existed or was but the tyrant's plea is a question upon the answer to which men have long differed, and will probably continue to differ. All can perceive that with Charles's death the main obstacle to the establishment of a constitutional system was removed. Personal rulers might indeed reappear, and Parliament had not yet so displayed its superiority as a governing power to make Englishmen anxious to dispense with monarchy in some form or other. The monarchy, as Charles understood it, had disappeared for ever. Insecurity of tenure would make it impossible for future rulers long to set public opinion at naught, as Charles had done. The scaffold at Whitehall accomplished that which neither the eloquence of Eliot and Pym nor the Statutes and Ordinances of the Long Parliament had been capable of effecting.

Charles I's life and his execution has often been a subject of popular representations in the modern day. Popular historians, such as Samuel Rawson Gardiner, C.V. Wedgwood and J.G. Muddiman, have retold the tale of Charles I's decline and fall, through his trial and to his execution, in narrative histories. Films and television have exploited the dramatic tension and shock of the execution for many purposes: from comedy as in Blackadder: The Cavalier Years, to period drama as in To Kill a King. The subject of the execution, though, has suffered from a notable lack of serious scholarship throughout the modern era; perhaps partly out of what Jason Peacey, a leading figure in the scholarship of Charles I's execution, has called a discomfort at "such a thoroughly 'un-English' project as removing the head of their monarch". This stigma has slowly been lifted, as academic interest has risen into the late 20th century, eliciting much interest in 1999, upon the 350th anniversary of the trial and execution of Charles I.

== See also ==
- Execution of Mary, Queen of Scots
- Execution of Louis XVI
- Murder of the Romanov family
- King Charles the Martyr
- Fifth Monarchists
- Charles I Insulted by Cromwell's Soldiers
- Calves' Head Club

== General sources ==
=== Books ===
- Carlton, Charles (1983), Charles I: The Personal Monarch, London: Routledge, ISBN 978-0-7100-9485-8
- Edwards, Graham (1999), The Last Days of Charles I, Sutton: Sutton Publishing Ltd, ISBN 978-0-7509-2679-9
- Gardiner, Samuel R. (1901), History of The Great Civil War, 1642–1649: Volume 4, 1647–1649, London: Longmans, Green and Co., OCLC 2567093
- Hibbert, Christopher (1968), Charles I, New York: Harper & Row, OCLC 398731
- Lacey, Andrew (2003), The Cult of King Charles the Martyr, Studies in Modern British Religious History, vol. 7, Boydell & Brewer, ISBN 978-0-85115-922-5, JSTOR 10.7722/j.ctt820jm
- Robertson, Geoffrey (2005), The Tyrannicide Brief: The Story of the Man who sent Charles I to the Scaffold, London: Chatto & Windus, ISBN 978-1-4000-4451-1
- Sidney, Philip (1905), The Headsman of Whitehall, Edinburgh: Geo. A. Morton
- Wedgwood, C. V. (1981), A Coffin for King Charles: The Trial and Execution of Charles I, New York: Time Incorporated, OCLC 1029280370

=== Articles ===
- Beddard, R. A. (1984), "Wren's Mausoleum for Charles I and the Cult of the Royal Martyr", Architectural History, 27: 36–49, doi:10.2307/1568449, JSTOR 1568449, S2CID 195031293
- Bonney, Richard (2001), "The European Reaction to the Trial and Execution of Charles I", in Peacey, Jason (ed.), The Regicides and the Execution of Charles I, London: Palgrave Macmillan, pp. 247–279, ISBN 978-0-333-80259-5
- D'Israeli, Isaac (1851), "The Trial and the Decapitation", in Disraeli, Benjamin (ed.), Commentaries on the Life and Reign of Charles the First, King of England, vol. 2, London: Henry Colburn, pp. 568–573, hdl:2027/nyp.33433075871446, OCLC 717007182
- Gheeraert-Graffeuille, Claire (2011), "The Tragedy of Regicide in Interregnum and Restoration Histories of the English Civil Wars" (PDF), Études Épistémè, 20 (20), doi:10.4000/episteme.430
- Holmes, Clive (2010), "The Trial and Execution of Charles I", The Historical Journal, 53 (2): 289–316, doi:10.1017/S0018246X10000026, S2CID 159524099
- Kelsey, Sean (2002), "The Death of Charles I", The Historical Journal, 45 (4): 727–754, doi:10.1017/S0018246X02002650, S2CID 159629005
- Klein, Daniel P. (1997), "The Trial of Charles I", The Journal of Legal History, 18 (1): 1–25, doi:10.1080/01440369708531168
- Knachel, Philip A. (1966), Introduction, Eikon Basilike: The Portraiture of his Sacred Majesty in his Solitudes and Sufferings, by Charles I, Folger Documents of Tudor and Stuart Civilization, New York: Cornell University Press, pp. xi–xxxii, OCLC 407343
- Lacey, Andrew (2001), "Elegies and Commemorative Verse in Honour of Charles the Martyr, 1649–60", in Peacey, Jason (ed.), The Regicides and the Execution of Charles I, London: Palgrave Macmillan, pp. 225–246, ISBN 978-0-333-80259-5
- Napton, Dani (2018), "Historical Romance and the Mythology of Charles I in D'Israeli, Scott and Disraeli", English Studies, 99 (2): 148–165, doi:10.1080/0013838X.2017.1420617, S2CID 165213123
- Peacey, Jason (2001), "Introduction", in Peacey, Jason (ed.), The Regicides and the Execution of Charles I, London: Palgrave Macmillan, pp. 1–13, ISBN 978-0-333-80259-5
- Sharpe, Kevin (2000), "'So Hard a Text'? Images of Charles I, 1612-1700", The Historical Journal, 43 (2): 383–405, doi:10.1017/S0018246X99001132, JSTOR 3021034, S2CID 159780150
- Skerpan-Wheeler, Elizabeth (2011), "The First 'Royal': Charles I as Celebrity", PMLA, 126 (4): 912–934, doi:10.1632/pmla.2011.126.4.912, JSTOR 41414167, S2CID 153380267
- Toynbee, M. R. (1950), "Charles I and the King's Evil", Folklore, 61 (1): 1–14, doi:10.1080/0015587X.1950.9717968, JSTOR 1257298
- Tubb, Amos (2004), "Printing the Regicide of Charles I", History, 89 (4): 500–524, doi:10.1111/j.0018-2648.2004.t01-1-00310.x, JSTOR 24427624
- Wedgwood, C. V. (1965), "European Reaction to the Death of Charles I", The American Scholar, 34 (3): 431–446, JSTOR 41209297
- Wilcher, Robert (1991), "What Was the King's Book for?: The Evolution of 'Eikon Basilike'", The Yearbook of English Studies, 21: 218–228, doi:10.2307/3508490, JSTOR 3508490
- Worden, Blair (February 2009), "The Execution of Charles I", History Today, 59 (2)
