= Cultural depictions of Charles I of England =

Charles I of England has been depicted in popular culture a number of times.

== Music ==
- "Curse My Name", a song by German power metal band Blind Guardian on the album At the Edge of Time (2010), depicts the downfall and execution of Charles I.
- "King Charles" is a song on the 2018 debut EP of English musician Yungblud.
- Charles I, (Charles, King and Martyr) has many hymns dedicated to him. Mostly sung by High-Church Anglicans(Anglo-Catholics), such as "With Thankful Hearts thy Glory" commemorating his life as a "saintly story", calling him a "Martyr-King" and calling his death "The ultimate oblation, a Martyr's sacrifice!" Another well-known hymn is called "O, Holy king whose severed head" asking Charles to pray "For England's Church for England's realm once thine in earthly sway."

== Literature ==
- Jowitt views the character of the gentleman Vitelli in Massinger's 1624 play The Renegado as an allegory of the prince during the failed marriage attempt.
- There is the manuscript of a play entitled Charles I by Percy Shelley, started in early 1822 and left unfinished after his death.
- Twenty Years After, by Alexandre Dumas, gives a highly fictionalised account of Charles I's downfall, trial and death condensed into a few days. The book's fictional villain, Mordaunt, is depicted as the king's executioner, while Athos, Aramis, D'Artagnan and Porthos are his secret – and unsuccessful – helpers.
- John Inglesant (1881), by Joseph Henry Shorthouse, features the hero meeting Charles I.
- In High Places (1898) by Mary Elizabeth Braddon depicts the youth of Charles I.
- 1649: A Novel of a Year by Jack Lindsay (1938) begins with Charles' execution.
- The Civil War period is seen through the eyes of the fictional Morland family in The Oak Apple, Volume 4 of The Morland Dynasty, a series of historical novels by author Cynthia Harrod-Eagles.
- Mary of Carisbrooke: The Girl Who Would Not Betray Her King by Margaret Campbell Barnes (1956) narrates the relationship of the titular heroine with Charles, during the latter's imprisonment on the Isle of Wight.
- 55 Days (2012 – played in the premiere production by Mark Gatiss)
- He makes a brief appearance in Lawrence Norfolk's John Saturnall's Feast, published in 2012 by Bloomsbury Publishing.
- He's a character in The King's Spy by Andrew Swanston, set mainly in Oxford; the novel was published in August 2012 by Bantam Press.
- In Traitor's Field by Robert Wilton, published in May 2013 by Bloomsbury Publishing, the reader follows him from his imprisonment in Carisbrooke Castle on the Isle of Wight to his trial and, ultimately, execution in Whitehall.
- Makes an appearance in Elizabeth Goudge's 1958 novel, The White Witch, set during the Civil War.
- Ellanor's Exchange by Linda Hayner contains a fictionalized account of how John Pym and his friends avoid arrest by Charles I.

== Film and television ==
On screen, Charles has been portrayed by:

- Russell Thorndike in the British silent film Henrietta Maria; or, The Queen of Sorrow (1923)
- Henry Victor in the British silent film The Royal Oak (1923), in which he also played Charles II
- Hugh Miller in The Vicar of Bray (1937)
- Robert Rietty in The Scarlet Blade (1963)
- Stephen MacDonald in the BBC TV drama series Witch Wood (1964)
- Kenneth Colley in a drama in the BBC TV series Thirty-Minute Theatre entitled Revolutions: Cromwell (1970)
- Alec Guinness in Cromwell (1970)
- Jeremy Clyde in the BBC TV drama series The Children of the New Forest (1977) and By the Sword Divided (1983)
- Stephen Fry in the BBC TV comedy short Blackadder: The Cavalier Years (1988), with very similar mannerisms to King Charles III
- Bill Paterson in The Return of the Musketeers (1989), loosely based on the novel Twenty Years After
- Aleksei Petrenko in the Russian film Mushketyory 20 let spustya (1992), also based on Twenty Years After
- Chris Kirk in the British TV drama documentary Civil War: England's Fight for Freedom (1997)
- Rupert Everett in To Kill a King (2003)
- Martin Turner briefly at the beginning of the BBC TV miniseries Charles II: The Power & the Passion (2003)
- Peter Capaldi in Channel 4's four-part TV drama series The Devil's Whore (2008)
- Mathew Baynton, Adam Riches, Ryan Sampson, Richard David-Caine and Ethan Lawrence in the British children's sketch show Horrible Histories (2009–2015)
- Samuel Blenkin in the British historical drama television miniseries Mary & George
