= List of people from Elmhurst, Illinois =

The following list includes notable people who were born or have lived in Elmhurst, Illinois. For a similar list organized alphabetically by last name, see the category page People from Elmhurst, Illinois.

== Academics ==
- Charles Tilly, sociologist

== Arts and culture ==
- Keenan Cahill, internet celebrity for lip-syncing
- Ken Hudson Campbell, American actor (Home Alone)
- Catherine E. Coulson, actress (Twin Peaks' "Log Lady")
- John Grochowski, author and radio personality
- George Peter Alexander Healy, painter
- Tom Higgenson, singer for pop punk band The Plain White T's
- Louisa Boyd Yeomans King, gardener and author; resided 1890–c. 1902
- Rachel Melvin, actress
- Senta Moses, actress (Home Alone, Home Alone 2: Lost in New York)
- Rick Nielsen, musician (Cheap Trick)
- The Orwells, punk rock band
- Phillip Ramey, composer and pianist
- Gary Rydstrom, sound engineer, director
- Carl Sandburg, poet, historian, and novelist
- Michelle Slatalla, journalist and humorist
- Ian Michael Smith, actor (Simon Birch)
- Modern Vices, rock band
- Mars Williams, musician (The Psychedelic Furs)
- Michael Salvatori, composer

== Authors and scientists ==
- Fred Ramsdell, biomedical scientist and Nobel laureate
- Patrick Piemonte, computer scientist, inventor, and human interface designer; born in Elmhurst

== Military ==
- William J. Cullerton (1923–2013), World War II flying ace who flew with the 357th Fighter Squadron, conservationist and member of the Cullerton political family
- Theodore L. Kramer (1847–1910), recipient of the Medal of Honor in the American Civil War; buried in Elmhurst

== Politics and civics ==
- William J. Bauer, Chief Judge of the United States Court of Appeals for the Seventh Circuit from 1986 to 1993. He was first appointed to the bench by Richard Nixon in 1971. He was raised in Elmhurst and attended Elmhurst College.
- Bob Biggins, politician
- Thomas Barbour Bryan, businessman and politician
- Charles Page Bryan, diplomat
- Dan Cronin, Chairman of the DuPage County Board since 2010 and member of the Illinois Senate from 1993 to 2010.
- Lee A. Daniels, 66th Speaker of the Illinois House of Representatives who represented all or parts of Elmhurst from 1975 until 2007.
- Eugene V. Debs, founding member of the Industrial Workers of the World and five time presidential candidate for the Socialist Party of America. He died at Lindlahr Sanitarium, a Nature Cure treatment facility located in Elmhurst.
- Edwin Feulner, founding trustee of The Heritage Foundation, a conservative Washington, D.C. think tank. He is credited with building it into one of the most influential conservative think tanks. He moved to Elmhurst at age nine and attended Immaculate Conception High School.
- Natalie Jaresko, Ukraine's Minister of Finance (2014–2016). She was born in Elmhurst and raised in nearby Wood Dale.
- Daniel Keefe, president and founder of the International Longshoremen's Association and Commissioner-General of Immigration under William Howard Taft. He died in Elmhurst on January 2, 1929.
- Jack T. Knuepfer, member of the Illinois Senate from 1967 until 1975 and Chairman of the DuPage County Board from 1978 until 1990.
- Arthur C. Lueder, Illinois businessman and politician who served as Illinois Auditor of Public Accounts and as a Republican member of the Illinois House of Representatives.
- Lewis V. Morgan, Illinois state representative, judge, and lawyer
- Chris Nybo, member of the Illinois Senate and past member of the Elmhurst City Council.
- Jim Ryan, Illinois Attorney General from 1995–2003.
- Jerry Stermer, 8th Illinois Comptroller who served briefly after the death of Judy Baar Topinka. He was raised in Elmhurst.
- Tom Van Norman, Democratic member of the South Dakota House of Representatives from 2000–2008.

== Sports ==
- Kerry Abello, soccer player
- Greg Bloedorn, long snapper for the Seattle Seahawks
- David Cohn (born 1995), American-Israeli basketball player in the Israel Basketball Premier League
- Darrin Fletcher, catcher for the Los Angeles Dodgers, Philadelphia Phillies, Montreal Expos and Toronto Blue Jays
- Jody Gerut, outfielder for the Milwaukee Brewers
- Jeff Hornacek, NBA player
- Skip James, player for the San Francisco Giants
- Danny Jansen, catcher for the Toronto Blue Jays
- Garth Lagerwey, general manager for the Seattle Sounders FC
- Fred Lorenzen, former NASCAR driver
- Mike Magee, soccer forward for the New York Red Bulls, Los Angeles Galaxy, and Chicago Fire; 2013 MLS Most Valuable Player
- Keith McCready, pool player
- Joe Newton, former York High School cross country and track coach, won 29 state titles
- Jack O'Callahan, former Chicago Black Hawks hockey player
- Betty Okino, Olympic gymnast
- Steve Rushin, Sports Illustrated writer
- Donald Sage, cross country runner
- Dan Schatzeder, pitcher, played for nine different teams
- Mark Sibley, NBA player
- Garret Sparks, goaltender for the Toronto Maple Leafs (NHL), the Chicago Wolves (AHL)
- Larry Stefanki, tennis player
- Al Weis, infielder with the Chicago White Sox (1962–1967) and NY Mets (1968–1971)
- Mark Wilson, pro golfer
- John Witt, author, sportswriter, actor and ballhawk

== Other ==
- John R. MacDougall, hijacker, suspect of the Captain Midnight broadcast signal intrusion in 1986
