= Listed buildings in Royal Tunbridge Wells =

Civil Parish in Kent, England

Royal Tunbridge Wells is an unparished town in the Borough of Tunbridge Wells of Kent, England. It contains one grade I, 35 grade II* and 254 grade II listed buildings that are recorded in the National Heritage List for England.

This list is based on the information retrieved online from Historic England.

== Key ==
Grade	Criteria
I	Buildings that are of exceptional interest
II*	Particularly important buildings of more than special interest
II	Buildings that are of special interest

== Listing ==
Name	Grade	Location	Type	Completed (Note: The date given is the date used by Historic England as significant for the initial building or that of an important part in the structure's description.)	Date designated	Grid ref. (Note: Sometimes known as OSGB36, the grid reference is based on the British national grid reference system used by the Ordnance Survey.) Geo-coordinates	Notes	Entry number (Note: The "List Entry Number" is a unique number assigned to each listed building and scheduled monument by Historic England.)	Image	Wikidata
2-10, Bedford Terrace	II	2-10, Bedford Terrace			20 May 1952	TQ5825638821; 51°07′37″N 0°15′37″E		1346474	2-10, Bedford Terrace More images	Q26630016
Belgrove House	II	2, Belgrove			20 May 1952	TQ5845438888; 51°07′38″N 0°15′47″E		1083777	Upload Photo	Q26366627
4-8, Belgrove	II	4-8, Belgrove			7 June 1974	TQ5845738896; 51°07′39″N 0°15′47″E		1346475	Upload Photo	Q26630017
Christmas Cottage	II	1, Berkeley Place			24 November 1966	TQ5846538860; 51°07′38″N 0°15′47″E		1346476	Upload Photo	Q26630018
11 and 13, Berkeley Road	II	11 and 13, Berkeley Road			7 June 1974	TQ5842538864; 51°07′38″N 0°15′45″E		1083779	Upload Photo	Q26366639
15 and 17, Berkeley Road	II	15 and 17, Berkeley Road			7 June 1974	TQ5842838871; 51°07′38″N 0°15′46″E		1203316	Upload Photo	Q26498863
The Manor House	II	6, Bishops Down Road			20 May 1952	TQ5749039332; 51°07′54″N 0°14′58″E		1203321	Upload Photo	Q26498867
1, Calverley Park	II*	1, Calverley Park			20 May 1952	TQ5879139409; 51°07′55″N 0°16′05″E		1203357	Upload Photo	Q17547429
2, Calverley Park	II*	2, Calverley Park			20 May 1952	TQ5885639456; 51°07′56″N 0°16′09″E		1083782	Upload Photo	Q17547240
3, Calverley Park	II*	3, Calverley Park			20 May 1952	TQ5891139435; 51°07′56″N 0°16′11″E		1083783	Upload Photo	Q17547245
4, Calverley Park	II*	4, Calverley Park			20 May 1952	TQ5895939414; 51°07′55″N 0°16′14″E		1203389	Upload Photo	Q17547432
5 and 6, Calverley Park	II*	5 and 6, Calverley Park			20 May 1952	TQ5882439405; 51°07′55″N 0°16′07″E		1083784	Upload Photo	Q17547250
7, Calverley Park	II*	7, Calverley Park			20 May 1952	TQ5886039402; 51°07′55″N 0°16′09″E		1083785	Upload Photo	Q17547254
8, Calverley Park	II*	8, Calverley Park			20 May 1952	TQ5890539384; 51°07′54″N 0°16′11″E		1203390	Upload Photo	Q17547437
9 and 10, Calverley Park	II*	9 and 10, Calverley Park			20 May 1952	TQ5892839360; 51°07′53″N 0°16′12″E		1083786	Upload Photo	Q17547262
11, Calverley Park	II*	11, Calverley Park			20 May 1952	TQ5896639340; 51°07′53″N 0°16′14″E		1083787	Upload Photo	Q17547265
12, Calverley Park	II*	12, Calverley Park			20 May 1952	TQ5898339319; 51°07′52″N 0°16′15″E		1346497	Upload Photo	Q17547795
13, Calverley Park	II*	13, Calverley Park			20 May 1952	TQ5899639287; 51°07′51″N 0°16′15″E		1083744	Upload Photo	Q17547182
14, Calverley Park	II*	14, Calverley Park			20 May 1952	TQ5899839261; 51°07′50″N 0°16′16″E		1083745	Upload Photo	Q17547187
15, Calverley Park	II*	15, Calverley Park			20 May 1952	TQ5899439234; 51°07′49″N 0°16′15″E		1346498	Upload Photo	Q17547800
16, Calverley Park	II*	16, Calverley Park			20 May 1952	TQ5898439210; 51°07′48″N 0°16′15″E		1083746	Upload Photo	Q17547192
17, Calverley Park	II*	17, Calverley Park			20 May 1952	TQ5897439187; 51°07′48″N 0°16′14″E		1346499	Upload Photo	Q17547806
18, Calverley Park	II*	18, Calverley Park			20 May 1952	TQ5896339168; 51°07′47″N 0°16′14″E		1083747	Upload Photo	Q17547198
19, Calverley Park	II*	19, Calverley Park			20 May 1952	TQ5895339145; 51°07′46″N 0°16′13″E		1083748	Upload Photo	Q17547205
20, Calverley Park	II*	20, Calverley Park			20 May 1952	TQ5894639129; 51°07′46″N 0°16′13″E		1346500	Upload Photo	Q17547811
21, Calverley Park	II*	21, Calverley Park			20 May 1952	TQ5893339108; 51°07′45″N 0°16′12″E		1083749	Upload Photo	Q17547211
22, Calverley Park	II*	22, Calverley Park			20 May 1952	TQ5892939089; 51°07′45″N 0°16′12″E		1346501	Upload Photo	Q17547816
23, Calverley Park	II*	23, Calverley Park			20 May 1952	TQ5891639071; 51°07′44″N 0°16′11″E		1083750	Upload Photo	Q17547217
24, Calverley Park	II*	24, Calverley Park			20 May 1952	TQ5890839055; 51°07′43″N 0°16′11″E		1083751	Upload Photo	Q17547223
1-17, Calverley Park Crescent	II*	1-17, Calverley Park Crescent			24 November 1966	TQ5875539459; 51°07′57″N 0°16′03″E		1346502	Upload Photo	Q17547824
3, Calverley Park Gardens	II	3, Calverley Park Gardens			26 March 1973	TQ5895939585; 51°08′01″N 0°16′14″E		1223580	Upload Photo	Q26517838
4, Calverley Park Gardens	II	4, Calverley Park Gardens			26 March 1973	TQ5898239483; 51°07′57″N 0°16′15″E		1083752	Upload Photo	Q26366512
6, Calverley Park Gardens	II	6, Calverley Park Gardens			11 September 1973	TQ5903339481; 51°07′57″N 0°16′18″E		1346503	Upload Photo	Q26630038
59, Calverley Road, 57, Calverley Road, 61, Calverley Road, 63-79, Calverley Road	II	59, Calverley Road, 57, Calverley Road, 61, Calverley Road, 63-79, Calverley Road			6 July 1972	TQ5875439567; 51°08′00″N 0°16′03″E		1223583	Upload Photo	Q26517841
Cambridge House	II	1-9, Cambridge Gardens			7 June 1974	TQ5896638995; 51°07′41″N 0°16′13″E		1083754	Upload Photo	Q26366522
The Lawn Including Garden Boundary Wall and Gate Piers To North	II	5, Camden Park			20 June 1988	TQ5930239088; 51°07′44″N 0°16′31″E		1338821	Upload Photo	Q26623113
2 and 4, Castle Street	II	2 and 4, Castle Street			7 June 1974	TQ5832038957; 51°07′41″N 0°15′40″E		1346465	2 and 4, Castle Street More images	Q26630007
11, Chapel Place	II	11, Chapel Place			20 May 1952	TQ5823338831; 51°07′37″N 0°15′35″E		1223608	11, Chapel Place More images	Q26517863
13 and 15, Chapel Place	II	13 and 15, Chapel Place			7 June 1974	TQ5822838823; 51°07′37″N 0°15′35″E		1083756	13 and 15, Chapel Place More images	Q26366533
14 and 14A, Chapel Place, 16, Chapel Place	II	14 and 14A, Chapel Place, 16, Chapel Place			7 June 1974	TQ5822338838; 51°07′37″N 0°15′35″E		1083757	14 and 14A, Chapel Place, 16, Chapel Place More images	Q26366538
17, Chapel Place	II	17, Chapel Place			7 June 1974	TQ5822138813; 51°07′36″N 0°15′35″E		1223609	17, Chapel Place More images	Q26517864
19, Chapel Place	II	19, Chapel Place			7 June 1974	TQ5822038806; 51°07′36″N 0°15′35″E		1346466	Upload Photo	Q26630008
11-29, Church Road	II	11-29, Church Road			7 June 1974	TQ5831939427; 51°07′56″N 0°15′41″E		1083763	11-29, Church Road More images	Q26366570
16 and 18, Church Road	II	16 and 18, Church Road			7 June 1974	TQ5827939480; 51°07′58″N 0°15′39″E		1083760	16 and 18, Church Road More images	Q26366554
20 and 22, Church Road	II	20 and 22, Church Road			7 June 1974	TQ5826439478; 51°07′58″N 0°15′38″E		1223643	20 and 22, Church Road More images	Q26517896
26, Church Road	II	26, Church Road			7 June 1974	TQ5824239460; 51°07′57″N 0°15′37″E		1223644	26, Church Road More images	Q26517897
28 and 30, Church Road	II	28 and 30, Church Road			7 June 1974	TQ5823339460; 51°07′57″N 0°15′36″E		1083762	28 and 30, Church Road More images	Q26366564
41-45, Church Road	II	41-45, Church Road			7 June 1974	TQ5819939433; 51°07′56″N 0°15′35″E		1223651	41-45, Church Road More images	Q26517904
Chase Cottage The Old House	II	47, Claremont Road			7 June 1974	TQ5877938836; 51°07′36″N 0°16′04″E		1083764	Upload Photo	Q26366576
Clarence House	II	1, Clarence Road			7 June 1974	TQ5826339438; 51°07′56″N 0°15′38″E		1223657	Clarence House More images	Q26517910
South Lawn	II	2, Clarence Road			7 June 1974	TQ5826239402; 51°07′55″N 0°15′38″E		1083765	Upload Photo	Q26366582
34-38, Mount Sion, 1A, Clifton Place	II	34-38, Mount Sion, 1A, Clifton Place			7 June 1974	TQ5851838813; 51°07′36″N 0°15′50″E		1338827	Upload Photo	Q26623119
9 and 10, Crescent Road	II	9 and 10, Crescent Road			7 June 1974	TQ5859139464; 51°07′57″N 0°15′55″E		1084490	Upload Photo	Q26368185
1-4, Cumberland Gardens	II	1-4, Cumberland Gardens			7 June 1974	TQ5829838776; 51°07′35″N 0°15′39″E		1084492	Upload Photo	Q26368187
Pavement In Front Of Nos 4 To 20	II	4-20, Cumberland Walk			7 June 1974	TQ5829738714; 51°07′33″N 0°15′39″E		1084495	Upload Photo	Q26368192
Harecroft School	II	8, Cumberland Walk			24 November 1966	TQ5829038742; 51°07′34″N 0°15′38″E		1338781	Upload Photo	Q26623074
6, Cumberland Walk	II	6, Cumberland Walk			20 May 1952	TQ5826638759; 51°07′35″N 0°15′37″E		1084493	Upload Photo	Q26368189
7, Cumberland Walk	II	7, Cumberland Walk			20 May 1952	TQ5827838752; 51°07′34″N 0°15′38″E		1266959	Upload Photo	Q26557406
9, Cumberland Walk	II	9, Cumberland Walk			24 November 1966	TQ5829938737; 51°07′34″N 0°15′39″E		1266961	Upload Photo	Q26557408
247, Forest Road	II	247, Forest Road			7 June 1974	TQ5823337538; 51°06′55″N 0°15′33″E		1224189	Upload Photo	Q26518390
Frog Cottage	II	5, Frog Lane			7 June 1974	TQ5836838852; 51°07′37″N 0°15′42″E		1266941	Upload Photo	Q26557389
4, Frog Lane	II	4, Frog Lane			24 November 1966	TQ5835538858; 51°07′38″N 0°15′42″E		1338783	Upload Photo	Q26623076
14 and 16, Garden Street	II	14 and 16, Garden Street			17 December 1973	TQ5877939598; 51°08′01″N 0°16′05″E		1266948	Upload Photo	Q26557396
18 and 20, Garden Street	II	18 and 20, Garden Street			17 December 1973	TQ5878839590; 51°08′01″N 0°16′05″E		1084498	Upload Photo	Q26368196
6 and 8, Garden Street	II	6 and 8, Garden Street			17 December 1973	TQ5875839616; 51°08′02″N 0°16′04″E		1084497	Upload Photo	Q26368195
18, Goods Station Road	II	18, Goods Station Road			15 April 1987	TQ5856139797; 51°08′08″N 0°15′54″E		1084419	Upload Photo	Q26368086
Grovsvenor Lodge	II	72, Grosvenor Road			7 June 1974	TQ5839539925; 51°08′12″N 0°15′46″E		1084499	Upload Photo	Q26368198
58, Grosvenor Road	II	58, Grosvenor Road			7 June 1974	TQ5839839880; 51°08′11″N 0°15′46″E		1266810	Upload Photo	Q26557270
88, Grosvenor Road	II	88, Grosvenor Road			23 November 1987	TQ5835339971; 51°08′14″N 0°15′43″E		1084420	Upload Photo	Q26368087
1 and 2, Grove Hill Gardens	II	1 and 2, Grove Hill Gardens			7 June 1974	TQ5883939032; 51°07′43″N 0°16′07″E		1084500	Upload Photo	Q26368199
11 and 12, Grove Hill Gardens	II	11 and 12, Grove Hill Gardens			7 June 1974	TQ5875738971; 51°07′41″N 0°16′03″E		1266797	Upload Photo	Q26557257
3 and 4, Grove Hill Gardens	II	3 and 4, Grove Hill Gardens			7 June 1974	TQ5883239014; 51°07′42″N 0°16′07″E		1084501	Upload Photo	Q26368201
5 and 6, Grove Hill Gardens	II	5 and 6, Grove Hill Gardens			7 June 1974	TQ5882238999; 51°07′42″N 0°16′06″E		1266790	Upload Photo	Q26557250
7 and 8, Grove Hill Gardens	II	7 and 8, Grove Hill Gardens			7 June 1974	TQ5880938987; 51°07′41″N 0°16′05″E		1084502	Upload Photo	Q26368202
9 and 10, Grove Hill Gardens	II	9 and 10, Grove Hill Gardens			7 June 1974	TQ5878738977; 51°07′41″N 0°16′04″E		1224461	Upload Photo	Q26518641
58, Grove Hill Road	II	58, Grove Hill Road			7 June 1974	TQ5870939060; 51°07′44″N 0°16′00″E		1084467	Upload Photo	Q26368153
86 and 88, Grove Hill Road	II	86 and 88, Grove Hill Road			24 November 1966	TQ5889239019; 51°07′42″N 0°16′10″E		1338805	Upload Photo	Q26623097
Hanover Strict Baptist Chapel	II	1, Hanover Road			7 June 1974	TQ5837039804; 51°08′08″N 0°15′44″E		1084468	Upload Photo	Q26368155
Hanover Lodge	II	4, Hanover Road			7 June 1974	TQ5836039783; 51°08′08″N 0°15′44″E		1084469	Upload Photo	Q26368156
5, Hanover Road	II	5, Hanover Road			7 June 1974	TQ5835439778; 51°08′07″N 0°15′43″E		1338806	Upload Photo	Q26623098
York House	II	71 and 73, High Street			7 June 1974	TQ5830638885; 51°07′39″N 0°15′39″E		1266460	Upload Photo	Q26556950
10, High Street	II	10, High Street			7 June 1974	TQ5841539086; 51°07′45″N 0°15′45″E		1084470	Upload Photo	Q26368158
12 and 14, High Street	II	12 and 14, High Street			7 June 1974	TQ5841139081; 51°07′45″N 0°15′45″E		1338807	Upload Photo	Q26623099
15-25, High Street	II	15-25, High Street			7 June 1974	TQ5840739014; 51°07′43″N 0°15′45″E		1266459	15-25, High Street More images	Q26556949
22 and 24, High Street	II	22 and 24, High Street			7 June 1974	TQ5840039054; 51°07′44″N 0°15′44″E		1084471	Upload Photo	Q26368159
27 and 29, High Street	II	27 and 29, High Street			7 June 1974	TQ5839138992; 51°07′42″N 0°15′44″E		1338810	27 and 29, High Street More images	Q26623102
64, High Street	II	64, High Street			7 June 1974	TQ5831838940; 51°07′40″N 0°15′40″E		1084472	64, High Street More images	Q26368161
66, High Street	II	66, High Street			7 June 1974	TQ5831238936; 51°07′40″N 0°15′40″E		1338808	66, High Street More images	Q26623100
68, High Street	II	68, High Street			7 June 1974	TQ5830838933; 51°07′40″N 0°15′40″E		1084473	68, High Street More images	Q26368162
70 and 72, High Street	II	70 and 72, High Street			7 June 1974	TQ5830238929; 51°07′40″N 0°15′39″E		1225152	70 and 72, High Street More images	Q26519272
74, High Street	II	74, High Street			7 June 1974	TQ5829738924; 51°07′40″N 0°15′39″E		1338809	74, High Street More images	Q26623101
76 and 78, High Street	II	76 and 78, High Street			7 June 1974	TQ5829238919; 51°07′40″N 0°15′39″E		1084474	76 and 78, High Street More images	Q26368164
90-94, High Street	II	90-94, High Street			16 February 1976	TQ5825538889; 51°07′39″N 0°15′37″E		1226176	90-94, High Street More images	Q26520203
2 and 2A, Hungershall Park	II	2 and 2A, Hungershall Park			7 June 1974	TQ5736438695; 51°07′33″N 0°14′51″E		1338811	Upload Photo	Q26623103
17, Landsdowne Road	II	17, Landsdowne Road			24 November 1966	TQ5886939714; 51°08′05″N 0°16′10″E		1338812	Upload Photo	Q26623104
1 and 3, Langton Road	II	1 and 3, Langton Road			7 June 1974	TQ5730739147; 51°07′48″N 0°14′48″E		1084475	Upload Photo	Q26368165
5-11, Langton Road	II	5-11, Langton Road			24 November 1966	TQ5729739157; 51°07′48″N 0°14′48″E		1266466	Upload Photo	Q26556956
Farthings	II	30, Little Mount Sion			7 June 1974	TQ5841538882; 51°07′38″N 0°15′45″E		1084476	Upload Photo	Q26368167
Grove Tavern	II	34, Little Mount Sion			7 June 1974	TQ5842738882; 51°07′38″N 0°15′46″E		1084477	Upload Photo	Q26368168
3, Berkeley Place, 2, Berkeley Place, 36, Little Mount Sion	II	3, Berkeley Place, 2, Berkeley Place, 36, Little Mount Sion			20 May 1952	TQ5844738865; 51°07′38″N 0°15′47″E		1083778	Upload Photo	Q26366633
32, Little Mount Sion	II	32, Little Mount Sion			7 June 1974	TQ5842038882; 51°07′38″N 0°15′45″E		1225219	Upload Photo	Q26519333
5 and 7, Little Mount Sion	II	5 and 7, Little Mount Sion			29 June 1987	TQ5834138899; 51°07′39″N 0°15′41″E		1225885	Upload Photo	Q26519942
8, London Road	II	8, London Road			7 June 1974	TQ5824638891; 51°07′39″N 0°15′36″E		1084479	8, London Road More images	Q26368170
8A and 9, London Road	II	8A and 9, London Road			7 June 1974	TQ5825038897; 51°07′39″N 0°15′36″E		1225277	8A and 9, London Road More images	Q26519386
Richmond Terrace	II	47-50, London Road			7 June 1974	TQ5821839198; 51°07′49″N 0°15′35″E		1084481	Richmond Terrace More images	Q26368173
26, London Road	II	26, London Road			7 June 1974	TQ5829238964; 51°07′41″N 0°15′39″E		1084480	26, London Road More images	Q26368171
Vale Towers	II	58, London Road			7 June 1974	TQ5817539286; 51°07′52″N 0°15′33″E		1084482	Vale Towers More images	Q26368174
Ashton Lodge	II	69, London Road			20 May 1952	TQ5820639469; 51°07′58″N 0°15′35″E		1338813	Ashton Lodge More images	Q26623105
Rock View	II	78, London Road			7 June 1974	TQ5823939628; 51°08′03″N 0°15′37″E		1084486	Upload Photo	Q26368179
Rock Villa	II*	85, London Road			20 May 1952	TQ5827539705; 51°08′05″N 0°15′39″E		1338834	Upload Photo	Q17547775
47, Church Road, 68, London Road	II*	47, Church Road, 68, London Road			20 May 1952	TQ5818639437; 51°07′57″N 0°15′34″E		1225330	47, Church Road, 68, London Road More images	Q17547458
60 and 61, London Road	II	60 and 61, London Road			7 June 1974	TQ5817539355; 51°07′54″N 0°15′33″E		1266435	60 and 61, London Road More images	Q26556926
62 and 63, London Road	II	62 and 63, London Road			7 June 1974	TQ5817539373; 51°07′54″N 0°15′33″E		1084483	62 and 63, London Road More images	Q26368176
65, London Road	II	65, London Road			7 June 1974	TQ5818039417; 51°07′56″N 0°15′34″E		1084484	65, London Road More images	Q26368177
70 and 71, London Road	II	70 and 71, London Road			20 May 1952	TQ5820639488; 51°07′58″N 0°15′35″E		1225332	70 and 71, London Road More images	Q26519434
72, London Road	II*	72, London Road			20 May 1952	TQ5820839503; 51°07′59″N 0°15′35″E		1084485	72, London Road More images	Q17547291
73, London Road	II	73, London Road			15 June 1972	TQ5821139520; 51°07′59″N 0°15′35″E		1338814	73, London Road More images	Q26623106
77, London Road	II	77, London Road			20 May 1952	TQ5823639590; 51°08′01″N 0°15′37″E		1225334	Upload Photo	Q26519436
83, London Road	II	83, London Road			7 June 1974	TQ5825939685; 51°08′04″N 0°15′38″E		1338815	Upload Photo	Q26623107
84, London Road	II	84, London Road			7 June 1974	TQ5827139695; 51°08′05″N 0°15′39″E		1266379	Upload Photo	Q26556872
17-21, Mount Ephraim	II	17-21, Mount Ephraim			24 November 1966	TQ5828639840; 51°08′09″N 0°15′40″E		1084451	Upload Photo	Q26368131
24, Mount Ephraim Road, 45, Mount Ephraim	II	24, Mount Ephraim Road, 45, Mount Ephraim			20 May 1952	TQ5825139747; 51°08′06″N 0°15′38″E		1266184	Upload Photo	Q26556698
24-30, Mount Ephraim	II	24-30, Mount Ephraim			7 June 1974	TQ5825639834; 51°08′09″N 0°15′38″E		1084453	Upload Photo	Q26368134
The George Hotel	II	29, Mount Ephraim			24 November 1966	TQ5828639802; 51°08′08″N 0°15′40″E		1338839	Upload Photo	Q26623130
The Wishing Well	II	32, Mount Ephraim			24 November 1966	TQ5825139822; 51°08′09″N 0°15′38″E		1225603	Upload Photo	Q26519686
37, Mount Ephraim	II	37, Mount Ephraim			7 June 1974	TQ5826239777; 51°08′07″N 0°15′38″E		1084452	Upload Photo	Q26368133
38, Mount Ephraim	II	38, Mount Ephraim			7 June 1974	TQ5824339801; 51°08′08″N 0°15′38″E		1338840	Upload Photo	Q26623131
40, Mount Ephraim	II	40, Mount Ephraim			7 June 1974	TQ5824139795; 51°08′08″N 0°15′37″E		1084454	Upload Photo	Q26368136
41 and 43, Mount Ephraim	II	41 and 43, Mount Ephraim			7 June 1974	TQ5825139760; 51°08′07″N 0°15′38″E		1225595	Upload Photo	Q26519678
42, Mount Ephraim	II	42, Mount Ephraim			7 June 1974	TQ5823739791; 51°08′08″N 0°15′37″E		1266268	Upload Photo	Q26556772
Montpelier Cottage	II	48 and 48A, Mount Ephraim			7 June 1974	TQ5822439768; 51°08′07″N 0°15′37″E		1338801	Upload Photo	Q26623093
52 and 53, Mount Ephraim	II	52 and 53, Mount Ephraim			24 November 1966	TQ5818639724; 51°08′06″N 0°15′34″E		1225610	Upload Photo	Q26519691
Temple House	II	54 and 55, Mount Ephraim			24 November 1966	TQ5817039714; 51°08′05″N 0°15′34″E		1084455	Upload Photo	Q26368137
58, Mount Ephraim	II	58, Mount Ephraim			7 June 1974	TQ5815639675; 51°08′04″N 0°15′33″E		1084456	Upload Photo	Q26368139
The Royal Mount Ephraim Hotel	II	59, Mount Ephraim			20 May 1952	TQ5812439688; 51°08′05″N 0°15′31″E		1225637	Upload Photo	Q26519715
60, Mount Ephraim	II	60, Mount Ephraim			20 May 1952	TQ5813039659; 51°08′04″N 0°15′32″E		1084457	Upload Photo	Q26368140
61, Mount Ephraim	II	61, Mount Ephraim			7 June 1974	TQ5812039653; 51°08′04″N 0°15′31″E		1084458	Upload Photo	Q26368142
63-65, Mount Ephraim	II	63-65, Mount Ephraim			20 May 1952	TQ5807339611; 51°08′02″N 0°15′29″E		1225648	Upload Photo	Q26519725
79, Mount Ephraim	II	79, Mount Ephraim			20 May 1952	TQ5782239366; 51°07′55″N 0°15′15″E		1225741	Upload Photo	Q26519808
Wellington Lodge	II	82, Mount Ephraim			7 June 1974	TQ5780039338; 51°07′54″N 0°15′14″E		1084460	Upload Photo	Q26368145
The Wellington Hotel	II	84, Mount Ephraim			7 June 1974	TQ5774939302; 51°07′53″N 0°15′11″E		1084461	Upload Photo	Q26368146
The Chalet	II	86, Mount Ephraim			24 November 1966	TQ5771339261; 51°07′51″N 0°15′09″E		1225742	Upload Photo	Q26519809
Hanover House	II	18, Mount Ephraim Road			26 March 1973	TQ5830639737; 51°08′06″N 0°15′41″E		1084463	Upload Photo	Q26368149
20, Mount Ephraim Road	II	20, Mount Ephraim Road			7 June 1974	TQ5827339735; 51°08′06″N 0°15′39″E		1225744	Upload Photo	Q26519811
22, Mount Ephraim Road	II	22, Mount Ephraim Road			24 November 1966	TQ5826239739; 51°08′06″N 0°15′38″E		1338802	Upload Photo	Q26623094
82, Mount Pleasant Road	II	82, Mount Pleasant Road			7 June 1974	TQ5848139422; 51°07′56″N 0°15′49″E		1225765	82, Mount Pleasant Road More images	Q26519831
Walmer Cottage	II	13, Mount Sion			24 November 1966	TQ5831938859; 51°07′38″N 0°15′40″E		1084423	Upload Photo	Q26368092
Sion House	II	15, Mount Sion			24 November 1966	TQ5832738845; 51°07′37″N 0°15′40″E		1338823	Upload Photo	Q26623115
Howard Lodge	II	16, Mount Sion			20 May 1952	TQ5831038795; 51°07′36″N 0°15′39″E		1338825	Upload Photo	Q26623117
17, Mount Sion	II	17, Mount Sion			24 November 1966	TQ5834138847; 51°07′37″N 0°15′41″E		1084424	Upload Photo	Q26368093
Jerningham House	II	18 and 20, Mount Sion			20 May 1952	TQ5833438806; 51°07′36″N 0°15′41″E		1084427	Upload Photo	Q26368098
Caxton House	II	19 and 21, Mount Sion			24 November 1966	TQ5835138831; 51°07′37″N 0°15′42″E		1084425	Upload Photo	Q26368095
22, Mount Sion	II	22, Mount Sion			7 June 1974	TQ5835838786; 51°07′35″N 0°15′42″E		1338826	Upload Photo	Q26623118
Ivy Chimneys	II	28, Mount Sion			20 May 1952	TQ5844638750; 51°07′34″N 0°15′46″E		1084428	Upload Photo	Q26368099
Cecil Court	II	30, Mount Sion			20 May 1952	TQ5848138761; 51°07′34″N 0°15′48″E		1084429	Upload Photo	Q26368100
1 and 2, Nevill Park	II	1 and 2, Nevill Park			7 June 1974	TQ5729139056; 51°07′45″N 0°14′47″E		1084430	Upload Photo	Q26368102
2, Nevill Street	II	2, Nevill Street			11 October 1973	TQ5817138770; 51°07′35″N 0°15′32″E		1338828	2, Nevill Street More images	Q26623120
4, Nevill Street	II	4, Nevill Street			7 June 1974	TQ5816238749; 51°07′34″N 0°15′32″E		1066589	4, Nevill Street More images	Q26319516
6, Nevill Street	II	6, Nevill Street			7 June 1974	TQ5816038738; 51°07′34″N 0°15′32″E		1084431	6, Nevill Street More images	Q26368103
8-14, Nevill Street	II	8-14, Nevill Street			7 June 1974	TQ5815638727; 51°07′34″N 0°15′31″E		1084432	8-14, Nevill Street More images	Q26368104
10 and 12, Newcomen Road	II	10 and 12, Newcomen Road			20 January 2016	TQ5829540430; 51°08′29″N 0°15′41″E		1431333	Upload Photo	Q26677706
14 and 16, Newcomen Road	II	14 and 16, Newcomen Road			20 January 2016	TQ5831540436; 51°08′29″N 0°15′42″E		1431337	Upload Photo	Q26677707
18 and 20, Newcomen Road	II	18 and 20, Newcomen Road			20 January 2016	TQ5834140445; 51°08′29″N 0°15′44″E		1431339	Upload Photo	Q26677708
26 and 28, Newcomen Road	II	26 and 28, Newcomen Road			20 January 2016	TQ5838840467; 51°08′30″N 0°15′46″E		1431344	Upload Photo	Q26677709
6 and 8, Newcomen Road	II	6 and 8, Newcomen Road			20 January 2016	TQ5828340425; 51°08′28″N 0°15′41″E		1431309	Upload Photo	Q26677705
Grecian Temple, Dunorlan Park	II	Dunorlan Park, Pembury Road			5 March 2009	TQ6007739754; 51°08′05″N 0°17′12″E		1393165	Upload Photo	Q26672349
Pulhamite and Terracotta Fountain, Dunorlan Park	II	Dunorlan Park, Pembury Road			5 March 2009	TQ6020139571; 51°07′59″N 0°17′18″E		1393166	Upload Photo	Q26672350
Pulhamite Rockery, Dunorlan Park	II	Dunorlan Park, Pembury Road			5 March 2009	TQ6011739634; 51°08′01″N 0°17′14″E		1393167	Upload Photo	Q26672351
32 and 34, St John's Road	II	32 and 34, St John's Road			7 June 1974	TQ5833140111; 51°08′18″N 0°15′43″E		1338859	Upload Photo	Q26623148
Duke Of York Public House	II	17 and 19, The Pantiles			20 May 1952	TQ5812438760; 51°07′35″N 0°15′30″E		1066559	Duke Of York Public House More images	Q26319485
The Corn Exchange	II	49, The Pantiles			20 May 1952	TQ5811638700; 51°07′33″N 0°15′29″E		1084438	The Corn Exchange More images	Q26368112
Glen Albion Sussex House Sussex Place	II	57, The Pantiles			20 May 1952	TQ5807238668; 51°07′32″N 0°15′27″E		1084439	Glen Albion Sussex House Sussex Place More images	Q26368113
The Swan Hotel	II	58, The Pantiles			20 May 1952	TQ5805338715; 51°07′33″N 0°15′26″E		1065935	The Swan Hotel More images	Q26318959
The Bath House	II	6, The Pantiles			14 July 1988	TQ5814938799; 51°07′36″N 0°15′31″E		1225910	The Bath House More images	Q26519967
1, The Pantiles	II	1, The Pantiles			20 May 1952	TQ5817138792; 51°07′36″N 0°15′32″E		1066594	1, The Pantiles More images	Q26319520
11-15, The Pantiles	II	11-15, The Pantiles			20 May 1952	TQ5813538771; 51°07′35″N 0°15′30″E		1338830	11-15, The Pantiles More images	Q26623122
12-16, The Pantiles	II	12-16, The Pantiles			20 May 1952	TQ5812338798; 51°07′36″N 0°15′30″E		1357392	12-16, The Pantiles More images	Q26639928
18, The Pantiles, 20-24, The Pantiles, 18A and 18B, The Pantiles	II	18, The Pantiles, 20-24, The Pantiles, 18A and 18B, The Pantiles			20 May 1952	TQ5811438790; 51°07′36″N 0°15′29″E		1084441	18, The Pantiles, 20-24, The Pantiles, 18A and 18B, The Pantiles More images	Q26368117
2, The Pantiles	II	2, The Pantiles			20 May 1952	TQ5816238810; 51°07′36″N 0°15′32″E		1338831	2, The Pantiles More images	Q26623123
21-29, The Pantiles	II	21-29, The Pantiles			20 May 1952	TQ5813138741; 51°07′34″N 0°15′30″E		1084434	21-29, The Pantiles More images	Q26368107
26 and 28, The Pantiles	II	26 and 28, The Pantiles			20 May 1952	TQ5810238775; 51°07′35″N 0°15′29″E		1338832	26 and 28, The Pantiles More images	Q26623124
2A, The Pantiles, 4, The Pantiles	II	2A, The Pantiles, 4, The Pantiles			20 May 1952	TQ5815438806; 51°07′36″N 0°15′31″E		1066027	Upload Photo	Q26319041
3, The Pantiles	II	3, The Pantiles			20 May 1952	TQ5816838791; 51°07′36″N 0°15′32″E		1338829	Upload Photo	Q26623121
31 and 31A, The Pantiles	II	31 and 31A, The Pantiles			20 May 1952	TQ5811838722; 51°07′33″N 0°15′29″E		1084435	31 and 31A, The Pantiles More images	Q26368109
33, The Pantiles	II	33, The Pantiles			20 May 1952	TQ5811138736; 51°07′34″N 0°15′29″E		1066564	33, The Pantiles More images	Q26319491
35 and 37, The Pantiles	II	35 and 37, The Pantiles			14 July 1988	TQ5810338739; 51°07′34″N 0°15′29″E		1226064	35 and 37, The Pantiles More images	Q26520102
38-46, The Pantiles	II	38-46, The Pantiles			20 May 1952	TQ5807938745; 51°07′34″N 0°15′27″E		1084442	38-46, The Pantiles More images	Q26368118
39 and 41, The Pantiles	II*	39 and 41, The Pantiles			20 May 1952	TQ5809838730; 51°07′34″N 0°15′28″E		1084436	39 and 41, The Pantiles More images	Q17547282
43, The Pantiles	II	43, The Pantiles			20 May 1952	TQ5809038725; 51°07′34″N 0°15′28″E		1084437	43, The Pantiles More images	Q26368110
45 and 47, The Pantiles	II	45 and 47, The Pantiles			20 May 1952	TQ5810938713; 51°07′33″N 0°15′29″E		1066573	45 and 47, The Pantiles More images	Q26319500
48, The Pantiles	II	48, The Pantiles			20 May 1952	TQ5807238731; 51°07′34″N 0°15′27″E		1084443	48, The Pantiles More images	Q26368120
5, The Pantiles	II	5, The Pantiles			20 May 1952	TQ5815938789; 51°07′36″N 0°15′32″E		1084433	5, The Pantiles More images	Q26368106
50 and 52, The Pantiles	II	50 and 52, The Pantiles			20 May 1952	TQ5806538720; 51°07′33″N 0°15′27″E		1065932	50 and 52, The Pantiles More images	Q26318956
51-55, The Pantiles	II	51-55, The Pantiles			20 May 1952	TQ5809438690; 51°07′32″N 0°15′28″E		1066555	51-55, The Pantiles More images	Q26319481
54 and 56, The Pantiles	II	54 and 56, The Pantiles			20 May 1952	TQ5806138713; 51°07′33″N 0°15′26″E		1338833	54 and 56, The Pantiles More images	Q26623125
60-72, The Pantiles	II	60-72, The Pantiles			20 May 1952	TQ5804138685; 51°07′32″N 0°15′25″E		1084444	60-72, The Pantiles More images	Q26368121
7, The Pantiles	II*	7, The Pantiles			20 May 1952	TQ5814738781; 51°07′35″N 0°15′31″E		1066598	7, The Pantiles More images	Q17547137
8 and 10, The Pantiles	II	8 and 10, The Pantiles			20 May 1952	TQ5813638807; 51°07′36″N 0°15′30″E		1084440	8 and 10, The Pantiles More images	Q26368115
9, The Pantiles	II	9, The Pantiles			14 July 1988	TQ5814038776; 51°07′35″N 0°15′31″E		1084421	9, The Pantiles More images	Q26368089
Durnford Lodge and Mansfield Lodge	II	27, Mount Sion, Tunbridge Wells			7 June 1974	TQ5839138811; 51°07′36″N 0°15′44″E		1084426	Upload Photo	Q26368096
Vicarage	II	11, York Road			7 June 1974	TQ5836339540; 51°08′00″N 0°15′43″E		1084414	Upload Photo	Q26368078
16-22, York Road	II	16-22, York Road			7 June 1974	TQ5836439563; 51°08′00″N 0°15′43″E		1084416	Upload Photo	Q26368081
40 and 42, York Road	II	40 and 42, York Road			7 June 1974	TQ5829839562; 51°08′00″N 0°15′40″E		1084417	Upload Photo	Q26368083
6-14, York Road	II	6-14, York Road			2 August 1974	TQ5839039565; 51°08′00″N 0°15′45″E		1226158	Upload Photo	Q26520188
Pavement To Bedford Terrace	II	Bedford Terrace			7 June 1974	TQ5826138825; 51°07′37″N 0°15′37″E		1281764	Pavement To Bedford Terrace More images	Q26570779
Mortuary Chapel To Tunbridge Wells Cemetery	II	Benhall Mill Road			7 June 1974	TQ5919937667; 51°06′58″N 0°16′23″E		1281729	Upload Photo	Q26570747
Church Of St Mark	II*	Broadwater Down			7 June 1974	TQ5769637572; 51°06′57″N 0°15′06″E		1083780	Church Of St Mark More images	Q7589914
Farnborough Lodge	II*	Calverley Park			20 May 1952	TQ5885539060; 51°07′44″N 0°16′08″E		1281705	Upload Photo	Q17547685
Keston Lodge	II*	Calverley Park			20 May 1952	TQ5882139481; 51°07′57″N 0°16′07″E		1083781	Upload Photo	Q17547235
Victoria Lodge	II*	Calverley Park			20 May 1952	TQ5869939407; 51°07′55″N 0°16′00″E		1203351	Upload Photo	Q17547421
Wall To South West Side Of Calverley Road Forming A Boundary To No 2 Calverley Park (The Cottage) Wall To South West Side Of Calverley Road Forming A Boundary To No 3 Calverley Park (The Little House) Wall To South West Side Of Calverley Road Forming A Boundary To No 4 Calverley Park (Sandhurst Lodge)	II	Calverley Road			7 June 1974	TQ5887139468; 51°07′57″N 0°16′09″E		1223602	Upload Photo	Q66477461
Chesterfield House	II	Camden Hill			7 June 1974	TQ5904838970; 51°07′41″N 0°16′18″E		1083755	Upload Photo	Q26366526
Oakfield Court	II	Camden Hill			7 June 1974	TQ5906639035; 51°07′43″N 0°16′19″E		1346504	Upload Photo	Q26630039
Oakfield Lodge	II	Camden Hill			7 June 1974	TQ5905838999; 51°07′41″N 0°16′18″E		1223603	Upload Photo	Q26517858
Former Clarence Public House	II	Church Road			7 June 1974	TQ5824839460; 51°07′57″N 0°15′37″E		1083761	Former Clarence Public House More images	Q26366559
The Priory	II	Church Road			24 November 1966	TQ5842439494; 51°07′58″N 0°15′46″E		1267213	Upload Photo	Q26557628
Trinity Arts Centre (Formerly Holy Trinity Church)	II*	Church Road			20 May 1952	TQ5837539492; 51°07′58″N 0°15′44″E		1223642	Trinity Arts Centre (Formerly Holy Trinity Church) More images	Q7842984
Wall Surrounding Holy Trinity Church On All Four Sides	II	Church Road			7 June 1974	TQ5837639471; 51°07′57″N 0°15′44″E		1083759	Wall Surrounding Holy Trinity Church On All Four Sides More images	Q26366549
Wall To North and South Of Nos 2 and 3	II	Church Road			7 June 1974	TQ5842139468; 51°07′57″N 0°15′46″E		1083758	Wall To North and South Of Nos 2 and 3 More images	Q26366544
Muxelwell Farm House	II	Cornford Lane			7 June 1974	TQ6082739965; 51°08′11″N 0°17′51″E		1338817	Upload Photo	Q26623109
Assembly Hall	II	Crescent Road			4 August 1995	TQ5853739473; 51°07′57″N 0°15′52″E		1265557	Upload Photo	Q4808663
Police Station and Courts	II	Crescent Road			4 August 1995	TQ5856339458; 51°07′57″N 0°15′53″E		1227046	Upload Photo	Q26520987
The Calverley Hotel	II	Crescent Road			24 November 1966	TQ5861239369; 51°07′54″N 0°15′56″E		1338818	Upload Photo	Q26623110
Two Bollards To The South West Of Calverley Park Crescent	II	Crescent Road			7 June 1974	TQ5871039422; 51°07′56″N 0°16′01″E		1338819	Upload Photo	Q26623111
Wall To North West Of The Calverley Hotel	II	Crescent Road			6 October 1972	TQ5859139393; 51°07′55″N 0°15′55″E		1084491	Upload Photo	Q26368186
Wall In Front Of No 7	II	Cumberland Walk			7 June 1974	TQ5826938740; 51°07′34″N 0°15′37″E		1084494	Upload Photo	Q26368190
Wall In Front Of Nos 4 and 5	II	Cumberland Walk			7 June 1974	TQ5824438767; 51°07′35″N 0°15′36″E		1338820	Upload Photo	Q26623112
Holst House	II	Dudley Road			7 June 1974	TQ5842739588; 51°08′01″N 0°15′47″E		1224186	Upload Photo	Q26518388
Ramslye Old Farm House	II	Eridge Road			7 June 1974	TQ5683237878; 51°07′07″N 0°14′22″E		1338782	Upload Photo	Q26623075
Caxton Cottage	II	Frog Lane			7 June 1974	TQ5835938844; 51°07′37″N 0°15′42″E		1084496	Upload Photo	Q26368193
Granite Surface To Frog Lane	II	Frog Lane			7 June 1974	TQ5833338861; 51°07′38″N 0°15′41″E		1224204	Upload Photo	Q26518402
Entrance To Grove Hill Gardens	II	Grove Hill Gardens			7 June 1974	TQ5880239048; 51°07′43″N 0°16′05″E		1338784	Upload Photo	Q26685075
The Pound	II	Grove Hill Road			24 November 1966	TQ5869339088; 51°07′45″N 0°16′00″E		1338804	Upload Photo	Q26623096
Packs In The Wood	II	Hilbert Road			11 December 1989	TQ5936440559; 51°08′32″N 0°16′36″E		1338822	Upload Photo	Q26623114
Church Of St Paul	II	Langton Road			7 June 1974	TQ5666439217; 51°07′51″N 0°14′15″E		1338857	Upload Photo	Q22661242
Former Tunbridge Wells West Railway Station	II	Linden Park Road			27 March 1986	TQ5786738463; 51°07′25″N 0°15′16″E		1126542	Upload Photo	Q7852851
Liptraps House	II	Liptraps Lane			21 May 2002	TQ5974541152; 51°08′50″N 0°16′57″E		1061387	Upload Photo	Q26314610
Pavement Between Nos 58 and 85	II	London Road			7 June 1974	TQ5816939436; 51°07′56″N 0°15′33″E		1084445	Pavement Between Nos 58 and 85 More images	Q26368123
The Church Of King Charles The Martyr	I	London Road			20 May 1952	TQ5819738810; 51°07′36″N 0°15′34″E		1084478	The Church Of King Charles The Martyr More images	Q6484295
Tunbridge Wells and Counties Club	II	London Road			7 June 1974	TQ5828939141; 51°07′47″N 0°15′39″E		1266427	Upload Photo	Q26556918
Two Lamp Supports Situated At The Junction Of Lonsdale Gardens and Mount Pleasant Road	II	Lonsdale Gardens			7 June 1974	TQ5845539300; 51°07′52″N 0°15′48″E		1084446	Two Lamp Supports Situated At The Junction Of Lonsdale Gardens and Mount Pleasant Road More images	Q26368124
York Cottage	II	Major York's Road			7 June 1974	TQ5800938733; 51°07′34″N 0°15′24″E		1084449	Upload Photo	Q26368128
8-36 Monson Road	II	8-36 Monson Road			7 June 1974	TQ5860439579; 51°08′01″N 0°15′56″E		1084450	Upload Photo	Q26368130
Opera Colonnade The Opera House With The Shops Below Numbers 84 To 96 and Numbers 38 To 50 Monson Road Including Numbers 38 To 50 Opera Colonnade	II	Monson Road			24 November 1966	TQ5851439598; 51°08′01″N 0°15′51″E		1338803	Upload Photo	Q6463096
Tunbridge Wells Adult Education Centre	II	Monson Road			24 November 1966	TQ5852539550; 51°08′00″N 0°15′52″E		1338838	Upload Photo	Q26623129
Mount Ephraim Post Office	II	Mount Ephraim			7 June 1974	TQ5826639787; 51°08′08″N 0°15′39″E		1225582	Upload Photo	Q26519666
Oakhurst Lodge	II	Mount Ephraim			7 June 1974	TQ5794339489; 51°07′58″N 0°15′22″E		1084459	Upload Photo	Q26368143
Pavement Between No 52 and 86 (The Chalet)	II	Mount Ephraim			7 June 1974	TQ5809139597; 51°08′02″N 0°15′29″E		1084462	Upload Photo	Q26368147
Lecture Hall Mount Pleasant Congregational Church	II*	Mount Ephriaim Road			20 May 1952	TQ5843939566; 51°08′00″N 0°15′47″E		1084464	Upload Photo	Q17547286
Archway Leading To Nos 2 and 3 (The Priory) Church Road	II	Mount Pleasant Road			24 November 1966	TQ5844839504; 51°07′58″N 0°15′48″E		1084465	Upload Photo	Q26368150
Library and Museum	II	Mount Pleasant Road			4 August 1995	TQ5849739536; 51°07′59″N 0°15′50″E		1227044	Upload Photo	Q26520985
Town Hall	II	Mount Pleasant Road			4 August 1995	TQ5849739470; 51°07′57″N 0°15′50″E		1265550	Town Hall More images	Q26556131
Tunbridge Wells War Memorial	II	Mount Pleasant Road			9 June 2011	TQ5847539521; 51°07′59″N 0°15′49″E		1401309	Upload Photo	Q26675477
Blenheim	II	Mount Sion			24 November 1966	TQ5830938863; 51°07′38″N 0°15′39″E		1084466	Upload Photo	Q26368152
Whiteleaf	II	Mount Sion			20 May 1952	TQ5837538821; 51°07′36″N 0°15′43″E		1338824	Upload Photo	Q26623116
K1 Telephone Kiosk Opposite Nevill Cricket and Athletic Ground Pavilion	II	Nevill Gate			13 January 1992	TQ5877038257; 51°07′18″N 0°16′02″E		1226095	Upload Photo	Q26520131
North Lodge	II	Nevill Park			7 June 1974	TQ5675539256; 51°07′52″N 0°14′20″E		1357136	Upload Photo	Q26639720
Blackhurst	II	Pembury Road			7 June 1974	TQ6054940174; 51°08′18″N 0°17′37″E		1084407	Upload Photo	Q26368068
Concord College	II	Pembury Road			7 June 1974	TQ5951939687; 51°08′03″N 0°16′43″E		1084406	Upload Photo	Q26368066
Holm Oaks The Woodlands Woodlands	II	Pembury Road			7 June 1974	TQ5944039659; 51°08′02″N 0°16′39″E		1338855	Upload Photo	Q26623145
Terrace Wall and Steps Of Dunorlan To The South East Of The Former Dunorlan House	II	Pembury Road			5 March 2009	TQ6001339673; 51°08′02″N 0°17′08″E		1393164	Upload Photo	Q26672348
Caenwood Farmhouse	II	Reynolds Lane			7 June 1974	TQ5773741099; 51°08′51″N 0°15′14″E		1338856	Upload Photo	Q26623146
Smockham Farmhouse	II	Reynolds Lane			20 May 1952	TQ5717640993; 51°08′48″N 0°14′45″E		1084408	Upload Photo	Q26368069
Pembury Grange	II	Sandown Park			25 May 1983	TQ6106940856; 51°08′40″N 0°18′05″E		1126529	Upload Photo	Q26419472
Grove Villa	II	South Grove			7 June 1974	TQ5844138955; 51°07′41″N 0°15′46″E		1084412	Upload Photo	Q26368075
Church Of St James	II	St James Road			7 June 1974	TQ5915439826; 51°08′08″N 0°16′24″E		1084410	Upload Photo	Q26368072
Canon Hoare Memorial	II	St John's Road			7 June 1974	TQ5828840132; 51°08′19″N 0°15′40″E		1084411	Upload Photo	Q26368074
Church Of St John	II	St John's Road			7 June 1974	TQ5827340320; 51°08′25″N 0°15′40″E		1065904	Upload Photo	Q26318928
Parish Church Of St Barnabas	II*	Stanley Road			7 June 1974	TQ5887840146; 51°08′19″N 0°16′11″E		1338860	Upload Photo	Q17547780
The Sussex Arms Public House	II	Sussex Mews			7 June 1974	TQ5812638670; 51°07′32″N 0°15′30″E		1065868	The Sussex Arms Public House More images	Q26318896
Coldbath Farmhouse	II	Tea Garden Lane			7 June 1974	TQ5630138647; 51°07′33″N 0°13′56″E		1084413	Upload Photo	Q26368077
Ephraim Lodge	II	The Common			24 November 1966	TQ5793539269; 51°07′51″N 0°15′21″E		1084489	Upload Photo	Q26368183
Gilbraltar Cottage and Rocklea	II	The Common			20 January 1971	TQ5810839537; 51°08′00″N 0°15′30″E		1084487	Gilbraltar Cottage and Rocklea More images	Q26368180
Mount Edgcombe	II	The Common			24 November 1966	TQ5791739296; 51°07′52″N 0°15′20″E		1084488	Upload Photo	Q26368182
Mount Edgcumbe Cottage	II	The Common			24 November 1966	TQ5792839280; 51°07′52″N 0°15′21″E		1338816	Upload Photo	Q26623108
Entrance To Grove Hill Gardens	II	The Grove			7 June 1974	TQ5862938989; 51°07′42″N 0°15′56″E		1224433	Upload Photo	Q26518615
Colonnade Between Nos 28 and 38	II	The Pantiles			7 June 1974	TQ5809938761; 51°07′35″N 0°15′29″E		1065996	Colonnade Between Nos 28 and 38 More images	Q26319013
Pavement To The Pantiles	II	The Pantiles			7 June 1974	TQ5806238702; 51°07′33″N 0°15′27″E		1338854	Pavement To The Pantiles More images	Q26623144
The Old Fishmarket	II	The Pantiles			14 July 1988	TQ5811638749; 51°07′34″N 0°15′29″E		1084422	The Old Fishmarket More images	Q26368090
Tiled Pavement To The Pantiles	II	The Pantiles			7 June 1974	TQ5806538690; 51°07′32″N 0°15′27″E		1084405	Upload Photo	Q26368065
Tunbridge Wells Central Railway Station Up Side	II	Vale Road			7 June 1974	TQ5843039204; 51°07′49″N 0°15′46″E		1357467	Upload Photo	Q26639991
Holy Trinity Church Hall	II	York Road			7 June 1974	TQ5834939539; 51°08′00″N 0°15′43″E		1084415	Upload Photo	Q26368080
York Road Meeting Room	II	York Road			7 June 1974	TQ5824639533; 51°08′00″N 0°15′37″E		1065884	Upload Photo	Q26318910
Wall To North East Side Of Calverley Road, Forming A Boundary To No 2 Calverley Park Gardens, The Bungalow and Nos 4 To 16 Calverley Park Gardens	II	Calverley Road			7 June 1974	TQ5891839460; 51°07′57″N 0°16′12″E		1083753	Upload Photo	Q26366517
Pulhamite Cascade, Stepping Stones and Bridge In Water Garden, Dunorlan Park	II	Pembury Road			5 March 2009	TQ6018339562; 51°07′59″N 0°17′17″E		1393168	Upload Photo	Q26672352
Wall To North West Side Of Prospect Road Forming Boundary Walls To Stone Garage, Nos 1 and 3 Prospect Road and Nos 12 To 24 (Consecutive) Galverley Park	II	Prospect Road			6 September 1976	TQ5895139089; 51°07′44″N 0°16′13″E		1227020	Upload Photo	Q26520966
Memorial To George Whitfield	II				7 June 2000	TQ5827639881; 51°08′11″N 0°15′39″E		1380348	Upload Photo	Q26660553
Palmers Green Farmhouse	II				7 June 1974	TQ6092838263; 51°07′16″N 0°17′53″E		1083776	Upload Photo	Q26366622
Southborough Or Colesbrook Railway Viaduct	II				20 May 1952	TQ5949642800; 51°09′44″N 0°16′47″E		1203275	Upload Photo	Q26305744
Wall and War Memorial In Front Of St Paul's Church	II				7 June 1974	TQ5665639267; 51°07′53″N 0°14′15″E		1084409	Upload Photo	Q26368071

== See also ==
- Grade I listed buildings in Kent
- Grade II* listed buildings in Kent

== Sources ==
- Newman, John (2012) [1969], Kent: West and the Weald, The Buildings of England, New Haven and London: Yale University Press, ISBN 978-0-300-18509-6
