= Church of King Charles the Martyr =

Church of King Charles the Martyr may refer to:

- Church of King Charles the Martyr, Falmouth, Cornwall
- Church of King Charles the Martyr, Royal Tunbridge Wells, Kent

== See also ==
- Charles Church, Plymouth, Devon
