= Beddard =

Beddard is a surname, and may refer to:

- Frank Evers Beddard (1858–1925), English zoologist
- Jamie Beddard (born 1966), British theatrical writer, actor and director
- Robert Beddard, British historian
- Terry Beddard (1901–1966), British fencer
