= Jowitt =

Jowitt is a surname. Notable people with the surname include:

- Cameron Jowitt (born 1983), Samoan/New Zealand Rugby Union footballer
- Claire Jowitt, English academic who writes on race, cross-gender, piracy, identity, empire and performance
- Deborah Jowitt, American dance critic, author, and choreographer
- Edwin Jowitt, (born 1929), British former High Court judge
- Glenn Jowitt (1955–2014), New Zealand photographer who specialized in the people and cultures of the Pacific Islands
- Ken Jowitt, American political scientist
- Paul Jowitt CBE, Professor of Civil Engineering Systems at Heriot Watt University, executive director of the Scottish Institute of Sustainable Technology
- Robin Jowitt, rugby league footballer who played in the 2000s
- Warren Jowitt (born 1974) rugby league footballer who played in the 1990s and 2000s
- William Jowitt, 1st Earl Jowitt PC, KC (1885–1957), British Labour politician, lawyer, Lord High Chancellor of Great Britain from 1945 to 1951, author of Jowitt's Dictionary of English Law

== See also ==
- Joe Witte
- John Witt
