= Royal Martyr Church Union =

The Royal Martyr Church Union (RMCU) is a Church of England devotional society dedicated to the restoration of the observance of King Charles the Martyr in the calendar of the Book of Common Prayer. It was founded in 1906 by Captain Henry Stuart Wheatly-Crowe (1882-1967). Like the Society of King Charles the Martyr, the RMCU hosts an annual commemoration of the beheading of Charles I of England. It has historically had close connections with Jacobitism. Among other activities, the RMCU funded the construction of the Church of King Charles the Martyr in Potters Bar in the Diocese of St Albans. The current headquarters of the RMCU is at St Albans in Hertfordshire.

== Bibliography ==
- The Royal Martyr Annual, 1932—

== See also ==
- Jacobitism
- Ritualism
- Oxford Movement
