= Modern Vices =

- Origin: Chicago, Illinois
- Genres: Rock and roll, crooner, lo-fi indie, garage, surf
- Years active: 2013–present
- Labels: Autumn Tone Records
- Members: Alex Rebek; Patrick Hennessey; Peter Scoville; Thomas Peters; Miles Kalchik
- Website: www.modernvices.com

Modern Vices are an American rock band from Chicago, Illinois.

== History ==
Modern Vices began in 2013. The members all dropped out of college to pursue music full-time. In 2014, Modern Vices released their self-titled debut album in October 2014. In 2017, Modern Vices released a new song titled "If Only". In 2019, Modern Vices released a new song titled "All You Got'. In 2019, Modern Vices released a new song titled "Not a Problem'. In 2019, Modern Vices released their second album in October 2019.

== Band members ==
- Alex Rebek (vocals)
- Patrick Hennessey (drums)
- Peter Scoville (guitar)
- Thomas Peters (guitar)
- Miles Kalchik (bass)

== Discography ==
Studio albums

- Modern Vices (2014, Autumn Tone Records)
- If Only (2019, Modern Vices)
