= King Charles the Martyr =

Title of Charles I of England, Scotland and Ireland

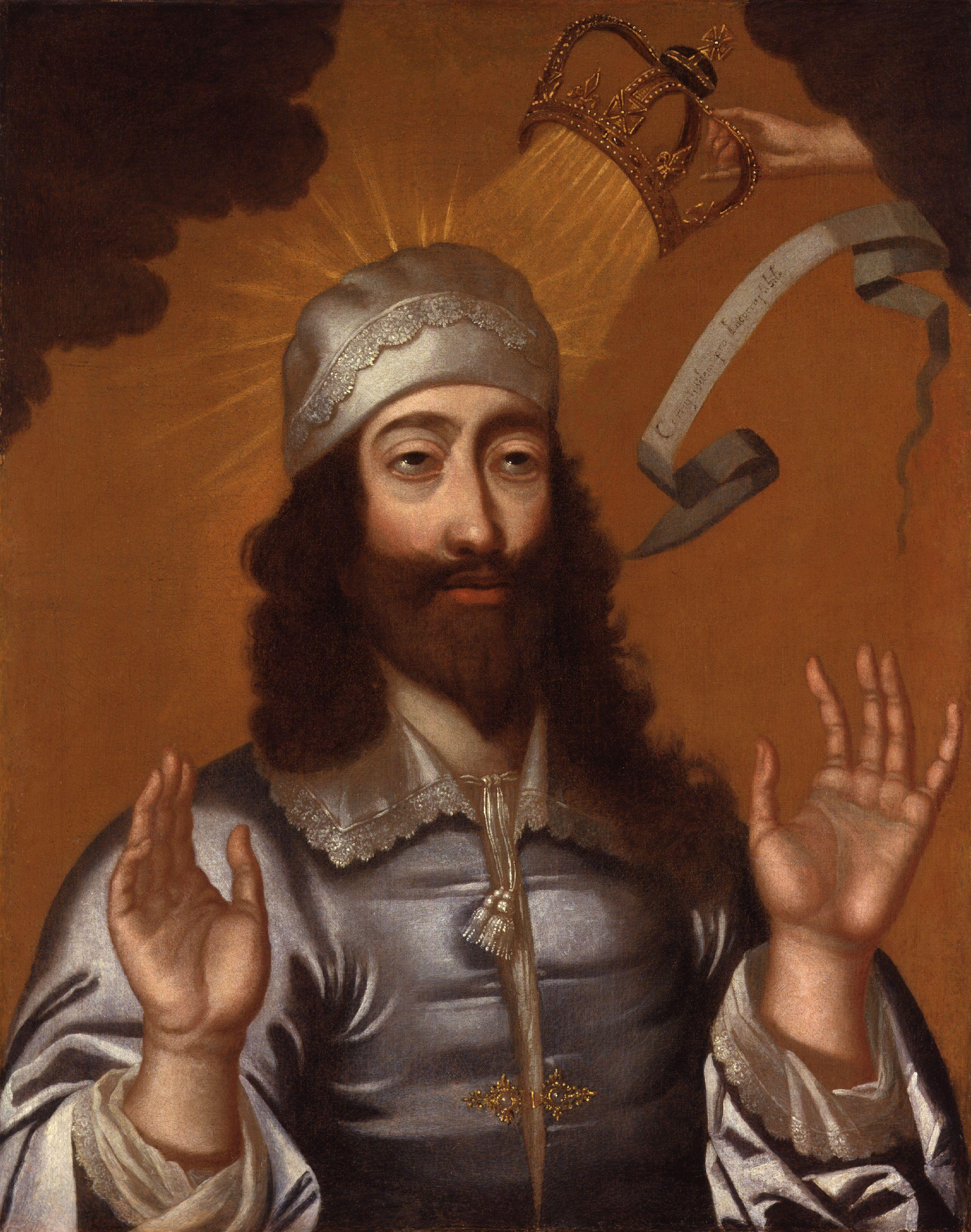
- A devotional image of Charles I by unknown artist, early 18th century

King and Martyr
- Born: 19 November 1600; Dunfermline Palace, Dunfermline, Scotland
- Died: 30 January 1649 (aged 48); Whitehall, London, England
- Venerated in: Anglo-Catholicism; Roman Catholic Personal ordinariate
- Canonized: 19 May 1660, Convocations of Canterbury and York by Church of England
- Major shrine: St George's Chapel, Windsor Castle, England
- Feast: 30 January
- Patronage: Society of King Charles the Martyr

King Charles the Martyr, or Charles, King and Martyr, is a title of Charles I, who was King of England, Scotland and Ireland from 1625 until his execution on 30 January 1649. The title is used by high church Anglicans who regard Charles's execution as a martyrdom. His feast day in the Anglican calendar of saints is 30 January, the anniversary of his execution in 1649.

The observance was one of several "state services" removed in 1859 from the Book of Common Prayer of the Church of England and the Church of Ireland. There remain some churches and parishes dedicated to Charles the Martyr, and his cult is maintained by some Anglo-Catholic societies, including the Society of King Charles the Martyr founded in 1894 and the Royal Martyr Church Union founded in 1906.

== Reign ==
Charles I, head of the House of Stuart, was King of England, Scotland, and Ireland from 27 March 1625, until his death on 30 January 1649. He believed in a sacramental version of the Church of England, called High Anglicanism, with a theology based upon Arminianism, a belief shared by his main political advisor, Archbishop William Laud. Laud was appointed by Charles as the Archbishop of Canterbury in 1633 and started a series of reforms in the Church to make it more ceremonial.

This was actively hostile to the Reformist tendencies of many of his English and Scottish subjects. He rejected the Calvinism of the Presbyterians, insisted on an episcopal (hierarchical) form of church government as opposed to presbyterian or congregational forms, and required that the Church of England's liturgy be celebrated with all of the ceremony and vestments called for by the 1604 Book of Common Prayer.

Many of his subjects thought these policies brought the Church of England too close to Roman Catholicism. The Parliament of England objected both to Charles's religious policies and to his Personal Rule from 1629 to 1640, during which he never summoned Parliament. These disputes contributed to the English Civil War.

== Trial and execution ==
After the royalists were defeated by the Parliamentarians, Charles was put on trial. He was charged with attempting to govern as an absolute monarch rather than in combination with Parliament; with fighting against his people; with continuing the war after the defeat of his forces (the Second English Civil War); with conspiring after defeat to promote yet another continuation; and with encouraging his troops to kill prisoners of war. He was sentenced to death by beheading.

There is some historical debate over the identity of the man who beheaded the King, who was masked at the scene. It is known the regicides approached Richard Brandon, the common Hangman of London, but that he refused, and contemporary sources do not generally identify him as the King's headsman. Ellis's Historical Inquiries, however, name him as the executioner, reporting that he stated so before dying.

It is possible he relented and agreed to do the deed, but there are others who have been identified. William Hewlett was tried for the murder after the Restoration and convicted. In 1661, two people identified as "Dayborne and Bickerstaffe" were arrested but then discharged. Henry Walker, a revolutionary journalist, or his brother William, were suspected but never charged. Various local legends around England name local figures.

According to Philip Henry, the decapitation was greeted by a moan from the assembled crowd, some of whom then dipped their handkerchiefs in Charles' blood, thus starting the cult of the Martyr King. Henry was a royalist propagandist; neither Samuel Pepys nor any other eyewitness source corroborate him.

It was common practice for the head of a traitor to be held up and exhibited to the crowd with the words "Behold the head of a traitor!" Although Charles's head was exhibited, the words were not used. In an unprecedented gesture, one of the prominent leaders of the revolutionaries, Oliver Cromwell, allowed the King's head to be sewn back on his body so the family could pay its respects. Charles was buried privately and at night on 7 February 1649, in the Henry VIII vault inside St George's Chapel in Windsor Castle. The King's son, King Charles II, later planned an elaborate royal mausoleum which was never built.

== Martyrdom ==
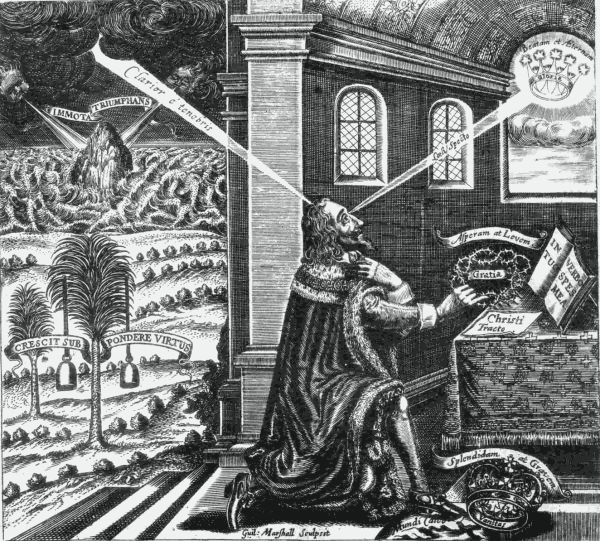
The Eikon Basilike, a purported spiritual autobiography attributed to Charles I, published days after his execution

Charles is regarded by many members of the Church of England as a martyr because, it is said, he was offered his life if he would abandon the historic episcopacy in the Church of England. It is said he refused, believing that the Church of England was truly "Catholic" and should maintain the Catholic episcopate. His designation in the Church of England's calendar is "Charles, King and Martyr, 1649".

Mandell Creighton, Bishop of London, wrote "Had Charles been willing to abandon the Church and give up episcopacy, he might have saved his throne and his life. But on this point Charles stood firm: for this he died, and by dying saved it for the future." Charles had already made an Engagement with the Scots to introduce Presbyterianism in England for three years in return for the aid of Scots forces in the Second English Civil War.

Both high church Anglicans and royalists fashioned an image of martyrdom, and after the 1660 Restoration of the monarchy the Church of England's Convocations of Canterbury and York added the date of Charles's martyrdom to its liturgical calendar (Lesser Festival).

== Observance ==
The Calendar of the Book of Common Prayer included among the red letter days "state services" commemorations of the Gunpowder Plot, the birth and restoration of Charles II, and the execution of Charles I. A proclamation made at the beginning of each reign from Charles II to Victoria annexed special services for these days to the Prayer Book by royal mandate, approved unanimously by Convocation. Special sermons were preached, and hundreds of sermons on King Charles the Martyr were printed from the 1660s until the late eighteenth century. The title of the service for 30 January was:

A FORM OF PRAYER WITH FASTING,
To be used yearly on the Thirtieth of January,
Being the Day of the Martyrdom of the Blessed King CHARLES the First;
to implore the mercy of God, that neither the Guilt of that sacred and innocent Blood, nor those other sins, by which God was provoked to deliver up both us and our King into the hands of cruel and unreasonable men, may at any time hereafter be visited upon us or our posterity.

In 1859, the State Services were omitted from the Prayer Book by royal and parliamentary authority but without the consent of Convocation. Vernon Staley in 1907 described the deletion as ultra vires and "a distinct violation of the compact between Church and Realm, as set forth in the Act of Uniformity which imposed the Book of Common Prayer in 1662". Of the three commemorations, only that of King Charles I has been restored in the calendar in the Alternative Service Book of 1980 – although not as a Red Letter Day – and a new collect composed for Common Worship in 2000. The Society of King Charles the Martyr campaigns for restoration in England of the observance to the Book of Common Prayer. It is included in some of the calendars of other Churches of the Anglican Communion.

== Dedications ==
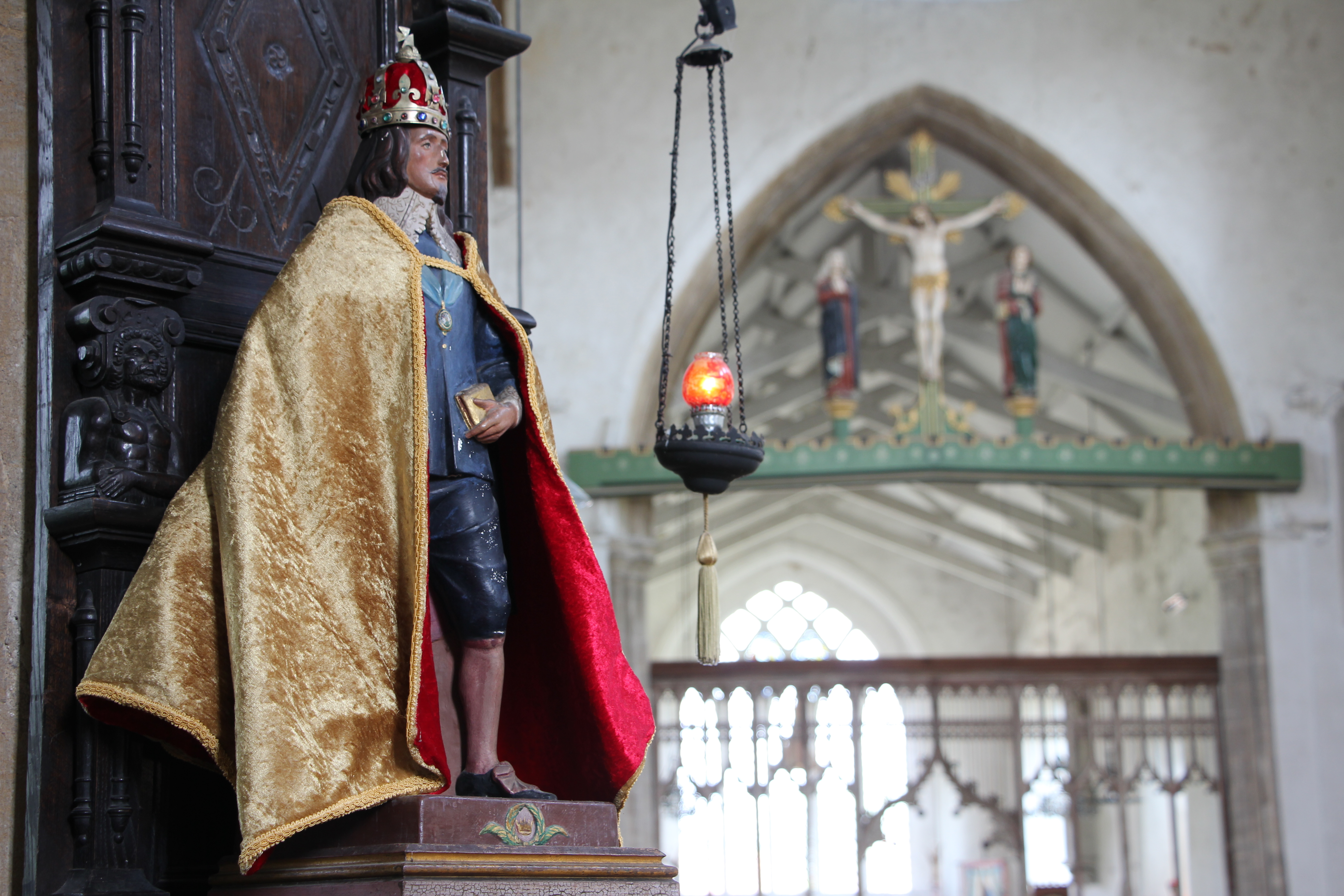
Devotional statue in St Mary's Church, South Creake, Norfolk, England

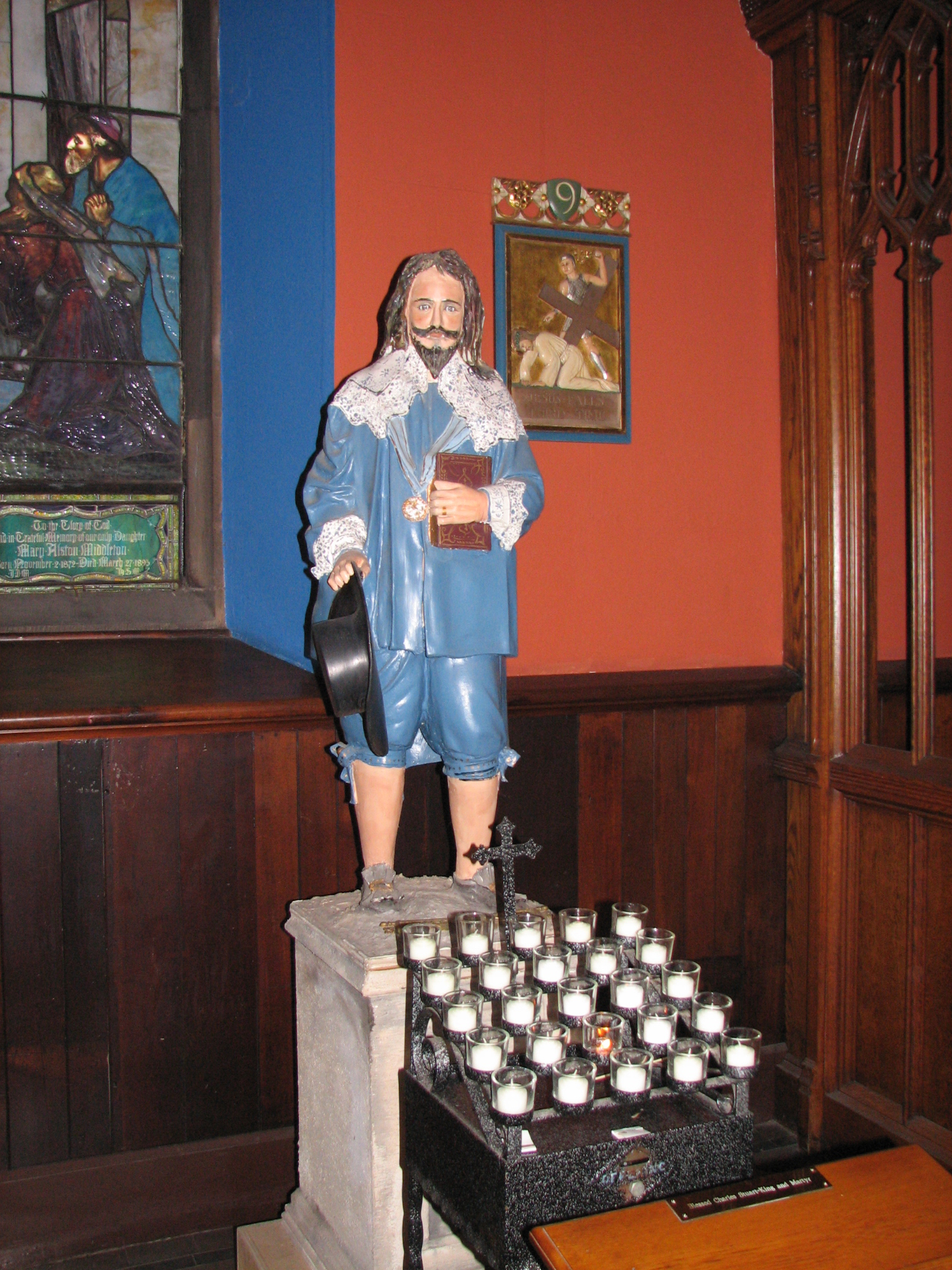
Statue of King Charles the Martyr at Grace and St. Peter's Church (Baltimore, Maryland), US

There are Anglican churches and chapels dedicated to Charles King and Martyr in England, Scotland, Ireland, the United States, Australia, and South Africa. The six in England are:

- Church of King Charles the Martyr, Falmouth, Cornwall
- Church of King Charles the Martyr, Peak Forest, Derbyshire
- Church of King Charles the Martyr, Potters Bar, Hertfordshire
- Church of King Charles the Martyr, Royal Tunbridge Wells, Kent
- Church of King Charles the Martyr, Newton-in-Wem, Shropshire
- Church of King Charles the Martyr, Shelland, Suffolk

Other churches include:

- Charles Church, Plymouth – not dedicated to Charles as martyr; Charles himself demanded it be named for himself for his financial support. Destroyed in the Blitz; only ruins remain.
- Chapel of the Royal Hospital, Kilmainham, Dublin, Ireland
- St Charles, King and Martyr Anglican Church, Huntsville, Alabama, US
- The Episcopal Church of St. Andrew & St. Charles, Granada Hills, California, US

Former dedications include the Tangier Garrison chapel in 17th-century English Tangier, and a missionary chapel in Wakkanai established by United States Forces Japan personnel.

== See also ==
- Calves' Head Club, which celebrated 30 January in mockery of Charles's death
- Eikon Basilike
- "On the Martyrdom of King Charles I", sermon by Jonathan Swift
