= James Wellwood (physician) =

James Wellwood (1652 – 2 April 1727) was a Scottish physician.

== Biography ==
He was born in Dunfermline, Fifeshire, Scotland, the son of Rev James Welwood of Fifeshire and his wife, Mary Dury, was born in 1652 and educated at St Andrews University. He went to Holland in 1679, and is said to have graduated M.D. at Leyden, but his name does not appear in Peacock's "Index." He returned to England with William III and, on 22 December 1690, then being physician to King William and Queen Mary, was elected a fellow of the College of Physicians of London. He was elected a censor of the college in 1722. A letter of his to the lady mayoress on the case of Mary Maillard, a girl lame from birth, was published in London in 1694. Jane Shaw notes that Wellwood took an indecisive approach. This was an enlightened time and the illogical existence of miracles raised questions. Wellwood noted that the atheists and enthusiasts could decide their approach easily he found it difficult to take a side on this happening that was "above the road of nature".

In 1689 he published a "Vindication of the Revolution in England," and an "Answer to the late King James's Last Declaration" (2nd edit. 1693). These were followed in 1700 by "Memoirs of the most Material Transactions in England for the last Hundred Years preceding the Revolution in 1688," which contains several original accounts and an able statement of the whig case. Four authorised editions appeared before 1710, and one after that date, and there were also several pirated editions. In 1710 he published "The Banquet of Xenophon," with an introductory essay on the death of Socrates, dedicated to Lady Jean Douglas, eldest daughter of the Duke of Queensberry and Dover. His house was in York Buildings, near the Strand, and he died there on 2 April 1727. He was buried in the church of St. Martin's-in-the-Fields.
