= Robert Beddard =

British historian

Robert Anthony Beddard (born 1939) FRHistS is a British historian.

Beddard was, until 2006, the Cowen Fellow and Tutor in Modern History, Oriel College, Oxford.

== Life ==
He is the son of J. E. Beddard, and was educated at Brierley Hill Grammar School. He graduated B.A. at the University of London, and M.A. at Cambridge. He was a fellow of Queens' College, Cambridge from 1965 to 1968. A D.Phil. at Oxford in 1966, in 1968 he was elected a Fellow of Oriel College, Oxford.

Beddard is a Fellow of the Royal Historical Society. His research interests lie in 17th century British politics and religion, and include relations between Stuart England and Rome.

== Publications ==
- 'The Restoration Church' in The Restored Monarchy, 1660-1688 (ed. J.R. Jones), (1978)
- A Kingdom Without a King: The Journal of the Provisional Government in the Revolution of 1688. (Oxford, 1988)
- The Revolutions of 1688. (Oxford, 1991)
- Restoration Oxford', 'Tory Oxford', and 'James II and the Catholic challenge in The History of the University of Oxford, IV: Seventeenth-Century Oxford (ed. N. Tyacke), (Oxford, 1997)
- 'A Traitor's gift: Hugh Peter's donation to the Bodleian Library', The Bodleian Library Record. Vol 16 (1999) pp. 374–90
- 'Pope Clement X's inauguration of the Holy Year of 1675', Archivum Historiae Pontificiae. Vol 30 (2000)
- 'Six Unpublished Letters of Queen Henrietta Maria', The British Library Journal. Vol 25 (2000) pp. 129–43
- 'Isaac Basire: The Bodleian Library's first foreign reader', The Bodleian Library Record. (2003)

=== Criticism ===
- "Robert Beddard looks at two books on the decisive turning point of 1688.", History Today, June 2006, Volume: 56 Issue: 6, Page 62-62
