= Church of King Charles the Martyr, Royal Tunbridge Wells =

Church in Kent, England

Church of King Charles the Martyr
- Church of King Charles the Martyr
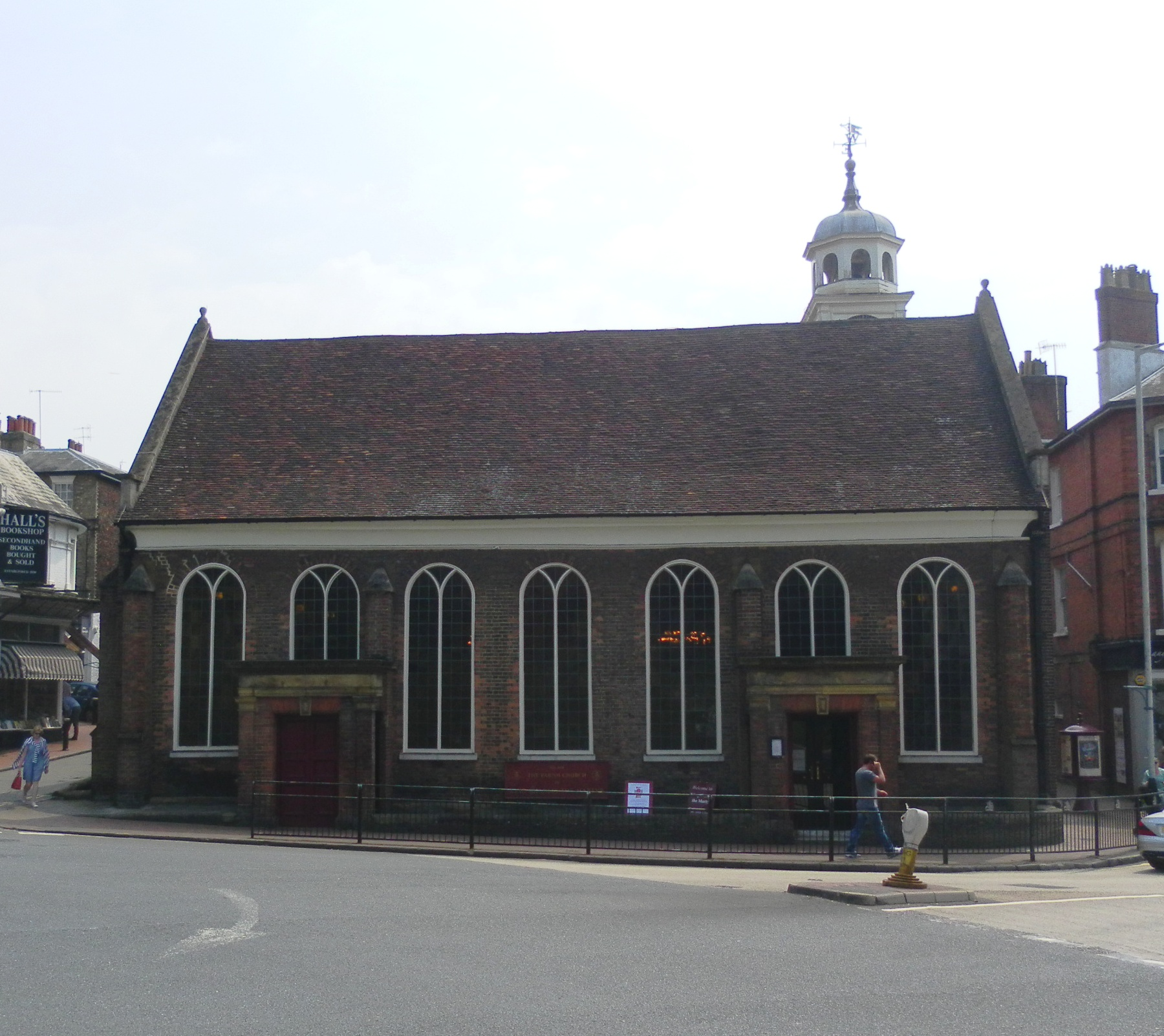
- Church of King Charles the Martyr
- 51.1268°N 0.2593°E
- OS grid reference: TQ 58197 38810
- Location: Royal Tunbridge Wells
- Country: England
- Denomination: Church of England

History
- Status: parish church
- Founded: 1676
- Dedication: King Charles the Martyr

Architecture
- Functional status: Active
- Heritage designation: Grade I
- Architect: Thomas Neale
- Architectural type: Chapel
- Completed: 1676

Specifications
- Materials: Red brick

Administration
- Province: Canterbury
- Diocese: Rochester
- Deanery: Tunbridge Wells
- Parish: King Charles the Martyr

The Church of King Charles the Martyr is a Church of England parish church in Royal Tunbridge Wells, Kent, England. It is a Grade I listed building.

== History ==
In the 1670s, Tunbridge Wells had few permanent structures when it started to receive visits from members of the English Royal Family. The church was built on land belonging to Viscountess Purbeck as a chapel of ease for those visiting The Pantiles and was opened in 1676 after being constructed by Thomas Neale. It was dedicated to King Charles the Martyr: the cult of Charles I, who was executed in 1649 and whose son Charles II had been restored in 1660. While it was a chapel of ease, it served the parishes of Frant, Speldhurst and Tonbridge.

When it was built, the church was the first substantial building constructed in Tunbridge Wells. The church had no resident vicar until 1709, and relied on visiting clergymen to conduct services. As Tunbridge Wells expanded, so did the church. After new parishes were created for the expanding town, the position of the chapel became an anomaly and it eventually became itself a parish church in 1889, but with an unusually small parochial area. It had been visited by the young Queen Victoria with her mother the Duchess of Kent, and a plaque was installed to commemorate this on the pew they sat in.

== Design ==
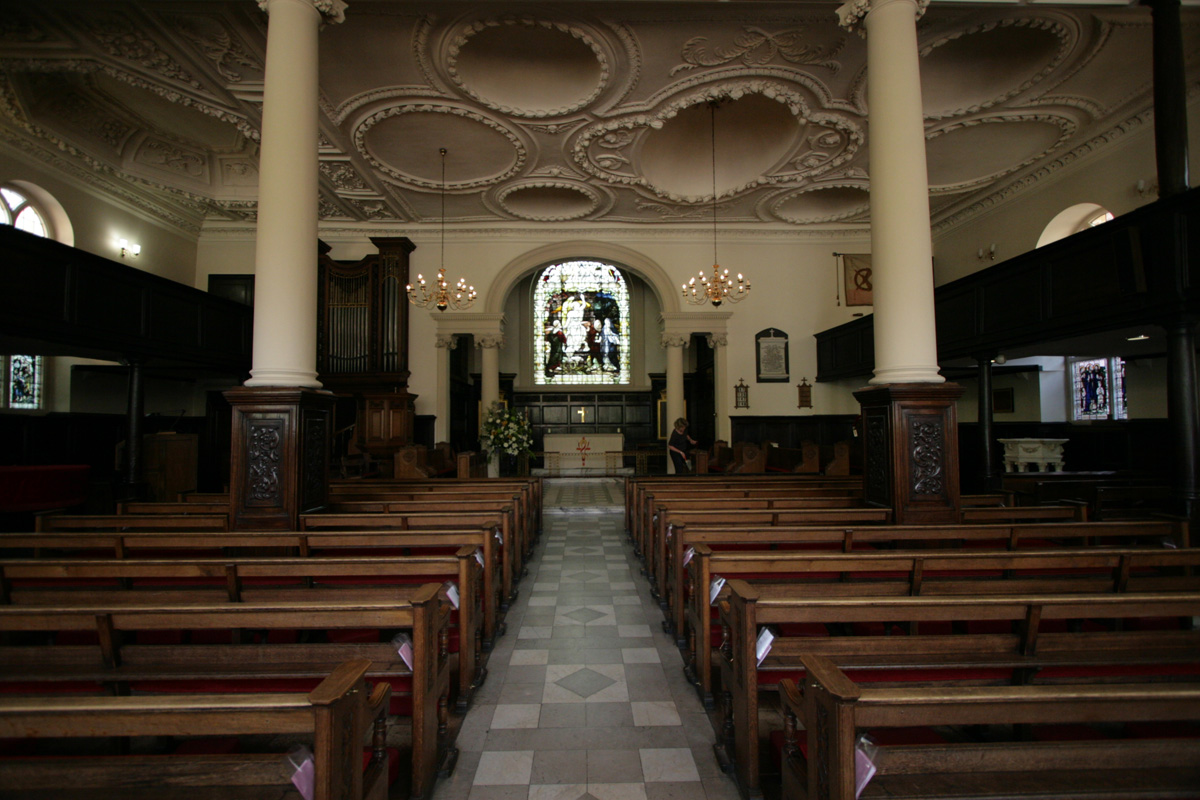
The interior of the church

The church was built using red bricks. The ceilings inside are made of plaster with five domes and were designed in 1678 by John Wetherell. In 1688, Henry Doogood, the chief plasterer of Sir Christopher Wren, expanded it. In 1846, a vestry and a schoolroom was added. In 1882, Ewan Christian re-orientated the church while adding a chancel and reinforcing the church with steel. The panels either side of the altar in the new chancel came from a demolished church designed by Christopher Wren, St. Antholin, Budge Row, in the City of London.

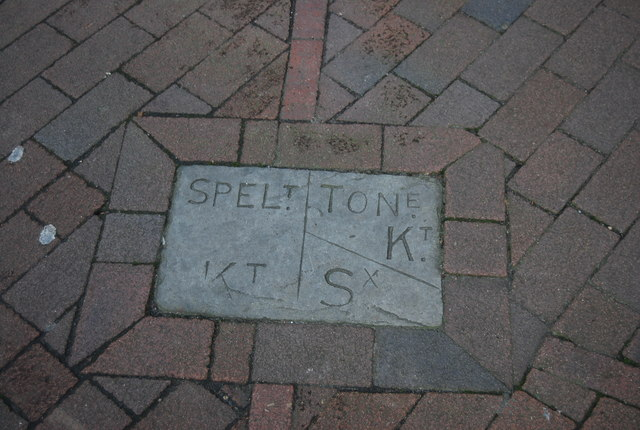
The boundary stone

Outside the church is a stone set into the pavement which marked the parish boundaries of Speldhurst, Tonbridge and Frant, and also of Kent and Sussex before the county boundaries were redrawn.

In 1969, Lawrence Lee produced The Ruth Window, a small two-light window with the figure of Ruth in one light and her work - gleaning in the fields - in the other.

== See also ==
- List of places of worship in Tunbridge Wells (borough)
