= John Witt =

American baseball collector (born 1969)

- Born: August 25, 1969 (age 57); Elmhurst, Illinois, U.S.
- Occupations: Collector and author
- Known for: Collecting baseballs

John Witt (born August 25, 1969) is an American baseball collector and author. He claims to have caught over 5,000 baseballs at professional baseball games over the past 40 years. Witt is also an author, baseball columnist, and actor.

== Early life ==
Witt was born on August 25, 1969. He caught his first ball at age seven, during a Chicago White Sox game at Comiskey Park in 1977. For over two decades, Witt has worked for minor league teams as a clubhouse attendant, concession stand manager, and operations director; he has also handled marketing and sales. He has also edited math textbooks, and openly admits having sold many of the balls he has caught for cash.

== Baseball collecting ==
Witt claims to have collected over 5,000 baseballs at professional baseball games for over 45 years, starting in 1977, when he snagged his first baseball. Almost 4,000 of those are Major League baseballs (MLB). 101 of the MLB balls are actual game home runs from Major League baseball games.

On September 13, 1998, he grabbed Sammy Sosa's 61st home run ball at Wrigley Field in Chicago. Witt was actually not in the ballpark that day, but was outside of left field standing on the corner of Waveland Avenue and Kenmore Street. The ball came out, just missing the apartment building across the street, bounced off a man's shin, and then rolled right into Witt's glove. Several regulars surrounded him and hustled him into the van of Moe Mullins, a fellow ballhawk, for safety. Witt spent the next 30 minutes doing interviews and signing autographs. He even had a visit from Jeff Idleson of the Baseball Hall of Fame to authenticate the ball. Initially turning down a reported five-figure sum, Witt later sold the ball for $7,500 to a collector in Chicago, who returned the ball to Sosa one week later.

Witt has also caught other memorable and historic home run balls over the years, including Dave Winfield's 450th career home run, Bob Boone's 100th career home run, Dante Bichette's first career home run, Derek Jeter's home run in game 3 of the 2003 ALCS, Kevin Mitchell's home run in the 1989 NLCS, and home runs hit by Baseball Hall of Famer Eddie Murray from both sides of the plate in the same game in 1987.

== Acting ==
Witt has appeared in various films and advertisements. He appeared as an extra in a 1992 film about baseball star Babe Ruth, titled The Babe. In 2004, he appeared in a MasterCard commercial featuring Boston Red Sox fans telling what they would give up for World Series tickets. He also appeared in advertisements for Levi Strauss & Co. in 1990.

== Charitable work ==
In 2009 Witt worked with the Orange County, California chapter of Mothers Against Drunk Driving to create Baseballs 4 MADD. Pledges were made for each baseball that Witt caught during the 2009 baseball season. Catching a total of 113 in 2009, Witt helped raise $778 for MADD's mission to stop drunk driving, support the victims of this violent crime, and prevent underage drinking.

== Writing ==
Witt's book, Taking Home a Piece of the Game, was self-published through Createspace in 2009. Witt is also a columnist for the website Mygameballs.com and has written articles for various other baseball outlets.
