= Hugh Peter =

English preacher (1598-1660)

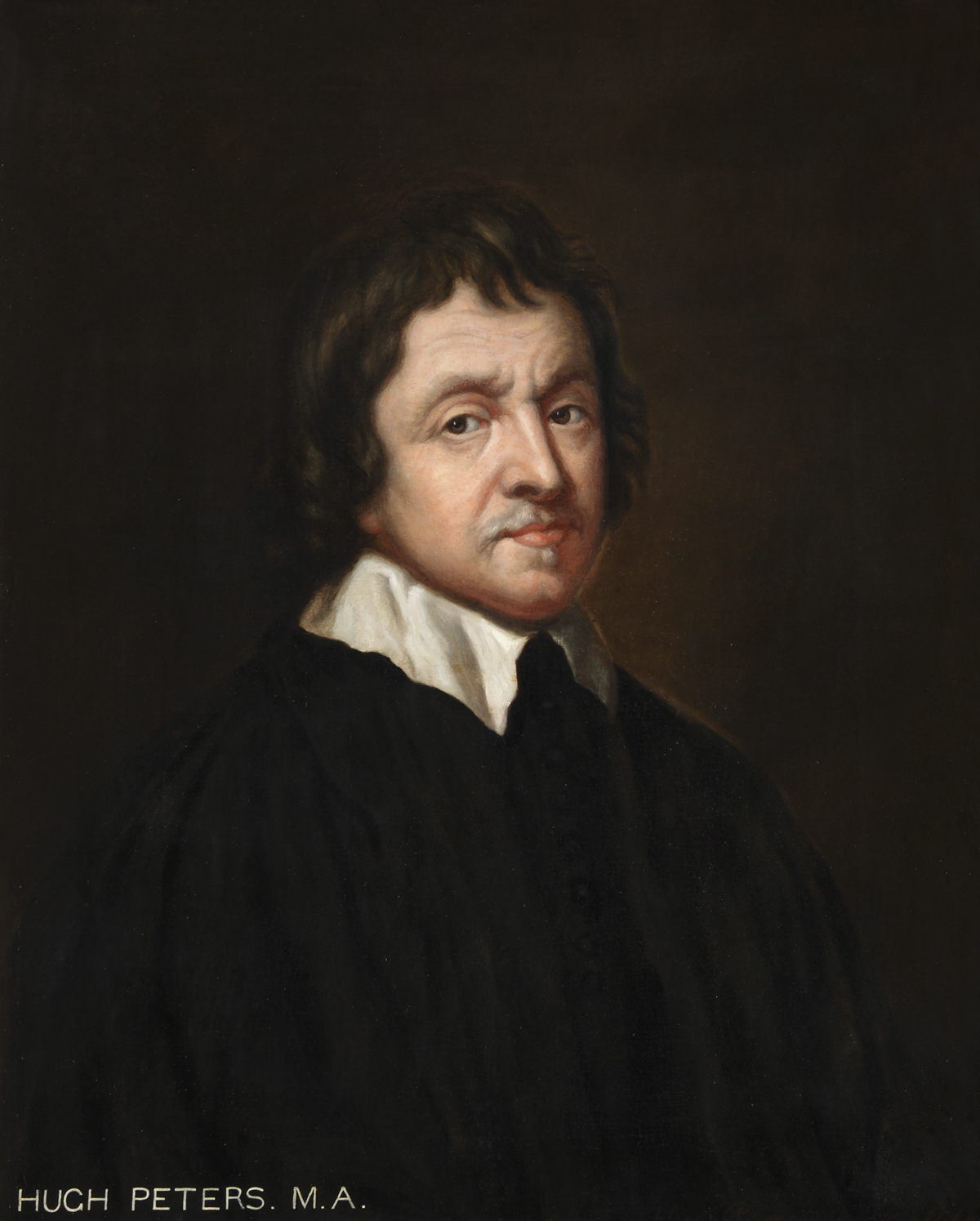
- Born: 29 June 1598; Fowey, Cornwall, England
- Died: 16 October 1660 (aged 62); Charing Cross London, England
- Cause of death: Execution by hanging, drawing and quartering
- Education: Trinity College, Cambridge
- Occupation: Independent Preacher
- Known for: Chaplain in New Model Army, Parliamentarian, regicide, New England colonist

Hugh Peter (or Peters) (baptized 29 June 1598 – 16 October 1660) was an English preacher, political advisor and soldier who supported the Parliamentary cause during the English Civil War and later the trial and execution of Charles I. Following the Restoration, he was executed as a regicide.

Peter became highly influential during the English Civil War. He employed a flamboyant preaching style that was considered highly effective in furthering the interests of the Puritan cause.

From a radically Protestant family of Cornwall, England, though of part Dutch origin, Peter emigrated to a Puritan colony in America, where he first rose to prominence. After spending time in Holland, he returned to England and became a close associate and propagandist for Oliver Cromwell, a contemporary of Peter at Cambridge University. Peter may have been the first to propose the trial and execution of Charles I and was believed to have assisted at the beheading.

Peter unsuccessfully proposed revolutionary changes that would have disestablished the Church of England's role in landholding and struck at the heart of the legal title to property. Disagreeing with the war against Protestant Holland and increasingly excluded after Cromwell's death, Peter's former outspokenness and role in the execution of Charles I meant he faced reprisal following the Restoration and he was hanged, drawn and quartered as a regicide.

== Early life ==
Coat of Arms of Hugh Peter

Peter was born to a father from Antwerp and was of an affluent background. Peter was baptized on 29 June 1598 in Fowey and was educated at Trinity College, Cambridge which awarded him a Bachelor of Arts degree in 1618. Having experienced conversion, he preached in Essex; returning to London, he took Anglican orders and was appointed lecturer at St Sepulchre's. He entertained, however, Puritan opinions and eventually left England for Holland. He visited Gustavus Adolphus of Sweden in Germany in about 1632 and, afterwards, became the minister of the English church at Rotterdam.

Here, his Puritan leanings again attracted attention, and Peter made a further move to New England. He was connected with John Winthrop through his wife, (Note: Elizabeth, Peter's first wife connected him with the Winthrop family, for Elizabeth's first husband, Edmund Read, was father of a daughter Elizabeth who was the wife of John Winthrop the younger (Firth 1896, p. 69).) and he would be able to renew friendships with American colonists - also Puritans ministers - who had been his contemporaries at Cambridge University, including John Wheelwright and Samuel Whiting Snr. Peter arrived at Boston in October 1635 and was given charge of the church at Salem. He played a significant role during the 1637 trial of Anne Hutchinson during the Antinomian Controversy, being one of the ministers wanting her banished from the colony. He took a leading part in the affairs of the colony, and interested himself in the founding of the new colony in Connecticut. He was also active in the establishment of Harvard College.

== Civil War period ==
In 1641, Peter returned to England as agent of the colony, but soon became involved in the political troubles which now began. He became chaplain to the forces of the adventurers in Ireland, and served in 1642 in Lord Forbes's expedition, of which he wrote an account. On his return he took a violent part in the campaign against William Laud, and defended the doctrines of the Independents in a preface to a tract by Richard Mather entitled "Church Government and Church Covenant discussed ..." (1643).

In September 1643 the Parliamentary Committee of Safety employed Peter on a mission to Holland, there to borrow money on behalf of Parliament, and to explain the justice of its cause to the Dutch.

He was more valuable to the Parliamentary cause as a preacher than as a diplomat, and his sermons were very effective in winning recruits to the parliamentary army. He also became famous as an exhorter at the executions of state criminals, attended Richard Challoner on the scaffold, and improved the opportunity when Sir John Hotham was beheaded. However, it was as an army chaplain that Peter exerted the widest influence. In May 1644 he accompanied the Earl of Warwick in his naval expedition for the relief of Lyme, preached a thanksgiving sermon in the church there after its accomplishment, and was commissioned by Warwick to represent the state of the west and the needs of the forces there to the attention of Parliament. This was the prelude to greater services of the same nature rendered to Sir Thomas Fairfax and the New Model Army. As chaplain, Peter took a prominent part in the campaigns of that army during 1645 and 1646. Whenever a town was to be assaulted, it was his business to preach a preparatory sermon to the storming parties, and at Bridgwater, Bristol, and Dartmouth his eloquence was credited with inspiring the soldiers. After a victory he was equally effective in persuading the populace of the justice of the parliamentary arms, and in converting neutrals into supporters. During the siege of Bristol he made converts of five thousand clubmen, and when Fairfax's army entered Cornwall, his despatches specially mentioned the usefulness of Peter in persuading his countrymen to submission.

In addition to his duties as a chaplain, Peter exercised the functions of a confidential agent of the general and of a war correspondent. Fairfax habitually employed him to represent to Parliament the condition of his army, the motives which determined his movements, and the details of his successes. His relations of battles and sieges were eagerly read, and formed a semi-official supplement to the general's own reports. Oliver Cromwell followed the example of Fairfax, and on his behalf Peter delivered to the House of Commons narratives of the capture of Winchester and the sack of Basing House. It was a fitting tribute to his position and his services that he was selected to preach, on 2 April 1646, the thanksgiving sermon for the recovery of the west before the two houses of parliament.

At the conclusion of the First English Civil War, Peter, though greatly disliked by the Presbyterians and the Scots, had attained great influence as leader of the Independents. In his pamphlet "Last Report of the English Wars" (1646), he urged religious toleration, an alliance with foreign Protestants, and an active propagation of the gospel. In the dispute between the New Model Army and the Long Parliament he naturally took the side of the former, and after the seizure of the King by the Army in June 1647 had interviews with Charles I at Newmarket and Windsor, in which he favourably impressed the latter, and gave advice upon the best course to pursue. He performed useful services in the Second Civil War, procured guns for the besiegers at the siege of Pembroke, raised troops in the Midlands, and arranged the surrender of the Duke of Hamilton at Uttoxeter. When the Army entered London in 1648 he was one of the few preachers who supported the move and spoke out in support of Pride's Purge. In August 1649 he accompanied Cromwell on his Irish Campaign, and was present at the fall of Wexford, while later he assisted the campaign by superintending from England the despatch to Cromwell of supplies and reinforcements, and was himself destined by Cromwell for a regiment of foot. In 1650 he was appointed chaplain to the Council of State. Through his office he exerted influence on various committees concerned with religious, legal and social reforms. The same year, during the Third Civil War he was in South Wales, endeavouring to bring over the people to the cause, and subsequently was present at the Battle of Worcester in 1651, where afterwards he preached to the victorious Parliamentary soldiers.

=== Role in trial and execution of Charles I ===
Peter rode at the head of the force bringing Charles I to London as prisoner, and justified and supported the trial and sentence in sermons. Peter's counsel was important in the inner circle of Cromwell and influenced the highest levels of policy making. According to a witness, Peter had asserted that he was the one who first suggested to Cromwell that the king should be tried and executed. He is believed to have been the headman's assistant.

== Under the Commonwealth ==
At the conclusion of the war, Peter was appointed one of the preachers at Whitehall and became a person of influence. Parliament had already voted him an annuity of £200; Archbishop Laud's library (or a portion of it) had been handed over to him in 1644. He was one of the committee of twenty-one appointed to suggest legal reforms, and he published his ideas on this subject, which included a register of wills and land titles and the destruction afterwards of the ancient records, in his tract, "Good Work for a Good Magistrate" (in 1651), answered by R Vaughan and Prynne. He strongly disapproved of the First Anglo-Dutch War, and his influence suffered. In July 1658 he was sent to Dunkirk as garrison chaplain. He preached the funeral sermon on Oliver Cromwell, and opposed the removal of Richard Cromwell.

In 1647 Peter had called for the readmission of the Jews to England, believing this would benefit the economy and hasten the Second Coming. On account of his views on the admission of the Jews, Cromwell invited him to the Whitehall Conference of 1655 to support his case. At the conference Peter changed sides, expressing the opinion that not only could the Jews could not be converted, but they might do harm through missionary work.

== Restoration and Stuart reprisal ==
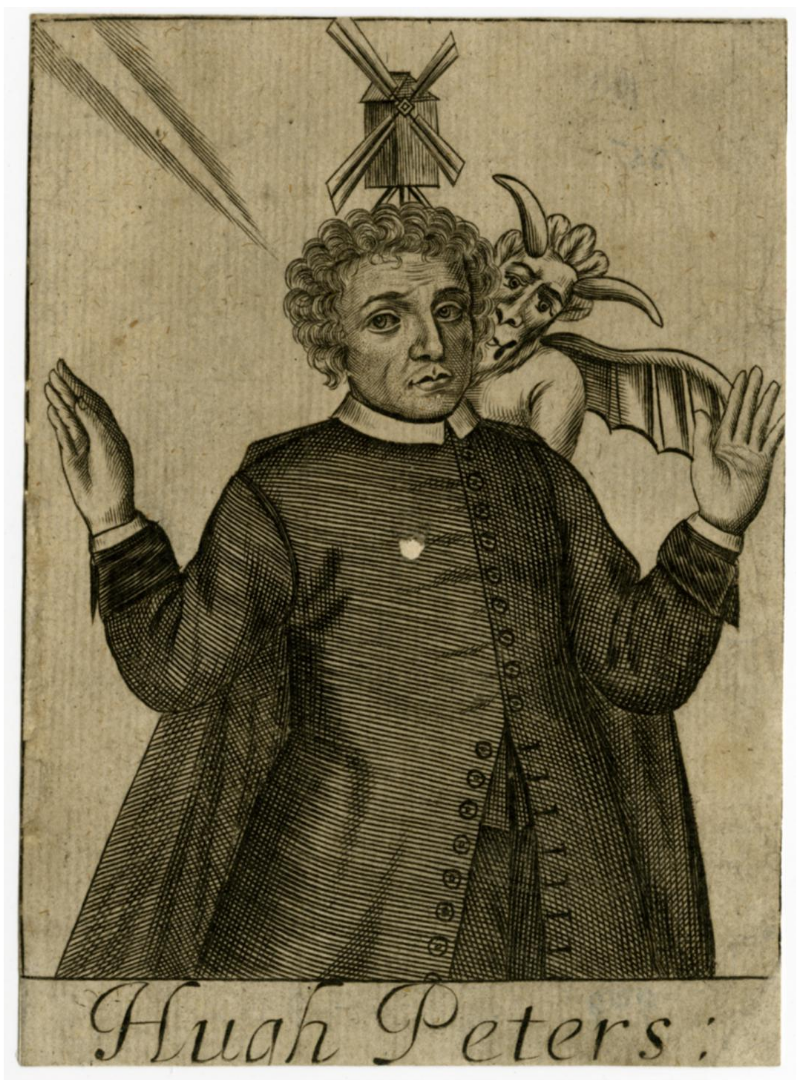
Hugh Peters depicted in a 1660 broadside, "Don Pedro de Quixot, or in English the Right Reverend Hugh Peters"

The country became unstable and factional after Cromwell's son fell from power, and General Monck came from Scotland leading the only effective and unified force left. Peter attempted to secure his position with the new power in the land and met Monck at St Albans on the latter's march to London, but met with no favour, being expelled from his lodgings at Whitehall in January 1660. Monck's restoration of the house of Stuart placed Peter in serious danger. On 11 May his arrest was ordered. On 17 May the Library of the Archbishop of Canterbury was taken from him. (Note: "the Library of the late Archbishop of Canterbury, and now, or lately, in the Hands of Mr. Hugh Peters, be forthwith secured".(House of Commons 1802, pp. 27–33)) He was excepted from the Act of Indemnity and apprehended on September 2 in Southwark.

Peter's preaching and addresses to Parliament on Cromwell's behalf had made him too well known as a Puritan opponent of the royal house of Stuart for any disavowals to save him; thus, a recantation of his opinions and a display of repentance would probably have been his best hope. It would also prevent his property being forfeited and leave something for his heirs. However, he appeared to have panicked, sending a defence of himself to the House of Lords in which he denied any share in the death of Charles I. In addition to justifying Charles being condemned to death, Peter was alleged to be one of the two heavily disguised executioners, even the one who welded the axe, though this was a task requiring some skill. The headsman's assistant had held up the severed head to spectators, and contemptuously thrown it aside afterward, but he omitted the usual pronouncement 'This is the head of a traitor'; as a leading preacher Peter's voice would have been easily recognized. A witness testified that Peter had ordered a carpenter to drive staples into the scaffold (for tying Charles to the block if he resisted), been present at the scene on the day of the execution, disappeared for an hour during it, and was seen drinking water with the presumed headsman, Richard Brandon, afterwards. Peter produced an alibi, claiming that he had been ill and confined to bed at home on that day, which was confirmed by a house servant of his, but the court found that testimony unconvincing. He was tried on 13 October and found guilty of high treason. Peter wrote "A Dying Father's Last Legacy" to his only child, Elizabeth, in which he gave a narrative of his career.

=== Execution ===
He was sentenced to be hanged, drawn and quartered and the execution took place at Charing Cross on 16 October. Peter was forced to watch John Cook suffering emasculation and disembowelment before enduring the same fate himself. Some contemporaries reported him as having been in a poor mental state before his execution, while others, on the contrary, described his demeanour as dignified and composed.

== Bibliography ==
Hugh Peter was the author of the following pamphlets:

1. "The Advice of that Worthy Commander Sir Edward Harwood upon occasion of the French King's Preparations … Also a relation of his life and death" (the relation is by Peter), 4to, 1642; reprinted in the Harleian Miscellany, ed. Park, iv. 268.
2. "A True Relation of the passages of God's Providence in a voyage for Ireland … wherein every day's work is set down faithfully by H. P., an eye-witness thereof", 4to, 1642.
3. "Preface to Richard Mather's Church Government and Church Covenant discussed", 4to, 1643.
4. "Mr. Peter's Report from the Armies, 26 July 1645, with a list of the chiefest officers taken at Bridgewater", &c., 4to, 1645.
5. "Mr. Peter's report from Bristol", 4to, 1645.
6. "The Full and Last Relation of all things concerning Basing House, with divers other Passages represented to Mr. Speaker and divers Members in the House. By Mr. Peters who came from Lieut.-Gen. Cromwell", 4to, 1645.
7. "Master Peter's Message from Sir Thomas Fairfax with the narration of the taking of Dartmouth", 4to, 1646.
8. "Master Peter's Message from Sir Thomas Fairfax … with the whole state of the west and all the particulars about the disbanding of the Prince and Sir Ralph Hopton's Army", 4to, 1646.
9. "God's Doings and Man's Duty", opened in a sermon preached 2 April 1646, 4to.
10. "Mr. Peter's Last Report of the English Wars, occasioned by the importunity of a Friend pressing an Answer to seven Queries", 1646, 4to.
11. "Several Propositions presented to the House of Commons by Mr. Peters concerning the Presbyterian Ministers of this Kingdom, with the discovery of two great Plots against the Parliament of England", 1646, 4to.
12. "A Word for the Army and Two Words for the Kingdom", 1647, 4to; reprinted in the Harleian Miscellany, ed. Park, v. 607.
13. "Good Work for a good Magistrate, or a short cut to great quiet, by honest, homely, plain English hints given from Scripture, reason, and experience for the regulating of most cases in this Commonwealth", by H. P., 12mo, 1651.
14. A preface to The Little Horn's Doom and Downfall, by Mary Cary, 12mo, 1651.
15. "Æternitati sacrum Terrenum quod habuit sub hoc pulvere deposuit Henricus Ireton", Latin verses on Henry Ireton's death, fol. [1650].
16. Dedication to "Operum Gulielmi Amesii volumen primum", Amsterdam, 12mo, 1658.
17. "A Dying Father's Last Legacy to an only Child, or Mr. Hugh Peter's advice to his daughter, written by his own hand during his late imprisonment", 12mo, 1660.
18. "The Case of Mr. Hugh Peters impartially communicated to the view and censure of the whole world, written by his own hand", 4to, 1660.
19. "A Sermon by Hugh Peters preached before his death, as it was taken by a faithful hand, and now published for public information", London, printed by John Best, 4to, 1660.

A number of speeches, confessions, sermons, &c., attributed to Peter, are merely political squibs and satirical attacks. A list of these is given in Bibliotheca Cornubiensis. There are also attributed to Peter:

1. "The Nonesuch Charles his character", 8vo, 1651. This was probably written by Sir Balthazar Gerbier [q. v.], who after the Restoration asserted that Peters was its author.
2. "The Way to the Peace and Settlement of these Nations. … By Peter Cornelius van Zurick-Zee", 4to, 1659; reprinted in Somers Tracts, ed. Scott, vi. 487.
3. "A Way propounded to make the poor in these and other nations happy. By Peter Cornelius van Zurick-Zee", 4to, 1659. A note in the copy of the latter in Thomason's Collection in the British Museum, says: "I believe this pamphlet was made by Mr. Hugh Peters, who hath a man named Cornelius Glover".

== Character assessment ==
In the opinion of the anonymous author of Peter's biography article in the Encyclopædia Britannica 11th ed (1911) his death was viewed with greater rejoicings than perhaps attended that of any of the regicides, as he had incurred great unpopularity by his unrestrained speech and extreme activity in the cause. He is said to have been a man of a rough, coarse nature, without tact or refinement, of strong animal spirits, undeterred by difficulties which beset men of higher mental capacity, whose energies often outran his discretion, intent upon the realities of life and the practical side of religion. In the opinion of that writer, Peter's conception of religious controversy, that all differences could be avoided if ministers could only pray together and live together, is highly characteristic, and shows the largeness of his personal sympathies and at the same time the limits of his intellectual imagination.

In his Dictionary of National Biography article (1896) on Peter, the historian C. H. Firth was of the opinion that his popular hatred was hardly deserved. Peter had earned it by what he said rather than by what he did. His public-spirited exertions for the general good and his kindnesses to individual royalists were forgotten, and only his denunciations of the king and his attacks on the clergy were remembered. Burnet characterises him as "an enthusiastical buffoon preacher, though a very vicious man, who had been of great use to Cromwell, and had been very outrageous in pressing the king's death with the cruelty and rudeness of an inquisitor", His jocularity had given as much offence as his violence, and pamphlets were compiled which related his sayings and attributed to him a number of time-honoured witticisms and practical jokes. His reputation was further assailed in songs and satires charging him with embezzlement, drunkenness, adultery, and other crimes; but these accusations were among the ordinary controversial weapons of the period, and deserve no credit. They rest on no evidence, and were solemnly denied by Peter. In one case the publisher of these libels was obliged to insert a public apology in the newspapers. An examination of the career and the writings of Peter shows him to have been an honest, upright, and genial man, whose defects of taste and judgement explain much of the odium which he incurred, but in the opinion of Firth do not justify it.

Peter is described as having been tall and thin, according to the tradition recorded by one of his successors at Salem, but his portraits represent a full-faced, and apparently rather corpulent man. A picture of him, described by Cole, as showing "rather a well-looking open-countenanced man", was formerly in the President's lodge at Queens' College, Cambridge. One which belonged to the Rev. Dr. Treffry was exhibited in the National Portrait Collection of 1868; the best engraved portrait is that prefixed to "A Dying Father's Last Legacy", 12mo, 1660. A list of others is given in the catalogue of the portraits in the Sutherland Collection in the Bodleian Library, and many satirical prints and caricatures are described in the British Museum Catalogue of Prints and Drawings.

Catholic historian Hugh Ross Williamson maintained in the 1950s that Peter had actually and surreptitiously assisted at Charles I's execution. This allegation has not been broadly accepted.

== Family ==
Peter was the son of Thomas Dyckwoode, alias Peter, descended from a family which had left the Netherlands to escape religious persecution, and of Martha, daughter of John Treffry and Emlyn Tresithny of Place, Fowey, Cornwall.

In about 1625, while Peter was preaching in Essex, he married Elizabeth, widow of Edmund Read of Wickford, and daughter of Thomas Cooke of Pebmarsh in the same county.

Peter married secondly Deliverance Sheffield; she was still alive in 1677 in New England, and was supported by charity. By his second marriage Peter had one daughter, Elizabeth, to whom his "Last Legacy" is addressed. She is said to have married and left descendants in America, but the accuracy of the pedigree is disputed.

== Hugh Peter on screen ==
In the 1970 film Cromwell he was played by Patrick Magee.

He was the subject of a 1981 television play A Last Visitor for Mr. Hugh Peter. It showed him the night before his execution, where he is visited by various figures from his past and the future. He was played by Peter Vaughan, Charles Kay played Charles I, Michael Pennington played John Lilburne, and Julia Chambers played his daughter Elizabeth.

== See also ==
- List of regicides of Charles I
