= List of regicides of Charles I of England =

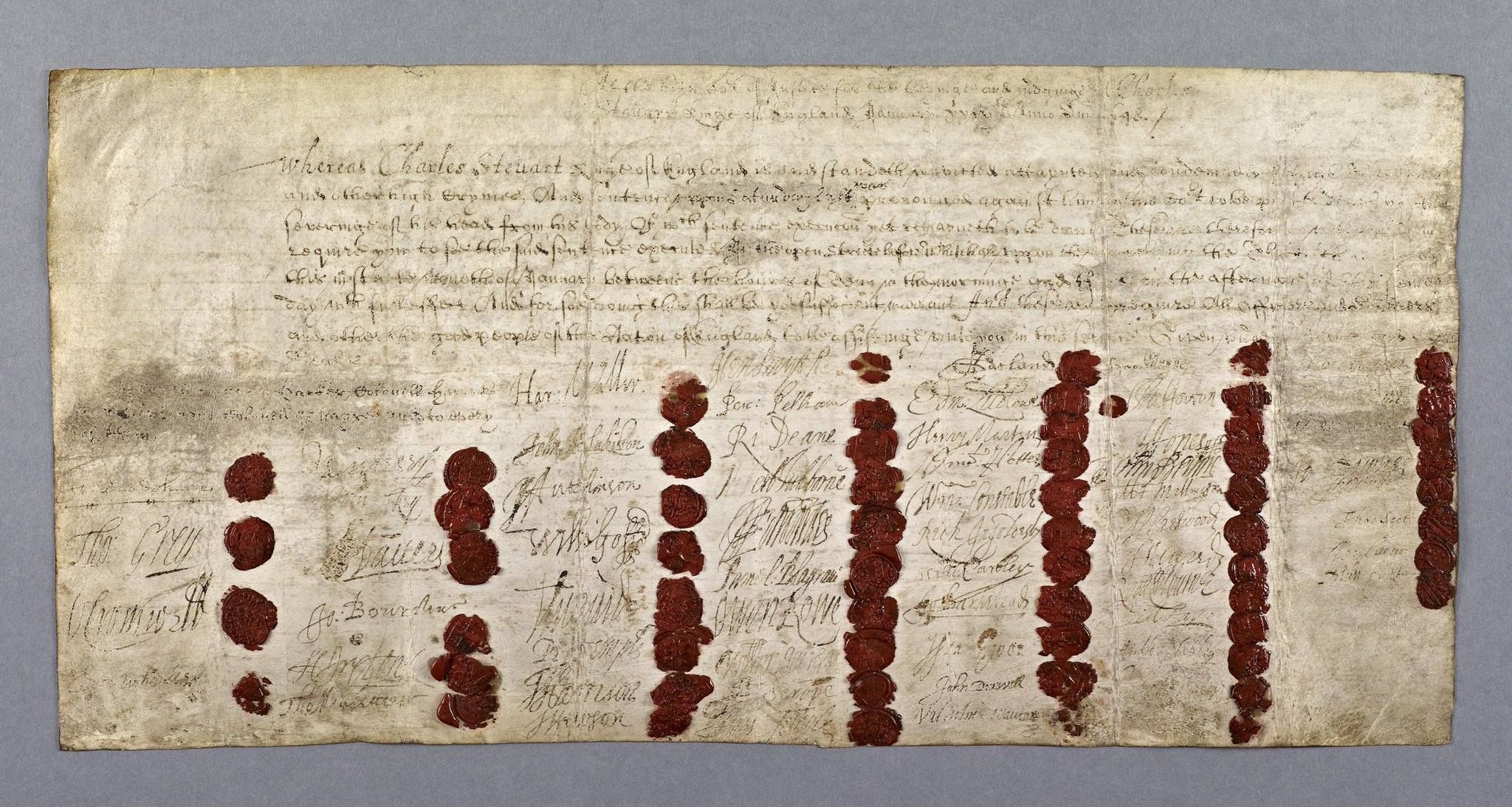
Execution warrant for Charles I of England, including the wax seals of the 59 commissioners (Note: In 2011 the death warrant for Charles I was added by UNESCO to the UK Memory of the World Register (UKP: Warrant; UNESCO: Register))

The Regicides of Charles I were the men responsible for the execution of Charles I on 30 January 1649 — the fifty-nine commissioners who signed the execution warrant. This followed his conviction for treason by the High Court of Justice.

After the 1660 Stuart Restoration, the fifty-nine signatories were among a total of 104 individuals accused of direct involvement in the sentencing and execution. They were excluded from the Indemnity and Oblivion Act, which granted a general amnesty for acts committed during the Wars of the Three Kingdoms and subsequent Interregnum.

Regicide is not a term recognised in English law, and there is no agreed definition, with some historians including all 104 individuals. Twenty of the fifty-nine Commissioners died before the Restoration, including John Bradshaw, who presided over the trial, and Oliver Cromwell, its originator. Eight of the survivors were executed, sixteen died awaiting trial or later in prison, two were pardoned, and the remainder escaped into exile.

== Background ==
Attainder of the Regicides, etc. Act 1660
- Act of Parliament
- Parliament of England
- Long title: An Act for the Attainder of severall persons guilty of the horrid Murther of his late Sacred Majestie King Charles the first.
- Citation: 12 Cha. 2. c. 30
- Territorial extent: England and Wales

Dates
- Royal assent: 29 December 1660
- Commencement: 25 April 1660 (Note: Start of session.)
- Repealed: 1 January 1970
Other legislation
Amended by	Anniversary Days Observance Act 1859
Repealed by	Statute Law (Repeals) Act 1969
Relates to	Confirmation of Acts Act 1661

Status: Repealed

Text of statute as originally enacted

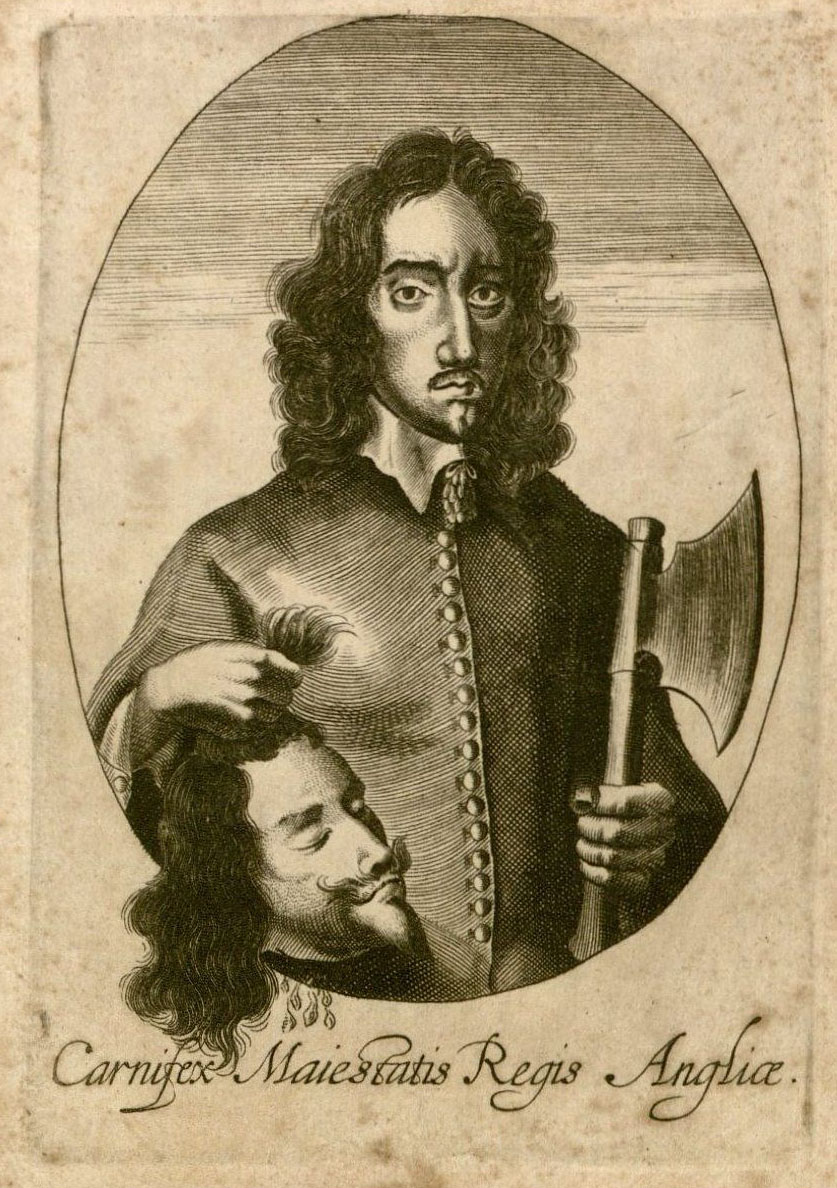
Engraving depicting the executioner holding the severed head of Charles I of England

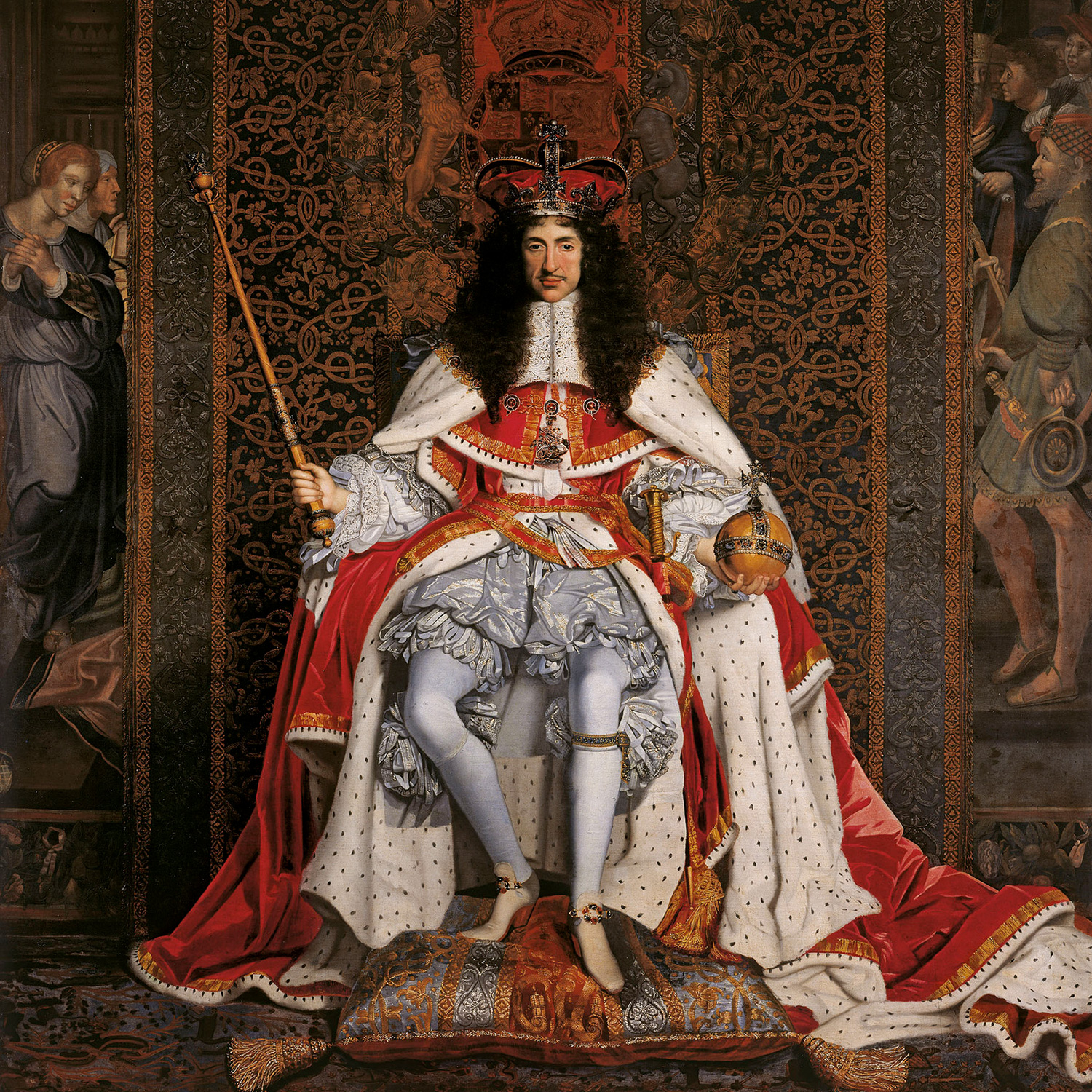
Charles II was crowned at Westminster Abbey on 23 April 1661, following the Restoration of the monarchy.

The 1639 to 1651 Wars of the Three Kingdoms were fought by Royalist supporters of Charles I, and an alliance between his Parliamentarian and Covenanter opponents in England and Scotland respectively. Although Royal authority in political and religious matters were key issues, the war was fought primarily over political power and religious authority. Charles was defeated in the 1642 to 1646 First English Civil War.

In January 1649 a trial court was arranged, composed of 135 commissioners. Some were informed beforehand of their summons, and refused to participate, but most were named without their consent being sought. Forty-seven of those named did not appear either in the preliminary closed sessions or the subsequent public trial. At the end of the four-day trial, 67 commissioners stood to signify that they judged Charles I had "traitorously and maliciously levied war against the present Parliament and the people therein represented". Fifty-seven of the commissioners present signed the death warrant; two further commissioners added their names subsequently. The following day, 30 January, Charles I was beheaded outside the Banqueting House in Whitehall; his son, Charles II, went into exile. The English monarchy was replaced with, at first, the Commonwealth of England (1649–1653) and then the Protectorate (1653–1659) under Cromwell's personal rule.

Following the death of Cromwell in 1658 a power struggle ensued. General George Monck—who had fought for the King until his capture, but had joined Cromwell during the Interregnum—brought an army down from his base in Scotland and restored order; he arranged for elections to be held in early 1660. He began discussions with Charles II who made the Declaration of Breda—on Monck's advice—which offered reconciliation, forgiveness, and moderation in religious and political matters. Parliament sent an invitation to Charles to return, accepting the Restoration of the monarchy as the English political form. Charles arrived in Dover on 25 May 1660 and reached London on 29 May, his 30th birthday.

=== Treatment of the regicides ===
In 1660, Parliament passed the Indemnity and Oblivion Act, (Note: The long title of the Act is "An act of free and generall pardon indemnity and oblivion" (Raithby 1819, p. 226).) which granted amnesty to many of those who had supported the Parliament during the Civil War and the Interregnum, although 104 people were specifically excluded. Of those, 49 named individuals and the two unknown executioners were to face a capital charge. According to Howard Nenner, writing for the Oxford Dictionary of National Biography, Charles would probably have been content with a smaller number to be punished, but Parliament took a strong line.

Of those who were listed to receive punishment, 24 had already died, including Cromwell, John Bradshaw, the judge who was president of the court, and Henry Ireton. They were given a posthumous execution: their remains were exhumed, and they were hanged, beheaded and their remains cast into a pit below the gallows. Their heads were placed on spikes above Westminster Hall, the building where the High Court of Justice for the trial of Charles I had sat. In 1660, six of the commissioners and four others were found guilty of regicide and executed. One was hanged and nine were hanged, drawn and quartered.

On Monday 15 October 1660, Pepys records in his diary that "this morning Mr Carew was hanged and quartered at Charing Cross; but his quarters, by a great favour, are not to be hanged up." Five days later he writes, "I saw the limbs of some of our new traitors set upon Aldersgate, which was a sad sight to see; and a bloody week this and the last have been, there being ten hanged, drawn, and quartered." In 1662, three more regicides were hanged, drawn and quartered. Some others were pardoned, while a further nineteen served life imprisonment. Most had their property confiscated and many were banned from holding office or title again in the future.

Twenty-one of those under threat fled Britain, mostly settling in the Netherlands or Switzerland, although some were captured and returned to England, or murdered by Royalist sympathisers. Three of the regicides, John Dixwell, Edward Whalley and William Goffe, fled to New England, where they avoided capture, despite a search. (Note: The three are commemorated by three intersecting major avenues in New Haven (Dixwell Avenue, Whalley Avenue, and Goffe Street), and by place names in other Connecticut towns (Major 2013, p. 153).)

Nenner records that there is no agreed definition of who is included in the list of regicides. The Indemnity and Oblivion Act did not use the term either as a definition of the act, or as a label for those involved, (Note: Nenner writes that "Regicide was a sin, but it was not a crime. In English law it never had been. The government therefore eschewed the word, abandoning the debate over its use to the arena of popular discourse, where the allegations of regicide were trumpeted from the pulpit and elaborated in the press" (Nenner 2004).) and historians have identified different groups of people as being appropriate for the name.

Shortly after the Restoration in Scotland, the Scottish Parliament passed an Act of Indemnity and Oblivion. It was similar to the English Indemnity and Oblivion Act, but there were many more exceptions under the Scottish act than there were under the English one. Most of the Scottish exceptions were pecuniary, and only four men were executed, all for treason but none for regicide, of whom the Marquess of Argyll was the most prominent. He was found to be guilty of collaboration with Cromwell's government, and beheaded on 27 May 1661.

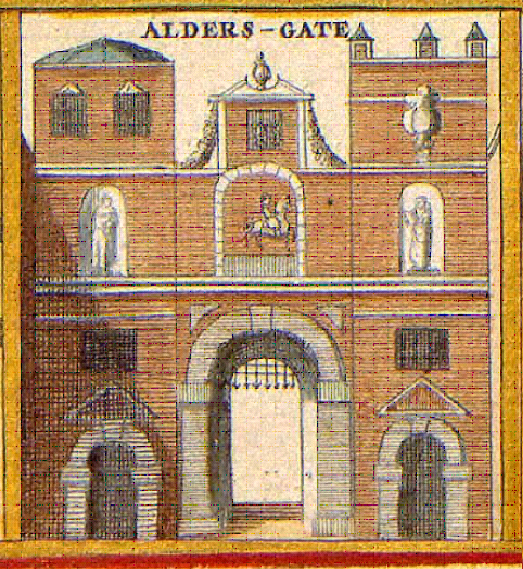
An old illustration of the Aldersgate, c. 1650

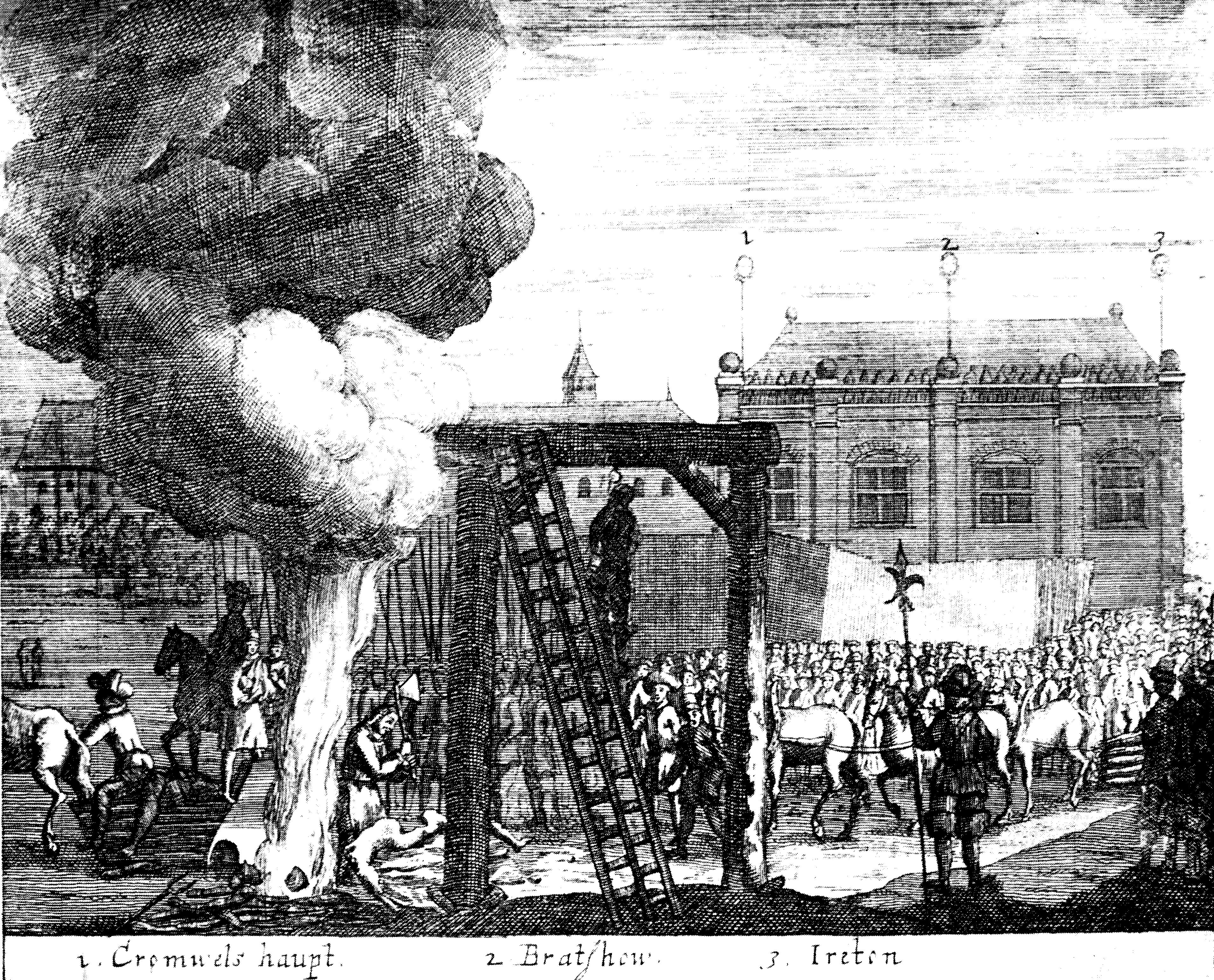
The execution of the bodies of Cromwell, Bradshaw, and Ireton, from a contemporary print

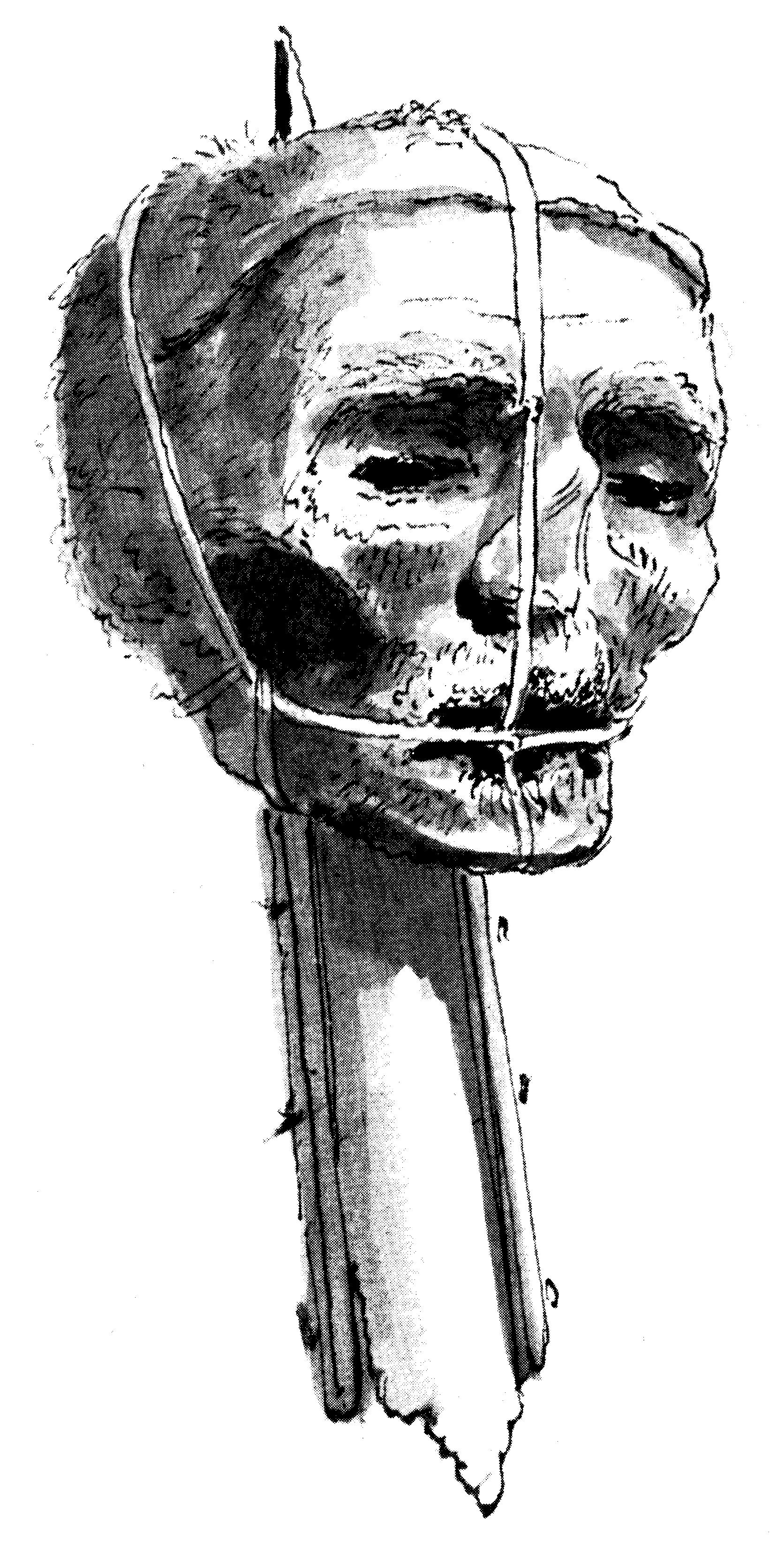
A drawing of Oliver Cromwell's head on a spike

== Regicides ==
=== Commissioners who signed the death warrant ===
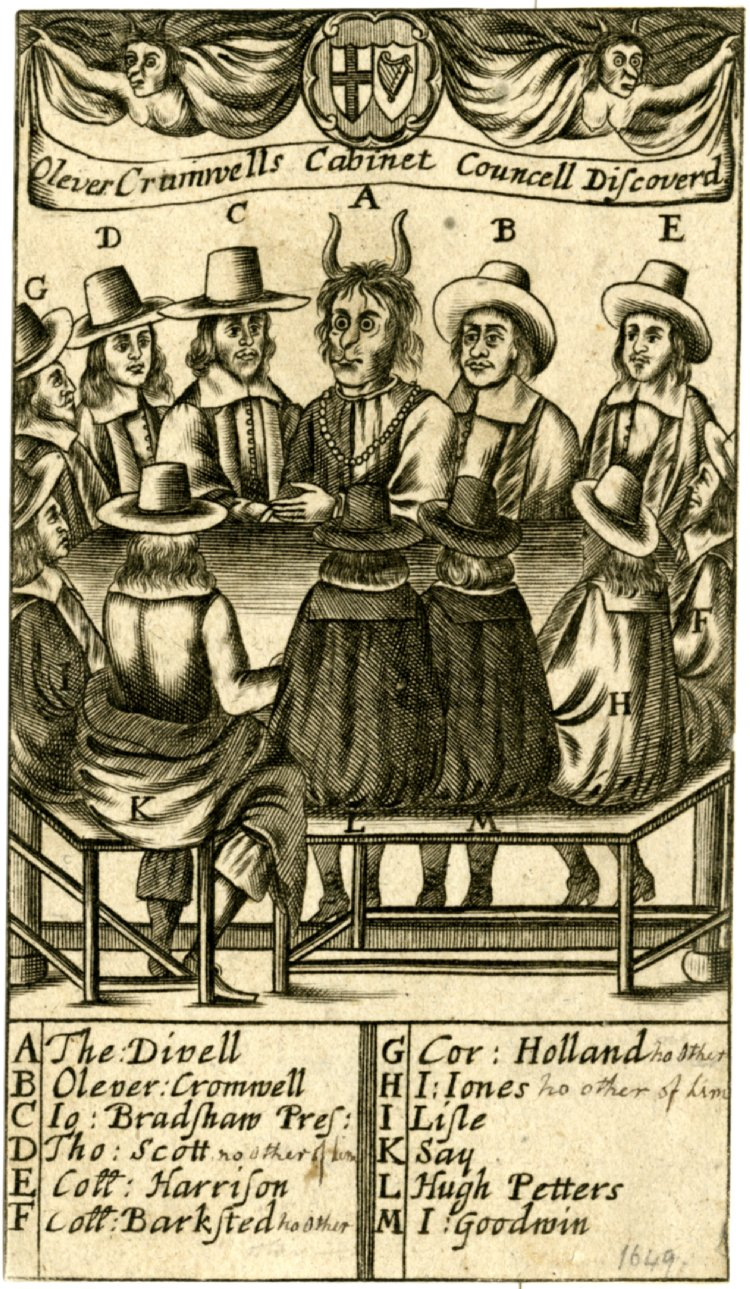
Illustration in a satirical book from the 1660s. The devil sits with eleven men: nine regicides and two chaplains who supported the execution of Charles I. (Oliver Cromwell, John Bradshaw, Thomas Scott, Colonel Thomas Harrison, Colonel John Barkstead, Cornelius Holland, John Jones, John Lisle, William Say, Hugh Peters, John Goodwin).

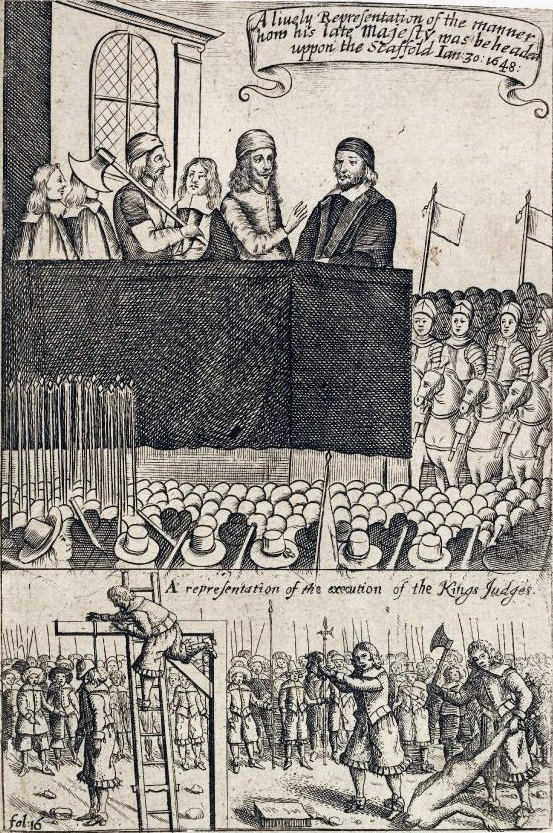
Anonymous illustration comparing the execution of Charles I with that of the regicides

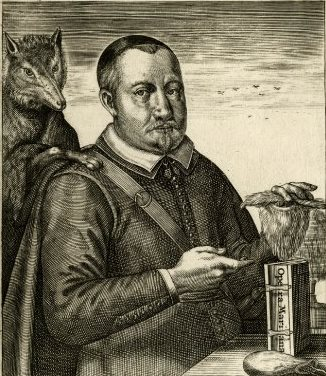
Anonymously printed Dutch pamphlet attacking the beheading of Charles I, showing Oliver Cromwell with a fox at his shoulder

In the order in which they signed the death warrant, the Commissioners were:

Commissioners whose signatures appeared on the death warrant
Order	Name	At the Restoration	Notes	Ref.
1	John Bradshaw, President of the Court	Dead	Died in 1659. Posthumous execution: disinterred, hanged at Tyburn and beheaded. His body was thrown into a pit and the head placed on a spike at the end of Westminster Hall, facing the direction of the spot where Charles I had been executed.	
2	Lord Grey of Groby	Dead	Died in 1657	
3	Oliver Cromwell	Dead	Died in 1658. Posthumous execution: disinterred, hanged at Tyburn and beheaded. His body was thrown into a pit and the head placed on a spike at the end of Westminster Hall, facing the direction of the spot where Charles I had been executed.	
4	Edward Whalley	Alive	Fled to the New Haven Colony with a co-commissioner, his son-in-law William Goffe, to avoid trial. He was alive but in poor health in 1674, where he was sought by the agents of Charles II but shielded by the sympathetic colonists. He probably died in 1675.	
5	Sir Michael Livesey	Alive	Fled to the Netherlands. In June 1665, he was known to be at Rotterdam, and probably died there shortly afterwards.	
6	John Okey	Alive	Fled to Germany, but was arrested by the English Ambassador to the Netherlands, Sir George Downing. He was tried, found guilty and hanged, drawn and quartered in April 1662.	
7	Sir John Danvers	Dead	Died in 1655	
8	Sir John Bourchier	Alive	Too ill to be tried and died in 1660	
9	Henry Ireton	Dead	Died in 1651. Posthumous execution: disinterred, hanged at Tyburn and beheaded. His body was thrown into a pit and the head placed on a spike at the end of Westminster Hall, facing the direction of the spot where Charles I had been executed.	
10	Sir Thomas Mauleverer	Dead	Died in 1655, but was exempted from the Indemnity and Oblivion Act	
11	Sir Hardress Waller	Alive	Fled to France; later returned and was found guilty. Sentenced to death, but the sentence was commuted to life imprisonment. Died 1666 in prison on Jersey.	
12	John Blakiston	Dead	Died in 1649	
13	John Hutchinson	Alive	Pardoned in 1660, but was implicated in the 1663 Farnley Wood Plot; he was imprisoned in Sandown Castle, Kent where he died on 11 September 1664.	
14	William Goffe	Alive	Fled to the New Haven Colony with a co-commissioner, his father-in-law Edward Whalley; escaped from being arrested in 1678. Burke's Peerage reports that William Goffe died in New Haven in 1680.	
15	Thomas Pride	Dead	Died in 1658. Posthumous execution alongside Cromwell, Ireton and Bradshaw was ordered but not carried out	
16	Peter Temple	Alive	Brought to trial, sentenced to death but sentence was commuted to life imprisonment. He died in the Tower of London in 1663	
17	Thomas Harrison	Alive	First to be found guilty. Was hanged, drawn and quartered at Charing Cross on 13 October 1660. He was a leader of the Fifth Monarchists, who still posed a threat to the Restoration.	
18	John Hewson	Alive	Fled to Amsterdam, then possibly Rouen. He died in one of those cities in either 1662 or 1663.	
19	Henry Smith	Alive	Brought to trial, sentenced to death but sentence was commuted to life imprisonment. He was held in the Tower of London until 1664 and was transported to Mont Orgueil castle in Jersey. Died 1668.	
20	Sir Peregrine Pelham	Dead	Died in 1650	
21	Richard Deane	Dead	Died in 1653. Disinterred and thrown into a communal pit.	
22	Sir Robert Tichborne	Alive	Brought to trial, sentenced to death but was reprieved. He spent the rest of his life imprisoned in the Tower of London. Died 1682.	
23	Humphrey Edwards	Dead	Died in 1658	
24	Daniel Blagrave	Alive	Fled to Aachen — now in Germany — where he probably died in 1668	
25	Owen Rowe	Alive	Brought to trial, sentenced to death, but died in the Tower of London in December 1661 while awaiting execution.	
26	William Purefoy	Dead	Died in 1659	
27	Adrian Scrope	Alive	Tried, found guilty: hanged, drawn and quartered at Charing Cross on 17 October 1660	
28	James Temple	Alive	Brought to trial, sentenced to life imprisonment on Jersey; he is reported to have died there on 17 February 1680.	
29	Augustine Garland	Alive	Brought to trial, his death sentence was commuted to life imprisonment. He died in or after 1677.	
30	Edmund Ludlow	Alive	Surrendered to the Speaker of the House of Commons, and then escaped to Vevey in the Canton of Bern. Died 1692.	
31	Henry Marten	Alive	Tried and found guilty. He was sentenced to life imprisonment and died in Chepstow Castle in 1680.	
32	Vincent Potter	Alive	Brought to trial, he received the death sentence but it was not carried out; he died in the Tower of London, probably in 1661.	
33	Sir William Constable, 1st Baronet	Dead	Died in 1655. Disinterred and thrown into a communal pit.	
34	Sir Richard Ingoldsby	Alive	Assisted General Monck during Restoration. Pardoned. Died 1685.	
35	William Cawley	Alive	Escaped to Switzerland, where he died in 1667	
36	John Barkstead	Alive	Arrested by the English ambassador to the Netherlands, Sir George Downing, extradited and executed in 1662	
37	Isaac Ewer	Dead	Died in 1650 or 1651	
38	John Dixwell	Alive	Believed dead in England, he fled to the New Haven Colony, where he died in 1689 under an assumed name.	
39	Valentine Walton	Alive	Escaped to Germany after being condemned as a regicide. Died in 1661.	
40	Simon Mayne	Alive	Tried and sentenced to death, he died in the Tower of London in 1661 before his appeal could be heard.	
41	Thomas Horton	Dead	Died in 1649	
42	John Jones Maesygarnedd	Alive	Tried, found guilty: hanged, drawn and quartered at Charing Cross on 17 October 1660	
43	John Moore	Dead	Died in 1650	
44	Gilbert Millington	Alive	Tried and sentenced to death, but sentence commuted to life imprisonment. Millington spent his final years in Jersey and died in 1666.	
45	George Fleetwood	Alive	Brought to trial and sentenced to imprisonment in the Tower of London. He may have been transported to Tangier. Died c. 1672.	
46	John Alured	Dead	Died in 1651	
47	Robert Lilburne	Alive	Tried in October 1660 and sentenced to death, although this was later commuted to life imprisonment. Died in prison in August 1665.	
48	William Say	Alive	Escaped to Switzerland. Died 1666.	
49	Anthony Stapley	Dead	Died in 1655	
50	Sir Gregory Norton, 1st Baronet	Dead	Died in 1652	
51	Thomas Chaloner	Alive	Escaped, and died at Middelburg in the Netherlands in 1661.	
52	Thomas Wogan	Alive	Held at York Castle until 1664 when he escaped to the Netherlands; still alive in 1666	
53	John Venn	Dead	Died in 1650	
54	Gregory Clement	Alive	Went into hiding, he was captured, tried and found guilty. He was hanged, drawn and quartered at Charing Cross on 17 October 1660.	
55	John Downes	Alive	Tried, found guilty and sentenced to life imprisonment. Died 1666.	
56	Thomas Waite	Alive	Tried, found guilty of regicide, and sentenced to life imprisonment. Died 1688 Jersey	
57	Thomas Scot	Alive	Fled to Brussels, returned to England, was tried, found guilty; and hanged, drawn and quartered at Charing Cross on 17 October 1660. Died unrepentant.	
58	John Carew	Alive	Joined Fifth Monarchists. Tried, found guilty; and hanged, drawn and quartered at Charing Cross on 15 October 1660.	
59	Miles Corbet	Alive	Fled to the Netherlands; arrested by the English ambassador to the Netherlands Sir George Downing; extradited; tried; found guilty; and was hanged, drawn and quartered on 19 April 1662.	

=== Commissioners who did not sign ===
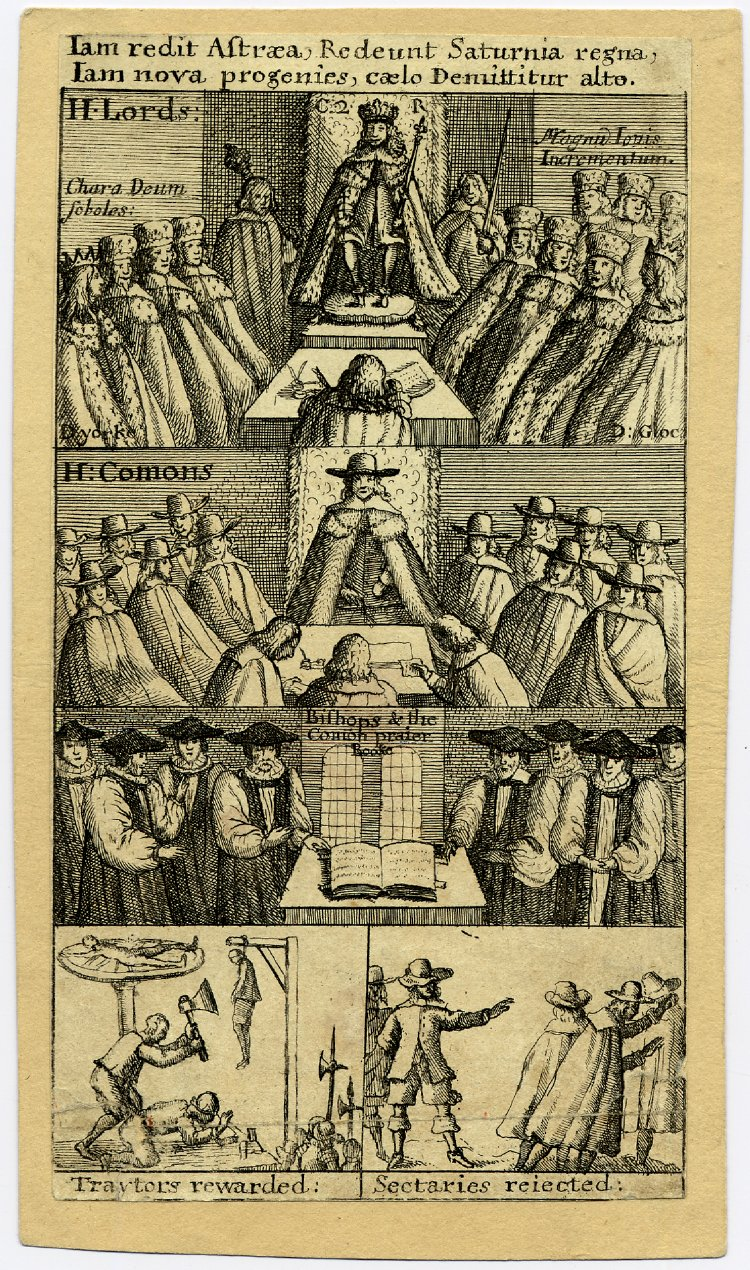
Frontispiece to Giles Duncombe's Scutum Regale, 1660, showing scenes representing the Restoration of the English monarchy

The following Commissioners sat on one or more days at the trial but did not sign the death warrant:

The commissioners who did not sign
Name	At the Restoration	Notes	Ref.
Francis Allen	Dead	Attended several sessions including 27 January when the sentence was agreed upon. His name was one of 24 dead regicides who were excluded from the Indemnity and Oblivion Act 1660 (section XXXVII of the act).	
Sir Thomas Andrewes (or Andrews)	Dead	Attended three sessions, including 27 January when the sentence was agreed upon. His name was one of 24 dead regicides who were excluded from the Indemnity and Oblivion Act 1660 (section XXXVII of the act).	
Thomas Hammond	Dead	Attended 14 sessions. He was excluded from the Indemnity and Oblivion Act, allowing the state to confiscate the property that had belonged to him (section XXXVII of the act).	
Sir James Harington, 3rd Baronet	Alive	Escaped and died in exile on the European mainland in 1680.	
Edmund Harvey	Alive	He was tried in October 1660, and sentenced to life imprisonment. He died in Pendennis Castle, Cornwall, in June 1673.	
William Heveningham	Alive	Found guilty of treason but successfully petitioned for mercy and was thereafter imprisoned in Windsor Castle until his death in 1678	
Cornelius Holland	Alive	He fled to the Netherlands, then on to Lausanne and Vevey where he died, probably in 1671.	
Sir John Lisle	Alive	Escaped to Lausanne, Switzerland but was shot or stabbed by the Irish Royalist James Fitz Edmond Cotter (using the alias Thomas Macdonnell) in August 1664.	
Nicholas Love	Alive	Escaped to Hamburg. Died in Vevey, Switzerland in 1682.	
Isaac Penington	Alive	Sentenced to life imprisonment and died in the Tower of London in 1661	
James Chaloner (or Challoner)	Alive	Brother of Thomas Chaloner. He died in July 1660 from an illness caught after being imprisoned the previous year for supporting General Monck.	
John Dove	Alive	He took no part in the trial other than being present when the sentence was agreed. At the Restoration he was contrite and, after making an abject submission to Parliament, he was allowed to depart unpunished. Died 1664 or 1665.	
John Fry	Dead	He was debarred from sitting on the High Court for heterodoxy on 26 January 1649, one day before the sentence was pronounced. His name was one of 24 dead regicides who were excluded from the Indemnity and Oblivion Act in 1660. Died 1657.	
Sir Henry Mildmay	Alive	Tried, stripped of his knighthood and sentenced to life imprisonment. He died either at Antwerp in 1664/65 whilst being exiled to Tangier, or at Tangier in 1668.	
William Mounson, 1st Viscount Monson	Alive	Tried, stripped of his titles and property and imprisoned for life in the Fleet Prison where he died in 1673.	
Sir Gilbert Pickering, 1st Baronet	Alive	He only attended two sittings at the trial and he did not sign Charles's death warrant, so he was able to use the influence of his brother-in-law Earl of Sandwich, to secure his pardon, although he was banned for life from holding any office.	
Robert Wallop	Alive	Sentenced to life imprisonment and died in the Tower of London in 1667	

=== Other regicides ===
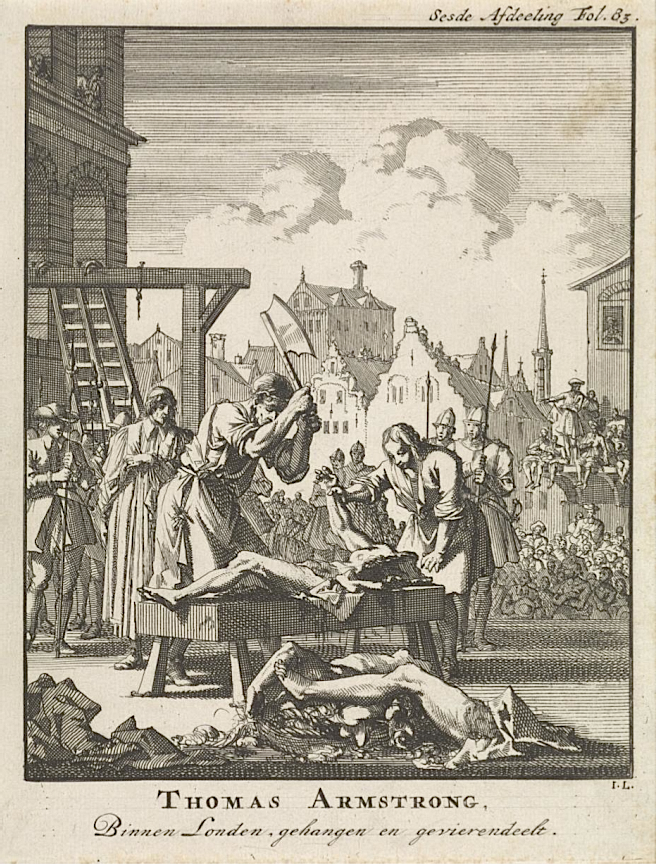
A 1698 etching showing the fate for those convicted of High Treason. The executed were hanged, drawn and quartered, as was the case for Rye House Plotter Thomas Armstrong in 1664.

Name	Office	At the Restoration	Notes	Ref.
Daniel Axtell	Officer of the Guard	Alive	Tried, found guilty of participating in the regicide; hanged, drawn and quartered at Tyburn in October 1660.	
Andrew Broughton	Clerk of the Court	Alive	Escaped to Switzerland in 1663. Died 1687.	
John Cook	Solicitor-General	Alive	Tried, found guilty of regicide; hanged, drawn and quartered at Charing Cross in October 1660	
Edward Dendy	Serjeant-at-arms	Alive	Escaped to Switzerland in 1663; died 1674	
Dr Isaac Dorislaus	Assistant to the Solicitor-General	Dead	A distinguished scholar from the Netherlands, he was murdered in the Hague in 1649 by Royalist refugees.	
Francis Hacker	Officer of the Guard	Alive	Tried, found guilty of signing the execution order; hanged at Tyburn in October 1660	
William Hewlet	Captain in the Guard	Alive	Found guilty of regicide at the same trial as Daniel Axtell, but not executed with him.	
Cornelius Holland	Member of Council of State	Alive	Escaped to Lausanne, Switzerland at Restoration. Died in 1671.	
Hercules Huncks	Officer of the Guard	Alive	Refused to sign the order to the executioners, which Francis Hacker did in his place. He testified against Daniel Axtell and Hacker, and was pardoned. Died in 1676.	
Robert Phayre	Officer of the Guard	Alive	Refused to sign the order to the executioners. He was arrested but not tried; released in 1662. Died in 1682.	
John Phelps	Clerk of the Court	Alive	Escaped to Switzerland. Died in 1666.	
Matthew Thomlinson	Officer of the Guard	Alive	Was appointed a commissioner but never sat in the court. He was pardoned for showing courtesy to the King and for testifying against Daniel Axtell and Francis Hacker. Died in 1681.	
Hugh Peter		Alive	A radical preacher, he was tried and found guilty of inciting regicide; hanged, drawn and quartered at Charing Cross in October 1660.	
Anonymous	Headsman and assistant	Unknown	Article XXXIV of the Act of Pardon and Oblivion listed by name 49 of the men mentioned here and also two others who were unnamed and identified as "those two persons, ... who being disguised by frocks and vizors, did appear upon the scaffold erected before Whitehall". This was the headsman and his assistant, who have never been identified. William Hewlet was found guilty of being one or other of the men on the scaffold, but seems to have been reprieved by the judges on the grounds that the evidence was flimsy. Further information: Executioner of Charles I	

== Others excluded from the general pardon and found guilty of treason ==
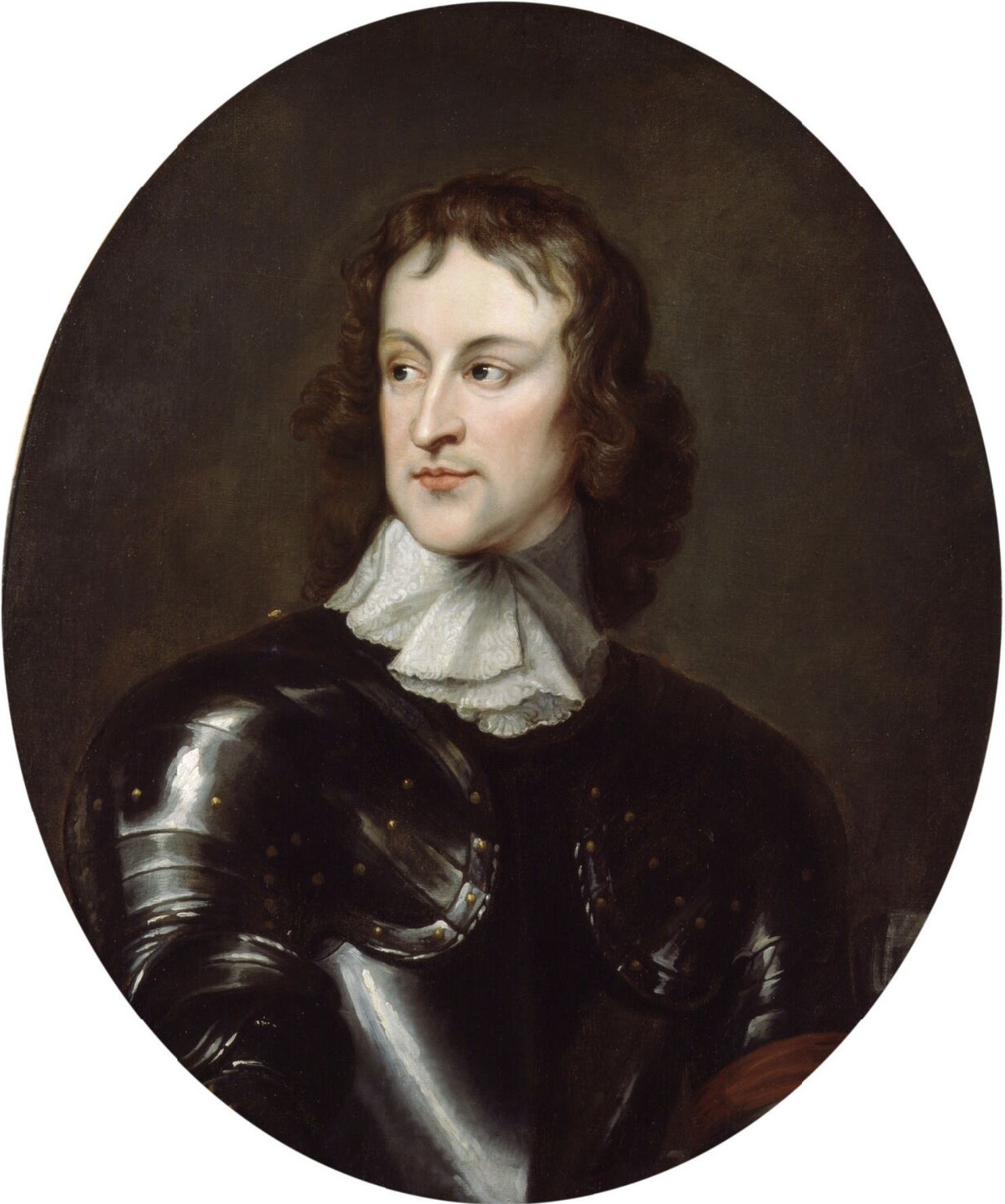
John Lambert

Name	At the Restoration	Notes	Ref.
John Lambert	Alive	Lambert was not in London for the trial of Charles I. At the Restoration, he was found guilty of high treason and remained in custody for the rest of his life, first in Guernsey and then on Drake's Island, where he died in 1683/84.	
Sir Henry Vane the Younger	Alive	After much debate in Parliament, he was excluded from the Indemnity and Oblivion Act. He was tried for high treason, found guilty and beheaded on Tower Hill in June 1662.	

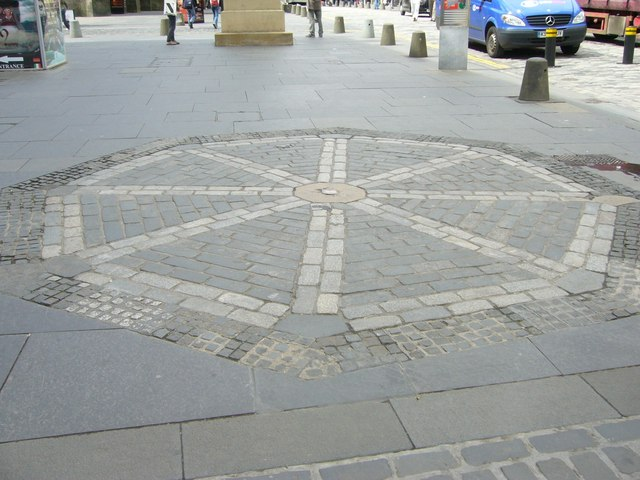
The executions in Scotland took place at the Mercat Cross in Edinburgh, now marked by these pavement setts.

Under the Scottish Act of indemnity and oblivion (9 September 1662), as with the English act most were pardoned and their crimes forgotten, however, a few members of the previous regime were tried and found guilty of treason (for more details see General pardon and exceptions in Scotland):

Actions under the Scottish Act of indemnity and oblivion
Name	Fate	Notes
Archibald Campbell, Marquess of Argyll	Beheaded 27 May 1661.	At his trial in Edinburgh Argyll was acquitted of complicity in the death of Charles I, and his escape from the whole charge seemed imminent, but the arrival of a packet of letters written by Argyll to Monck showed conclusively his collaboration with Cromwell's government, particularly in the suppression of Glencairn's Royalist rising in 1652. He was immediately sentenced to death.
James Guthrie	Hanged 1 June 1661.	On 20 February 1661 Guthrie was arraigned for high treason before the parliament, with Earl of Middleton presiding as commissioner. The indictment had six counts; the contriving of the "Western Remonstrance" and the rejection of the king's ecclesiastical authority were, from a legal point of view, the most formidable charges. The trial was not concluded until 11 April. On 28 May parliament, having found him guilty of treason, ordered him to be hanged.
Captain William Govan	Hanged 1 June 1661 (after Guthrie).	
Archibald Johnston, Lord Warriston	hanged 22 July 1663	At the Restoration Warriston fled to Holland and thence to Hamburg in Germany. He was condemned to death (and stripped of his properties and title) in absentia on 15 May 1661. In 1663, having ventured into France, he was discovered at Rouen, and with the consent of Louis XIV was brought to England and imprisoned in the Tower of London. In June he was taken to Edinburgh and confined in the Tolbooth, and was hanged on 22 July 1663.
John Swinton (1621?–1679)	Imprisoned	Swinton was condemned to forfeiture and imprisonment in Edinburgh Castle, where he remained for some years before being released.
John Home of Kelloe	Estates sequestrated	In 1661, Home had his estates sequestrated for being with the English Parliamentary army against King Charles II's army at the Battle of Worcester in 1651. After the Glorious Revolution of 1688 the estates were restored to his son George.
