= Vincent Potter =

Vincent Potter (c.1614–1661) was an army officer in Parliament's army during the English Civil War and was one of the Regicides of King Charles I of England.

== Early life and career ==
Potter was born in Warwickshire. In 1635 as a member of the Massachusetts Bay Company he sailed to Boston, Massachusetts, where he was employed as a soldier at Castle Island Fort. He spent four years in North America before returning to England and may have fought in the Pequot War.

A strict Puritan, he traded with New England until he joined the parliamentarian army. In January 1643 he was commissioned as an officer of horse by Robert Greville, 2nd Baron Brooke. After Greville's death he continued to fight as a cavalry officer for Parliament until 1645 when he took over as parliamentary commissioner to the army from his brother Captain John Potter.

== Devotion ==
Potter was a diligent commissioner. He drew up lists of former soldiers ("Potter's lists") to help him settle army pay arrears, and became the foremost administrator in this area. He continued to perform as a commissioner during the Second Civil War.

== Controversy ==
Potter was one of the 59 Commissioners who sat in judgment at the trial of Charles I. He attended the trial every day in Westminster Hall, and attended in the Painted Chamber on all days but five- January 8, 12, 13, 18, and 20. He was present on 27 January 1649 when sentence was pronounced against Charles, and he signed and sealed the death-warrant, which commanded Charles to execution.

On 6 March the same year, he also signed the death warrants of five prominent Royalist peers who had been captured during the Second Civil War, the Duke of Hamilton, the Earl of Holland, Lord Capel, the Earl of Holland, and the Earl of Norwich.

== Career under Cromwell ==
In June Potter was made a full colonel and helped to plan and organise the logistics of Cromwell's Irish campaign. He performed a similar service for Cromwell during his Scottish campaign in 1651. He remained in Scotland with a mandate to improve lands in Scotland occupied by the English Army. In 1652 he was posted to Ireland to assist the parliamentarian regime.

One account states that in 1660 at the restoration of the monarchy Potter surrendered himself in obedience to the proclamation, and was one of those excepted both as to life and estate in the Indemnity and Oblivion Act, but judgment was not to follow, for the pains and penalties were to be such as would be expressed in a future act of parliament. However, Robert Howcott, who arrested John Downes, who was another of the regicides, stated in a petition to King Charles II that he has also discovered and apprehended Vincent Potter and taken him to the Lord Mayor (presumably of London) who sent him to the "Serjant at armes".

== Trial and death ==
He was arraigned at the Sessions House in the Old Bailey, October 16, 1660, and pleaded not guilty. His trial commenced on the 16 November, at which he asked for a delay as he pleaded he was ill and in great pain (probably from kidney stones). However the trial went ahead and he was found guilty of high treason and condemned to death for his part in the regicide of Charles I, but he died in the Tower of London in late 1661 or early 1662 before the sentence could be carried out.
