= William Hewlet =

William Hewlet, (also Hewlett, Hulet, Howlet, or Howlett; fl. 1630s–1660) was an English soldier in the New Model Army who was convicted at the 1660 trial of the regicides of Charles I but later reprieved.

== Before the trial ==
Hewlet was a sergeant from the late 1630s. In the English Civil War between Royalists and Parliamentarians, Hewlet served in the Parliamentarians' New Model Army. The war climaxed on 30 January 1649 with the execution of Charles I by beheading in front of Whitehall Palace. Although Hewlet's unit, commanded by Colonel John Hewson, was guarding the scene, Hewlet was not seen to be present among the guards that day. In 1650 Hewlet, promoted to captain-lieutenant of horse, served under Hewson in the Cromwellian conquest of Ireland. He remained in Ireland under Henry Prittie, governor of Carlow. By 1660 he owned some land in Ireland.

== Trial ==
=== Background ===
The Interregnum that followed Charles' execution ended in May 1660 when Royalists and Parliamentarians negotiated the Restoration of the monarchy under the dead king's son, Charles II. A condition was that the new Parliament introduce an Indemnity and Oblivion Bill giving amnesty for most actions of the war and interregnum; among the exceptions would be specific individuals considered most connected to the regicide of Charles I, including those members of the trial commission who had signed the king's death warrant, and some of those present at his beheading.

The axeman and his assistant on the scaffold at Whitehall were listed among those excepted, although their identities were not known as they had been disguised in masks and wigs. Colonel Hewson had been given the task of finding an executioner and assistant, and offered about 40 of his soldiers £100 and quick promotion to volunteer, though none came forward immediately.

Preparatory to the Indemnity and Oblivion Bill, inquiries were held into potential excepted individuals, and John Bysse, the Recorder of Dublin, identified Hewlet as one now stationed in Ireland. William Prynne ordered Hewlet's arrest, and he was committed to the Tower of London on 13 June. The House of Commons added Hewlet's name to the list of excepted individuals on 18 June 1660, and the bill was enacted on 29 August.

=== Proceedings ===
A series of criminal trials for high treason began before a panel of judges at the Old Bailey on 9 October 1660 for 26 of the excepted individuals.

On 15 October, during the trial of Daniel Axtell, Lt.-Col. John Nelson alleged that Axtell had in 1654 or 1655 told him that Hewlet was one of the executioners. Axtell denied saying this and knowing Hewlet or the executioners' identities, but he was convicted.

Hewlet's trial immediately followed Axtell's. The bill of indictment had been mislaid and was found at Hicks Hall on 12 October. It charged:

that William Hewlett, alias Howlett, of the parish of St. Martin-in-the-Fields, in the county of Middlesex, as a false traitor against his late Majesty Charles I., conspiring not only to deprive the said King of his Crown and Dignity, but also to bring him to death and final destruction, did repair on 30 January, 24 Charles 1, to the palace of Whitehall, in the parish of St. Martin-in-the Fields, with a visor upon his face, and clad in a frock, for the purpose of murdering the said King.

He refused pen and ink, saying he could "write but very little" and did not understand the indictment.

Walsh and Jordan call the prosecution case "guesswork, hearsay, and circumstantial evidence". One witness for the prosecution said he recognised the axeman's voice — possibly the earliest legal case involving voice identification — and that an officer had predicted Hewlet's promotion. Three witnesses said Hewlet in later years had told him he was the axeman; he admitted knowing them but denied their accounts. Two witnesses reported accusations by others against Hewlet. The final witness for the prosecution said Hewlet was about the stature of the axeman, and "his beard was of the same colour, if he had any". Several witnesses' first- or second-hand accounts of the execution differed from those given by most eyewitnesses.

Hewlet's alibi was that he was among "seven or nine serjeants" imprisoned at Whitehall Palace on the day of execution for having refused Hewson's demand to serve on the scaffold. Geoffrey Robertson says this seems to conflict with his promotion soon after. Four witnesses said the common hangman of London (Richard Brandon) had confessed to being the axeman, and one witness said Brandon had denied this. Hewlet complained that he had unable to summon further witnesses because he had been in the Tower; his request for a two-week adjournment was refused.

The jury took an unusually long time to find Hewlet guilty. At sentencing the following day, he again said that he would have secured corroborating witnesses if he had had more time to prepare his defence; Matthew Hale, the Lord Chief Baron, before passing the mandatory death sentence, stated that there might be time before the sentence was carried out for such evidence to be considered.

Of the 26 tried, 24 were found guilty, of whom ten were hanged, drawn and quartered, including Axtell at Tyburn on 19 October. The remaining 14, including Hewlet, were committed to Newgate Prison, where their fate was uncertain.

== After the trial ==
There is no record of Hewlet's sentence being executed, or of a royal pardon or commutation being granted. Most later sources say that the judges subsequently reprieved Hewlet on the basis that the evidence at his trial had been insufficient.

On 29 December 1660 the House of Commons received two letters from Hewlet, who was then still in Newgate. There is no definitive later record of him.

Hewlet's lands in Ireland were confiscated in 1661 and awarded to John King, 1st Baron Kingston. In 1663, a Captain William Hewlet was suspected of involvement in Thomas Blood's conspiracy to capture Dublin Castle. James Butler, 1st Duke of Ormond, the Lord Lieutenant of Ireland, wrote that this Hewlet was the alleged regicide, and Robert Hutchinson concurs, but a 1913 review in Notes and Queries says he was probably a cousin. The same person was found to have forged documents in 1667.

When Thomas Tenison was rector of St. Martin-in-the-Fields in the 1680s, he was told that a man who had just died there had claimed to have been the king's executioner. Hugh Ross Williamson suggests the man may have been Hewlet, though Tenison believed he had been "a Butcher or Cattle Driver" from St. Ives, Huntingdonshire.

In 1863 James Payn wrote in Chambers's Journal:

The probability is, that among his republican friends, and while the Cromwellian dynasty lasted, Hulet took no pains to clear himself of the charge in question, but rather, by affecting a certain coyness, acknowledged the soft impeachment; just as one would not mind, under a liberal administration, having the Letters of Junius imputed to one; while, in the event of the establishment of a despotic monarchy, such a reputation would be dangerous.

An 1891 review of Payn's account states that Hewlet "was convicted on such evidence as ... would nowadays certainly have proved his innocence and not his guilt". Geoffrey Robertson suggests the most likely scenario is that Richard Brandon was the headsman and Hewlet his assistant.

== Sources ==
- Edwards, Graham (1999), The Last Days of Charles I, Sutton: Sutton Publishing Ltd, ISBN 978-0-7509-2679-9 – via Open Library
- Howell, Thomas Bayly (1816). "The Trials of Twenty-Nine Regicides, at the Old Bailey, for High Treason, which began on the 9th of October, A. D. 1660". A Complete Collection of State Trials and Proceedings for High Treason and Other Crimes and Misdemeanors from the Earliest Period to the Year 1783. Vol. V. T. C. Hansard for Longman, Hurst, Rees, Orme, and Brown.
- Journal of the House of Commons. Vol. 8: 25 April 1660 – 29 July 1667. 1660.
- Robertson, Geoffrey (2005), The Tyrannicide Brief: The Story of the Man who sent Charles I to the Scaffold, London: Chatto & Windus, ISBN 978-1-4000-4451-1 – via Open Library
- Sidney, Philip (1905), The Headsman of Whitehall, Edinburgh: Geo. A. Morton
- Walsh, Michael; Jordan, Don (28 August 2012). The King's Revenge: Charles II and the Greatest Manhunt in British History. Little, Brown. ISBN 978-0-7481-2654-5.
- Ross Williamson, Hugh (1974). "The Executioner of King Charles I; 30 January 1649". Historical enigmas : comprising Historical whodunits and Enigmas of history. New York: St. Martin's Press. pp. 193–210 – via Open Library.
