= John Fry (regicide) =

Regicide of King Charles I of England

John Fry (1609–1657) was a Member of the English Parliament and sat as a Commissioner (Judge) during the trial of King Charles I of England.

== Biography ==
John Fry, son of William Fry of Iwerne Minster, was born in 1609. He was Member of Parliament for Shaftesbury in the Long and Rump Parliaments, sat through most of the trial of King Charles I, but did not take part in the sentencing, having been suspended from membership of the House of Commons and debarred from sitting on the High Court for heterodoxy on 26 January 1649, one day before the sentence was pronounced. The suspicion raised by Colonel Downes was that Fry did not believe in the doctrine of the Trinity. Eight days later Fry declared in a written statement that he respected the Trinity and was readmitted to the House. Shortly afterwards Fry published a pamphlet against Downes, The Accuser Shamed, in which he expressed opinions far from orthodox. In 1650 Dr Cheynel of Oxford published a retort, to which Fry responded with another pamphlet, The Clergy in their Colours. On 22 February 1651 Parliament decided to burn the two books and expelled their author. John Fry died in 1657. At the restoration in 1660 he was excluded from the Indemnity and Oblivion Act.

Dario Pfanner in the Oxford Dictionary of National Biography states:

Fry was feared by his presbyterian enemies for his criticism of the religious settlement subsequent to the Westminster confession of faith (1647), and was branded as a Socinian because of his anti-Trinitarianism and his emphasis on rational biblicism and tolerance. Yet he was rather Sabellian in his christology, as he did not deny the divinity of Christ and the Holy Ghost but was convinced that the three entities were three different ways of being of the same God.

— Dario Pfanner ODNB
