= Richard Brandon =

Common executioner of London (1639–1649)

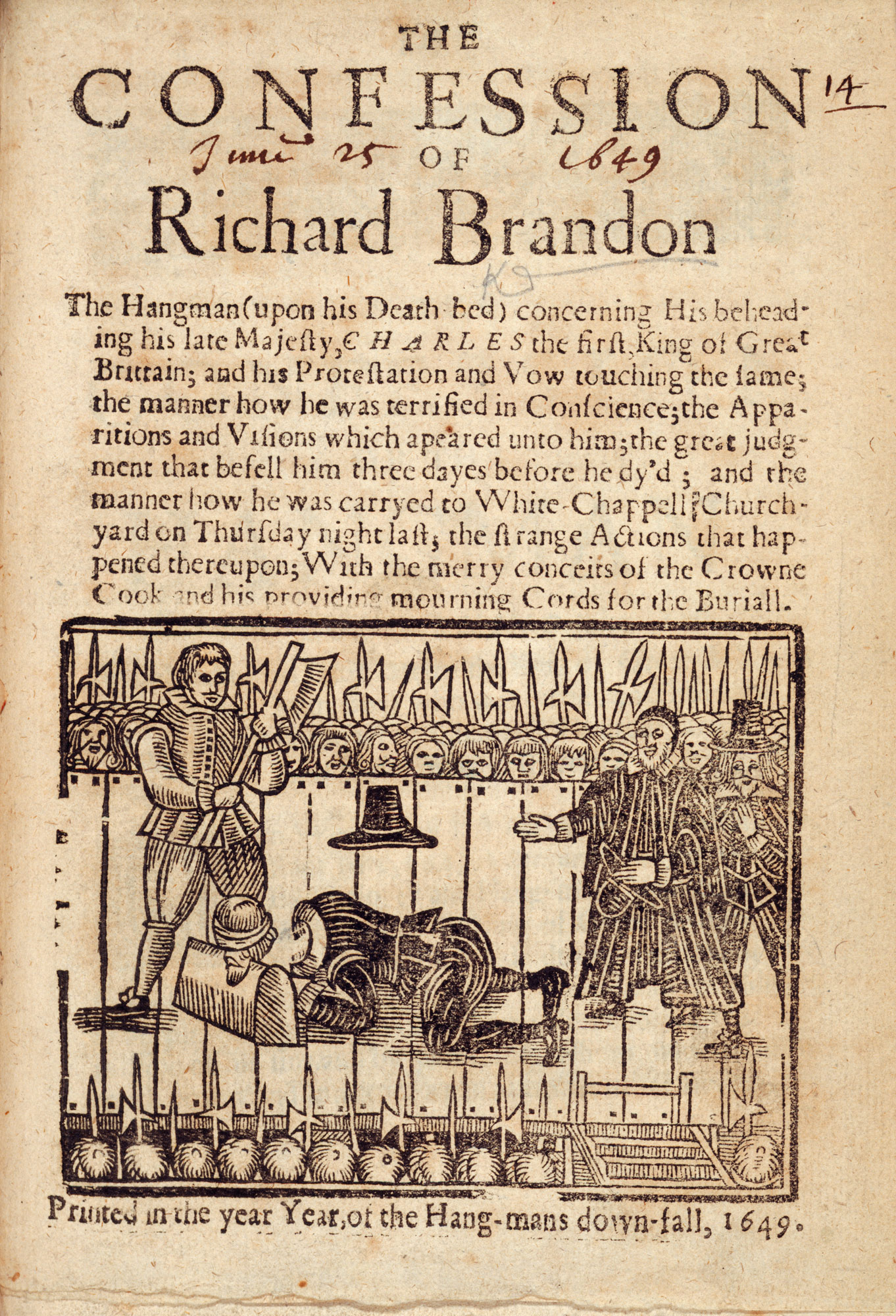
- The title page of The Confession of Richard Brandon, a 1649 pamphlet claiming to contain a confession of Richard Brandon as Charles I's executioner. The posthumous frontispiece shows Richard Brandon after the beheading of Charles I.
- Born: London, Kingdom of England
- Died: 20 June 1649; London, Commonwealth of England
- Burial place: St Mary Matfelon
- Other name: Young Gregory
- Occupation: Common executioner of London
- Years active: 1639–1649
- Known for: Possible executioner of Charles I
- Parent: Gregory Brandon

Richard Brandon (died 20 June 1649) (Note: All dates in this article are given in the Julian calendar, which was used in Great Britain throughout Richard Brandon's lifetime. However, years are assumed to start on 1 January rather than 25 March, which was the English New Year until 1752.), also known as Young Gregory, was the common executioner of London from 1639 to 1649, a role which he inherited from his father Gregory Brandon. Brandon is often named as the executioner of Charles I, though the executioner's identity is not definitively known.

== Biography ==
Brandon was born on an unknown date, most likely in London, Kingdom of England, to Gregory Brandon, the common executioner of London, and Alice Brandon. Brandon's father became executioner of London in 1611, and was then living with his family on Rosemary Lane, Whitechapel (now known as Royal Mint Street). Though little can be ascertained of Brandon's early years, rumours abounded of his gruesome upbringing as the son of London's executioner. He was rumoured to have decapitated stray cats and dogs, in training for his future position. Brandon's father, Gregory, found himself on the wrong side of the law in January 1611, when he was convicted of the manslaughter of one Simon Morton, though he was not punished thanks to a pleading of the benefit of clergy. In 1617 Gregory was the butt of a practical joke played by the members of the London College of Arms, wherein he was granted "the royal arms of Arragon, with a canton of Brabant" and thereby made into a gentleman. This joke was taken up by the people of London, who elevated Gregory to esquire, a satirical title that passed down to his successors as London's hangman. This resulted in the imprisonment of the members responsible, including the Garter Principal King of Arms, William Segar.

In his father's later years as an executioner, Brandon worked alongside him and succeeded him around 1639, ostensibly obtaining the position through inheritance. In 1641 he was imprisoned at Newgate Prison for bigamy, though he was cleared of this charge on two occasions. At this time he was living at the same address, Rosemary Lane, with his wife Mary (whether she was the allegedly bigamous wife of Brandon's or not is not recorded). As the common hangman of London, Brandon was responsible for several notable executions through the English Civil War, including Charles' advisor Thomas Wentworth, 1st Earl of Strafford, on 12 May 1641 and Archbishop of Canterbury William Laud on 10 January 1645.

Brandon was the Common Hangman of London in 1649 and he is frequently cited as the executioner of Charles I. The royalist losses of the English Civil War had led to Charles I's capture. Upon his trial, the High Court of Justice sentenced him to death for his tyrannical rule as King of England. The execution of Charles I occurred on 30 January 1649 outside the Banqueting House in Whitehall; the executioner and his assistant were hidden behind false wigs and beards, with crude masks covering their faces. Because of this, contemporary sources disagreed with each other and misidentified the executioner (one French source reported that Thomas Fairfax and Oliver Cromwell had personally executed Charles) and the precise identity of the executioner remains unknown. The execution of Charles I was carried out expertly, with a single clean cut to Charles' neck, possibly suggesting that the executioner was experienced, and pointing towards someone like Brandon who had much pride in his use of an axe. He is also reported to have received £30 around the time of the execution. He had also executed other royalists before Charles and after, including Thomas Wentworth, William Laud, and Lord Capel, indicating few moral qualms over executing political criminals. Despite this, a contemporary letter reports that he refused £200 to kill the king, and he continually denied having committed the act, even until his death in June 1649.

Richard Brandon, not to be discouraged by the death of a king, continued his job as the executioner of London. On 9 March he executed the Earl of Holland, Lord Capel, and the Duke of Hamilton, for the parliamentarians. Richard Brandon died on Wednesday 20 June 1649, and was buried the following day in the parish church of Whitechapel, St Mary Matfelon. The parish register of St Mary Matfelon records his burial: "1649. Buriall. June 21st. Rich. Brandon, a man out of Rosemary Lane." Following this is added a short notice that "this R. Brandon is supposed to have cut off the head of Charles I". This postscript was added in a different handwriting to the rest of the report and cannot be considered a reliable report of Brandon's guilt.

Three pamphlets of 1649, published shortly after Brandon's death, claimed to reveal him as the executioner of Charles I, though their authenticity is disputable. These were: The Last Will and Testament of Richard Brandon, Esquire, headsman and hangman to the Pretended Parliament; The Confession of Richard Brandon, the Hangman, 1649; and A Dialogue, or a Dispute between the Late Hangman and Death. The most notable of these tracts, The Confession of Richard Brandon, claimed to be a deathbed confession of Richard Brandon, but it is now regarded as a forgery, and apparently received little attention in its time.This tract claimed that Brandon had been paid £30 for his actions and returned home from the execution under cover of night, at 6 o'clock.

Among academic historians of the event, Philip Sidney and Basil Morgan both consider that Brandon was most likely the executioner of Charles I. Morgan claims that the "weighted probability suggests that Richard Brandon was indeed the King's executioner", considering the other attributions to be products of later "Royalist rumour-mongers"; similarly, Sidney, when weighing up the supporting and dissenting evidence considers "the mass of evidence in support of Brandon's identity with the headsman remains undeniably strong and suggestive", especially in comparison the mere rumours surrounding other suspects, such as William Hewlett and George Joyce. Contrastingly, other writers have been less ready to put forth the true culprit. Graham Edwards, in considering the evidence, claims that "several writers have their favourite nominations, all cogently argued, equally convincing and open to counter-argument", leaving the mystery open to the reader.

Gregory Brandon was said to be the illegitimate grandson or great grandson of Charles Brandon, 1st Duke of Suffolk, (Note: although the account refers to "the headsman who executed Charles I", who was popularly known, at the time, as Richard Brandon) whose

treatment of his beautiful royal wife was on a par with his low conception of his moral obligations. He neglected her, spent her money, and lived openly with a notorious woman known as Mrs. Eleanor Brandon, by whom he had an illegitimate son, Charles, who is said to have been the well-known jeweller to Queen Elizabeth, and whose son, or grandson, Gregory Brandon, was, according to tradition, the headsman who executed Charles I.

However, an ancestry of Richard Brandon from the Duke of Suffolk's illegitimate son Charles is highly unlikely. Charles Brandon died in 1551, eight years before Elizabeth I's accession to the throne, and therefore cannot be identical with the Charles Brandon who was this Queen's jeweller.

== Notoriety ==
The notoriety of Gregory and the "Young Gregory" led to "the Gregory Tree" becoming a euphemism for the gallows, and was one of the reasons for the decline in popularity of the name Gregory. The name "Gregory" became a general nickname for executioners:

Even before the days of Jack Ketch, it was customary to affix a contemptuous nickname to the holders of the office throughout the country. In the days of James I, and long afterwards, hangmen went by the name of "Gregory," after Gregory Brandon, the London executioner in the reign of that monarch. Brandon succeeded Derrick, with whose name all readers of the "Fortunes of Nigel" will be familiar.

I had better to have lived in beggary
Than to have fallen in the hands of Gregory,

says a ballad of 1617.

The two also appeared in satire and works of fiction at the time, like the print "Portrait of Archbishop Laud and Mr. Henry Burton".

== See also ==
- Thomas Derrick
- Execution of Charles I § Executioner of Charles I
- List of executioners
