= John Cook (regicide) =

Solicitor General of the English Commonwealth (1608-1660)

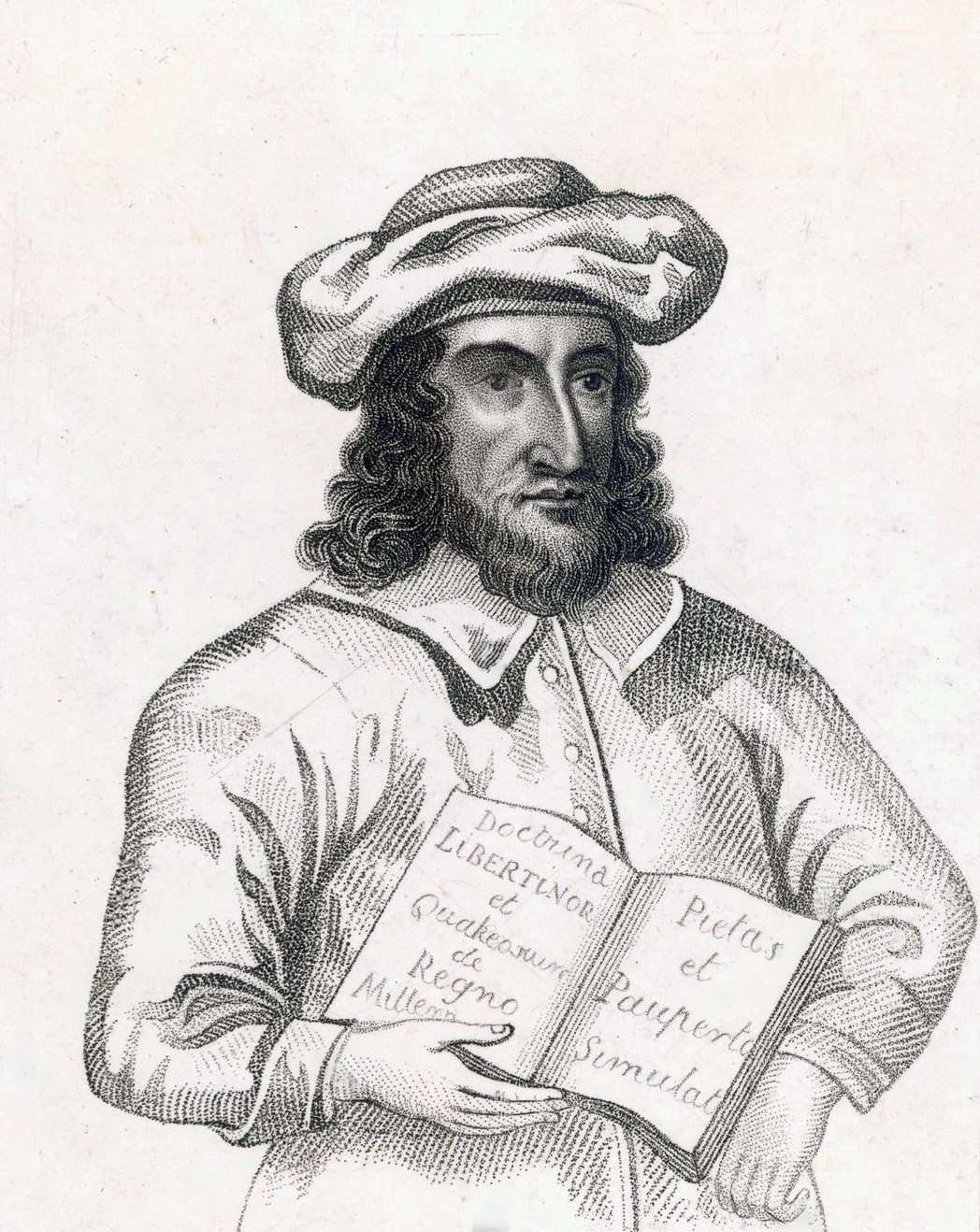
"Fictitious portrait called John Cook" by Robert Cooper in the collection of the National Portrait Gallery, London (NPG D17879).

John Cook or Cooke (baptised 18 September 1608 – 16 October 1660) was the first Solicitor General of the English Commonwealth and led the prosecution of Charles I. Following The Restoration, Cook was convicted of regicide and hanged, drawn and quartered on 16 October 1660.

== Biography ==
John Cook was the son of Leicestershire farmers Isaac and Elizabeth Cook whose farm was just outside Burbage. He was baptised on 18 September 1608 in the All Saints church in Husbands Bosworth and educated at Wadham College, Oxford, and at Gray's Inn. Cook and his first wife Frances (died 1658) had a son (name unknown). With his second wife Mary Chawner, Cook had a daughter, Freelove, who was still a baby in 1660 when Cook was executed. Prior to his appointment as prosecutor, he had established a reputation as a radical lawyer and an Independent.

Mr. John Coke, late Chief Justice of Ireland, had in his younger years seen the best part of Europe; and at Rome had spoken with such liberty and ability against the corruptions of that Court and Church, that great endeavors were used there to bring him into that interest: but he being resolved not to yield to their solicitations, thought it no longer safe to continue among them, and therefore departed to Geneva, where he resided some months in the house of signor Gio. Diodati, minister of the Italian church in that city; after which he returned to England and applied himself to the study of laws; and in that profession became so considerable, that he was appointed by the High Court of Justice to be their solicitor at the King's trial.

— Edmund Ludlow

In a 2005 biography of Cook, Geoffrey Robertson argued that Cook was a highly original and progressive lawyer: while representing John Lilburne he established the right to silence and was the first to advocate many radical reforms in law, including the cab-rank rule of advocacy, the abolition of imprisonment for debt, the abolition of the use of courtroom Latin, the fusion of law and equity and restrictions on the use of the death penalty. Cook was among the first to argue that poverty was a cause of crime and to urge probation for those who stole to feed starving families; he originated the duty to act free of charge for those who could not afford it. Although he was not fundamentally anti-monarchist, he was forced to this stance when King Charles I would not recognise the legality of the court or answer the charges of tyranny against him. Robertson writes that Cook bravely accepted his fate at the Restoration when many others compromised with the new regime.

The idea of trying a reigning king had no precedent; previous monarchs had been deposed, but had never been brought to trial as monarchs. The High Court of Justice established by an act of the Rump Parliament consisted of 135 commissioners (all firm Parliamentarians); Cook accepted the brief to lead the prosecution.

The trial of King Charles I on charges of high treason and other high crimes began on 20 January 1649, but he refused to enter a plea, claiming that no court had jurisdiction over a monarch. When Cook began to read the indictment, King Charles I twice tried to stop him by ordering him to "Hold" and twice tapping him sharply on the shoulder with his cane. Cook ignored this so King Charles then rose to speak, but Cook resumed speaking, at which point King Charles struck Cook so forcefully on the shoulder that the ornate silver tip of the cane broke off and rolled onto the floor. The King nodded to Cook to pick it up, but Cook stood his ground and after a long pause, King Charles stooped to retrieve it himself. This is considered an important historical moment that was seen as symbolising the divine monarch bowing before human law.

== Trial and execution ==
As a regicide, Cook was excluded after the Restoration of Charles II from the Indemnity and Oblivion Act which indemnified most opponents of the Monarchy for crimes they might have committed during the Civil War and Interregnum (1642–1660).

The memoirs of Edmund Ludlow give an account of Cook's trial and his public execution the next day.

...he was seized and imprisoned by Sir Charles Coote, who joining with Monk in his treachery to the Commonwealth, sent him over to England, that he might sacrifice him to his new master, in satisfaction for the blood of his party which he himself had formerly shed. Being brought to his trial, he was accused of preferring, in the name of all the good people of England, an Impeachment of High Treason to the High Court of Justice against the late King; that he had signed the said impeachment with his own hand; that upon the King's demurrer to the jurisdiction of the Court, he had pressed that the charge might be taken for confessed; and therefore had demanded judgment from the Court against the King: but this indictment being more particularly charged upon him in the three following articles: First, that he, with others, had propounded, counselled, contrived, and imagined the death of the late King. Secondly, that to bring about this conspiracy, he, with others, had assumed authority and power to accuse, kill and murder the King. Thirdly, that a person unknown did cut off the King's head; and that the prisoner was abetting, aiding, assisting, countenancing and procuring the said person so to do.

He answered, first, that he could not be justly said to have contrived or counselled the death of the King, because the proclamation for the King's trial, even by the confession of his accuser, was published on the ninth of January, which was the day before he was appointed solicitor to the High Court of Justice.

In the second place, though the Court should not admit that to be an Act of Parliament, which authorized him to do what he did; yet he assured himself they would allow it to be an order which was enough to justify him.

Thirdly, that he, who had neither been accuser, witness, jury, judge, or executioner could not be guilty of treason in this case.

He urged that having acted only as counsel, he was not answerable for the justice or injustice of the cause he had managed; that being placed in that station by a public command, it could not be said he acted maliciously or with a wicked intention, as the indictment mentioned; that words spoken do not amount to treason, much less when set down in writing by the direction of others; especially since no clear proof had been produced, that his name subscribed to the charge against the King was written by himself. He said, that to pray and demand justice, 'though injustice be done upon it', could not be treason within the statute; that when he demanded justice, it might be meant of acquittal as well as of condemnation; and that if it should be accounted treason in a council plead against the King, it must also be felony to plead against any man who may be unjustly condemned for felony; that the High Court of Justice, though now called tyrannical and unlawful, was yet a court, had officers attending them, and many thing had authority, there being then no other in this nation than that which gave them their power; and if this will not justify a man for acting within his own sphere, it will not be lawful for any one to exercise his profession unless he may be sure of the legality of the establishment under which he acts. These and divers other things of no less weight he said in his defense; but the cabal thinking themselves concerned to prevent the like in time to come and to terrify those who were not only able but willing also to be employed in such service, procured from the jury a verdict of condemnation against him according to their desire.

— Edmund Ludlow.

Thus, John Cook was tried and found guilty of high treason for his part in the trial of King Charles I. He was hanged, drawn and quartered with the radical preacher Hugh Peters and another of the regicides on 16 October 1660. Shortly before his death, aged 52, Cook wrote to his wife Mary:

We fought for the public good and would have enfranchised the people and secured the welfare of the whole groaning creation, if the nation had not more delighted in servitude than in freedom.

== Descendants ==
Cook's only known surviving child was Freelove Cook (named in Cooke's letter from his condemned cell). She was married at St Mary's Church, Newington, Surrey, on 13 June 1674, to John Gunthorpe, an apprentice goldsmith (1671) and the son of John Gunthorpe, citizen and innholder of London. John and Freelove Gunthorpe emigrated to Antigua, West Indies, before August 1677 (date on grant of Buck's Plantation to Gunthorpe); they were both dead before 9 September 1693, as indicated in the will of her mother, Mary (Chawner) Cook. John Cook's widow Mary, subsequently married John Shenton in 1669 at Barwell. Mary (Cook) Shenton died 1679. John and Freelove Gunthorpe had three sons Robert, John Junior and William (Born around 1682). John Gunthorpe Junior died in Antigua in 1740, leaving issue. William Gunthorpe had a son called William, also born in Antigua.

The journalist, historian and anti-Corn Law propagandist William Cooke Taylor (1800–1849) claimed descent from Cook.

Legal offices
Preceded by Edmund Prideaux	Solicitor General; 1649–1650	Succeeded by Robert Reynolds
