= Francis Allen (regicide) =

English financier, politician and regicide

Francis Allen (c. 1583 – 6 September 1658) was an English financier, politician and regicide who sided with parliament in the civil war against Charles I.

By the mid-1630s he had become a liveryman of the Worshipful Company of Goldsmiths where he became an activist against pressure for members to relocate their homes to Goldsmiths' Row, Cheapside. He was suspended and refused subsequent invitations to rejoin.

Allen was elected to the Long Parliament for Cockermouth in April 1642 and assisted with the financial administration of the English Civil War. In January 1644 he was part of a hostile demonstration against the earl of Essex. He later became a presbyterian elder in William Strong's church.

Following the formation of the High Court of Justice for the trial of Charles I, Allen was appointed one of the 135 commissioners. He was present when the death sentence was passed by all present. Though he did not sign the death warrant, he arranged payments and prepared accounts for the execution event

Previously an active member of the Rump Parliament, Allen was one of those bitterly attacked by Cromwell during the latter's Military Coup. Allen subsequently retired from public life.

He died in September 1658, only three days after Cromwell, and, as a deceased regicide, was named and his estate excluded from indemnity under the Restoration's Act of Indemnity 1660.
