= Owen Rowe =

Owen Rowe (c. 1592–1661), was one of the regicides of King Charles I of England.

Rowe started his life working as a haberdasher in London, but gradually became more involved with puritanical ideals. He supported and took part in the founding of the Massachusetts colony, known as a colony of Religious intolerance, as well as Bermuda. After this, he returned to London, and became a captain of the Green Regiment of London's trained bands militia. By 1642, he had been promoted to Colonel.

In 1646, Rowe was involved as one of the men who tried and convicted Charles I following his capture at the end of the First English Civil War, signing the warrant for Charles' execution. After this he moved and became Deputy-Governor of the British colony in Bermuda. Later in 1655, Rowe acted in support of opponents of Captain-General George Monck, who would eventually be a key figure in the Restoration

Rowe was arrested in 1660 and convicted of regicide by the court. He spent his time imprisoned in the tower of London, where he died in 1661.
