= Thomas Derrick =

English executioner during the Elizabethan Era

Thomas Derrick (fl. 1596 – c. 1610) was an English executioner during the Elizabethan Era.

Derrick served as a sailor in the Royal Navy during the Anglo-Spanish war and, under the command of Robert Devereux, 2nd Earl of Essex, took part in the capture of Cádiz. After the sack of the city, he was one of 24 sailors convicted of committing rapes against local women and sentenced to death by hanging. Since none of the other soldiers were willing to execute the delinquents, the Earl of Essex pardoned Derrick on the condition that he execute his co-accused. Derrick did so with startling efficiency on one of the fleet's ships, by using blocks to string up the men on the spar.

In English history, executioner was not a commonly chosen career path, because of the risk of friends and families of the deceased knowing who the executioner was and where to find him. Executioners were sometimes coerced into the role and, following the fleet's return to England, Derrick became an executioner at Tyburn. He executed more than 3,000 people in his career, including his pardoner, the Earl of Essex, when he was convicted of treason in 1601. As a nobleman, Essex was allowed to choose his execution method, and opted to be beheaded by axe. Derrick, experienced as a hangman rather than as a headsman, took three strokes to decapitate him.

Derrick devised a beam with a topping lift and pulleys for his hangings, instead of running the rope directly over the beam method, as had been the common practice. Around 1610, he constructed a gallows with which over a dozen people could be hanged at the same time. The word derrick became an eponym for the frame from which the hangman's noose was supported and through that usage (by analogy) to modern day cranes. Derrick was also the first executioner to be subject of a ballad in the English-speaking world.

Preceded by	Executioner at Tyburn	Succeeded by Gregory Brandon
