= Hugh Ross Williamson =

British popular historian and dramatist

Hugh Ross Williamson (1901–1978) was a prolific British popular historian, and a dramatist. Starting from a career in the literary world, and having a Nonconformist background, he became an Anglican priest in 1943.

In 1955 he converted to Roman Catholicism and wrote many historical works in a Catholic apologist tone. In 1956, he published his autobiography, The Walled Garden. Ross Williamson was critical of the reforms introduced by the Second Vatican Council.

== Works ==
- The poetry of T. S. Eliot (1932)
- John Hampden: a life (1933)
- Rose and glove: a play (1934)
- After the event: a play in one act (1935)
- King James I (1935)
- Gods and mortals in love (1936)
- The seven deadly virtues; In a glass darkly; Various heavens: a play sequence. (1936)
- Cinderella's grandchild: a play in one act (1936)
- Mr Gladstone: a play in three acts (1937)
- Stories from history: ten plays for schools (1938)
- Who Is for Liberty? (1939)
- George Villiers, first Duke of Buckingham: study for a biography (1940)
- A.D. 33: a tract for the times (1941)
- Captain Thomas Schofield (1942)
- Paul, a bond slave: a radio play (1945)
- Charles and Cromwell (1946)
- The arrow and the sword: an essay in detection (1947)
- Queen Elizabeth: a play in three acts (1947)
- The story without an end (1947)
- Were you there ... ?: six meditations for Holy Week (1947)
- A wicked pack of cards (1947)
- The silver bowl (1948)
- The seven Christian virtues (1949)
- Four Stuart portraits (1949)
- The evidence for the Gunpowder Plot (1950)
- The Gunpowder Plot (1951)
- Sir Walter Raleigh (1951)
- Conversation with a ghost (1952)
- Jeremy Taylor (1952)
- The story without an end (1953)
- The ancient capital: an historian in search Of Winchester (1953)
- Canterbury Cathedral (1953)
- The children's book of British saints (1953)
- His eminence of England: a play in two acts (1953)
- The children's book of French saints (1954)
- The children's book of Italian saints (1955)
- The great prayer: concerning the canon of the Mass (1955)
- James: by the grace of God (1955)
- Historical Whodunits (1955)
- Who Was the Man in the Iron Mask? (1955)
- The walled garden: an autobiography (1956)
- The beginning of the English Reformation (1957)
- Enigmas of history (1957)
- The day they killed the king (1957)
- The Challenge of Bernadette (1958)
- The Children's Book of German Saints (1958)
- The Sisters (1958)
- The Children's Book of Patron Saints (1959)
- The Conspirators and the Crown (1959)
- Young People's book of the Saints (1960)
- Teresa of Avila (1961)
- The Day Shakespeare Died (1961)
- The flowering hawthorn (1962)
- Guy Fawkes (1964)
- The modern Mass: a reversion to the reforms of Cranmer (1969)
- The cardinal in England (1970)
- The Florentine woman (1970)
- The Great Betrayal: Some Thoughts on the Invalidity of the New Mass (1970
- The last of the Valois (1971)
- Paris is worth a mass (1971)
- Kind Kit: an informal biography of Christopher Marlowe (1972)
- The Butt of Malmsey (1973)
- Catherine de' Medici (1973)
  - French: Catherine de Médicis (1979)
- Lorenzo the Magnificent (1974)
- Historical Enigmas: Comprising Historical Whodunits and Enigmas of History (1974)
- The princess a nun!: a novel without fiction (1978; completed by Julian Rathbone)
