= John Downes (regicide) =

English official who signed the death warrant of King Charles I (1609-1666)

Colonel John Downes (1609 – c. 1666) was a commissioner who signed the death warrant of Charles I of England. After the English Restoration he was found guilty of regicide and imprisoned for life.

== Background ==
John Downes' family had moved southwards from Cheshire to Warwickshire. They were said to be able to trace their Cheshire lineage back to 864 AD, according to John Parsons Earwaker's History of East Cheshire. It is said that when the King came hunting in Macclesfield Forest, a Downes held the King's stirrup whilst he mounted, while the Earl of Derby was to hold that of Downes. Derby refused on the basis of rank, instead pointing his whip at Downes' stirrup.

As far back as 864 AD there is mention of the family. It is said that certain Cheshire estates belonged to the ‘Ancient Family of Downes and Taxall’ which did service to Earl Edwin of Chester, brother in law to Harold, one of the Saxon kings of Mercia. The historian, Ormerod states that for many centuries these estates ‘were for many centuries owned by the ancient family of Downes and Taxall’.

According to Ormerod in 1339 year Queen Isabella of France granted, that in consideration of the fine which " Edmund, son of Edmund de Downes has made to us, we have pardoned to him as much as in us lies, the transgression which he made in taking to himself and his heirs, from his father, Edmund, a certain bailiwick \ballivani\ of Forestry in our Forest of Macclesfield

The Downes held various manors in Cheshire and Lancashire from as early as the 12th century. They were an ancient Forester family, like the Stanley, Grosvenor, Egerton and other Cheshire families whom they married into. They held the manors of Overton, Taxall, Shrigley, Sutton Downes and Wardley. Ormerod in his 'History of Macclesfield states that a Downes, styled the Great Lord of Downes, was Royal Forester to King Harold, the Saxon king of Mercia. This legend recounts how the Downes family acquired the coat of arms of the white stag. The King was hunting in Macclesfield Forest and became lost. Whilst all went to look for him, the Royal Forester, Downes, was resting when a white stag approached and led him to the King. The white stag was given to Downes by the King and became the family's arms. Ormerod claims the Downes family held their lands by a blast of the horn on Midsummer's Day and had many curious medieval rights including one to hang draw and quarter.

One member of the family, Roger Downes, a friend of the notorious libertine Lord Rochester, was killed in a London brawl, with his head apparently being sent to the family home at Wardley Hall. The Hall is supposed to be haunted by his ghost. They acquired Wardley Hall through marriage to a Worsley heiress.

Some of the Downes family were well known for their adherence to the Catholic faith, though in later centuries they remained Anglican. It was Francis Downes who retrieved the head of his martyred cousin Ambrose Barlow.

== Biography ==
John Downes was born at Manby in Lincolnshire. He was grandson of Rev George Downes of Nuneaton, 'descended out of Cheshire'. He was appointed an auditor of the Duchy of Cornwall in 1633 and was elected MP for Arundel, Sussex in December 1641.

A lawyer, he studied at the Inner Temple and was called to the bar in 1642. He did not fight in the English Civil War but amassed a fortune dealing in the confiscated Royalist estates. He was a close friend of Oliver Cromwell and received substantial land grants in Ireland and England.

John Downes was arrested on 18 June 1660. When soon afterwards he petitioned King Charles II for an appointment, Robert Howcott stated that he was a servant of Mr Almery who was a relation of "Collonell Downes of Hampstead". A warrant had been issued by Sir Edward Nicholas for Downes to be arrested. Robert Howcott discovered and apprehended Downes before bringing him before the King who ordered Howcott to take Downes to General Monke, who passed him on to the "martiall Generall".

On being found guilty of regicide, John Downes was condemned to death in October 1660, but the sentence was commuted to life imprisonment because he had tried to intervene on the King's behalf and only signed the death warrant after being intimidated by the other commissioners.

Downes spent the rest of his life a prisoner in the Tower of London.
