= Trial of Charles I =

1649 trial resulting in conviction of King Charles I

The Trial of Charles I
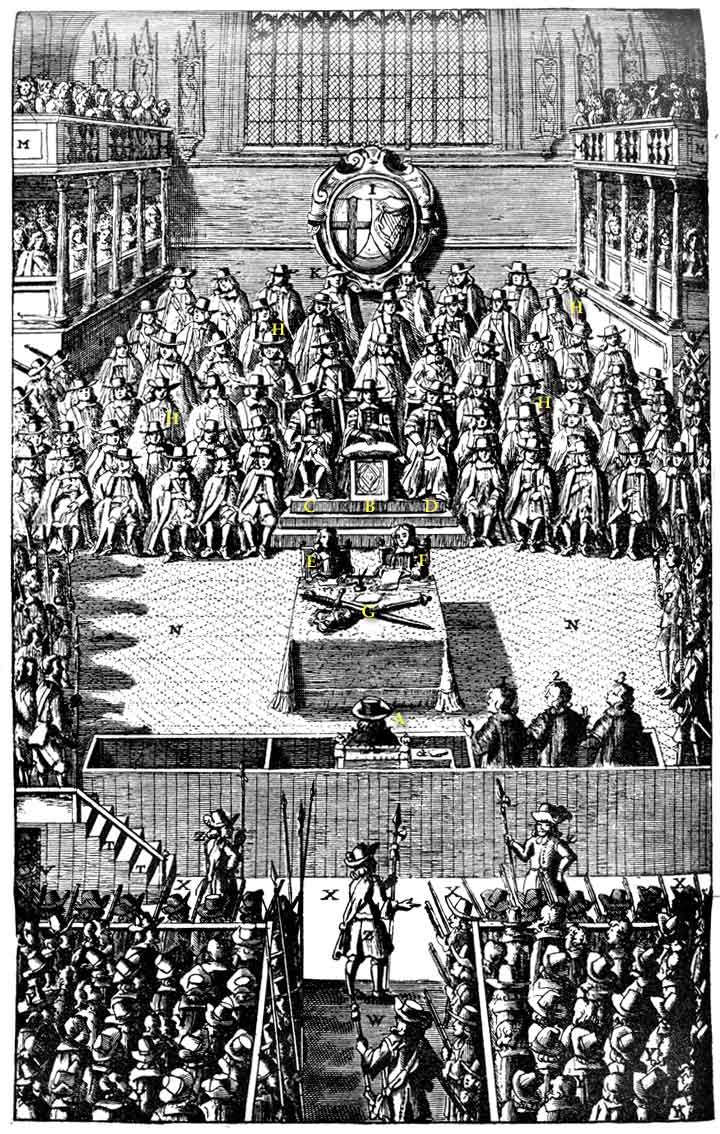
- A plate depicting the trial of Charles I in January 1649, from John Nalson's "Record of the Trial of Charles I, 1648" (Note: All dates in this article are in the Old Style (Julian calendar) used in Great Britain throughout Charles's lifetime; however, years are assumed to start on 1 January rather than 25 March (Lady Day), which was the English New Year. This is the reason why historical sources may describe the trial and execution as taking place in 1648.) in the British Museum.
- Court: High Court of Justice (Special Court created by the English Parliament)
- Full case name: The King versus The People of England
- Decided: 27 January 1649
- Transcripts: Partial transcripts and reports (no complete official transcript)

Case history
- Subsequent actions: Execution of Charles I on 30 January 1649; abolition of the monarchy and House of Lords; establishment of the Commonwealth of England
- Related actions: English Civil War; trials of other Royalists

Court membership
- Judges sitting: 59 commissioners appointed by Parliament

Case opinions
- Charles I was found guilty of high treason and crimes against the realm
- Decision by: Unanimous conviction by the High Court of Justice

The trial of Charles I took place in January 1649, marking the first time a reigning monarch was tried and executed by his own subjects. Following years of conflict during the English Civil War, which pitted the Royalists loyal to Charles I against the Parliamentarians seeking to limit his powers, the king was captured by Parliamentary forces in 1646.

In November 1648, after a series of failed negotiations and increasing tensions, the Rump Parliament established the High Court of Justice to try Charles for treason. The court was presided over by John Bradshaw, and the proceedings were marked by controversy and legal disputes, as many questioned the legitimacy of trying a king. The charges against Charles included high treason, specifically waging war against the realm and betraying the trust of the people.

In accordance with his belief that he ruled by divine right and could not be subjected to the authority of Parliament, Charles maintained a defiant stance throughout the trial, refusing to recognise the court's legitimacy. He was ultimately found guilty and sentenced to death. On 30 January 1649 Charles I was executed outside the Banqueting House in Whitehall, London. His execution sent shockwaves across Europe and heralded a new era in English governance, leading to the establishment of the Commonwealth under Oliver Cromwell. The trial and execution of Charles I remain pivotal events that challenged the traditional notions of monarchy and laid the groundwork for the modern British constitutional system.

== Background ==
During the English Civil War, Charles I clashed with Parliament over fundamental issues of governance, authority and religious practices. The conflict arose from his belief in the divine right of kings, which led him to rule without Parliament for extended periods, notably from 1629 to 1640. His attempts to impose Anglican practices, particularly in Scotland, provoked considerable backlash, leading to the Bishops' Wars. In the face of growing pressure, Charles was forced to reconvene Parliament in 1640 as the Long Parliament, but negotiations quickly deteriorated. By 1642, the situation had escalated into armed conflict as both sides mobilized their forces. Royalists loyal to the king were opposed by parliamentarians who wanted to curtail royal power and extend parliamentary authority. As the conflict dragged on, it became not only a battle for political power, but also a battle of ideologies: The Parliamentarians advocated a more democratic form of government and religious freedom, while the Royalists defended traditional monarchical authority. The war profoundly changed the English social and governmental landscape and prepared the ground for the trial of Charles I.

== Defeat and capture ==
In the mid-1640s, the tide of the English Civil War turned dramatically against King Charles I, ultimately leading to his defeat and capture. After a series of decisive battles, including the Battle of Naseby in June 1645, the Parliamentary New Model Army defeated the royalist forces. Charles fled to the Midlands in the hope of finding support there, but found himself increasingly isolated. In 1646, he surrendered to the Scottish army in Newark, believing that they would support him. However, the Scots handed him over to the English Parliament in early 1647, marking a turning point in his fortunes. During his imprisonment, Charles attempted to negotiate with various factions, but his inability to compromise meant that he scared off potential allies. The parliamentarians, suspicious of his intentions, kept him under strict control. The period from his capture to his trial in 1649 was marked by political maneuvering. Charles's attempts to escape and regain power were thwarted as he underestimated the determination of the Parliamentarians and the New Model Army. His situation deteriorated further as radical elements under Oliver Cromwell purged Parliament of their opponents and pushed for a more decisive resolution against the king.

== Establishing the court ==
After the King had been moved to London, the Rump Parliament passed a Bill setting up what was described as a High Court of Justice in order to try Charles I for high treason in the name of the people of England. The bill initially nominated 3 judges and 150 commissioners, but following opposition in the House of Lords, the judges and members of the Lords were removed. When the trial began, there were 135 commissioners who were empowered to try the King, but only 68 would ever sit in judgement. The Solicitor General John Cook was appointed prosecutor.

Charles was accused of treason against England by using his power to pursue his personal interest rather than the good of England. The charge against Charles I stated that the king, "for accomplishment of such his designs, and for the protecting of himself and his adherents in his and their wicked practices, to the same ends hath traitorously and maliciously levied war against the present Parliament, and the people therein represented", that the "wicked designs, wars, and evil practices of him, the said Charles Stuart, have been, and are carried on for the advancement and upholding of a personal interest of will, power, and pretended prerogative to himself and his family, against the public interest, common right, liberty, justice, and peace of the people of this nation". The indictment held him "guilty of all the treasons, murders, rapines, burnings, spoils, desolations, damages and mischiefs to this nation, acted and committed in the said wars, or occasioned thereby".

Although the House of Lords refused to pass the bill and royal assent naturally was lacking, the Rump Parliament referred to the ordinance as an "Act" and pressed on with the trial anyway. The intention to place the King on trial was re-affirmed on 6 January by a vote of 29 to 26 with An Act of the Commons Assembled in Parliament. At the same time, the number of commissioners was reduced to 135 – any twenty of whom would form a quorum – when the judges, members of the House of Lords and others who might be sympathetic to the King were removed.

The commissioners met to make arrangements for the trial on 8 January when well under half were present – a pattern that was to be repeated at subsequent sessions. On 10 January, John Bradshaw was chosen as President of the Court. During the following ten days, arrangements for the trial were completed; the charges were finalised and the evidence to be presented was collected.

== Trial proceeding ==
On 20 January 1649, in Westminster Hall, the trial began with a moment of high drama. After the proceedings were declared open, Solicitor General John Cook rose to announce the indictment. Standing immediately to the right of the King, he began to speak, but he had uttered only a few words when Charles attempted to stop him by tapping him sharply on the shoulder with his cane and ordering him to "Hold". Cook ignored him and continued, so Charles poked him a second time and rose to speak, but Cook continued. At that point Charles, incensed at being ignored, struck Cook across the shoulder with his cane so forcefully that the ornate silver tip broke off, rolled down Cook's gown and clattered onto the floor between them. Nobody was willing to pick it up for him, so Charles had to stoop down to retrieve it himself.

When given the opportunity to speak, Charles refused to enter a plea, claiming that no court had jurisdiction over a monarch. He believed that his own authority to rule had been due to the divine right of kings given to him by God, and by the traditions and laws of England when he was crowned and anointed, and that the power wielded by those trying him was simply that of force of arms. Charles insisted that the trial was illegal, explaining, "No learned lawyer will affirm that an impeachment can lie against the King ... one of their maxims is, that the King can do no wrong." Charles asked "I would know by what power I am called hither. I would know by what authority, I mean lawful [authority]". Charles maintained that the House of Commons on its own could not try anybody, and so he refused to plead. The court challenged the doctrine of sovereign immunity and proposed that "the King of England was not a person, but an office whose every occupant was entrusted with a limited power to govern 'by and according to the laws of the land and not otherwise'."

The court proceeded as if the king had pleaded guilty (pro confesso), rather than subjecting Charles to the peine forte et dure, that is, pressing with stones, as was standard practice in case of a refusal to plead. However, witnesses were heard by the judges for "the further and clearer satisfaction of their own judgement and consciences". Thirty witnesses were summoned, but some were later excused. The evidence was heard in the Painted Chamber rather than Westminster Hall. King Charles was not present to hear the evidence against him and he had no opportunity to question witnesses.

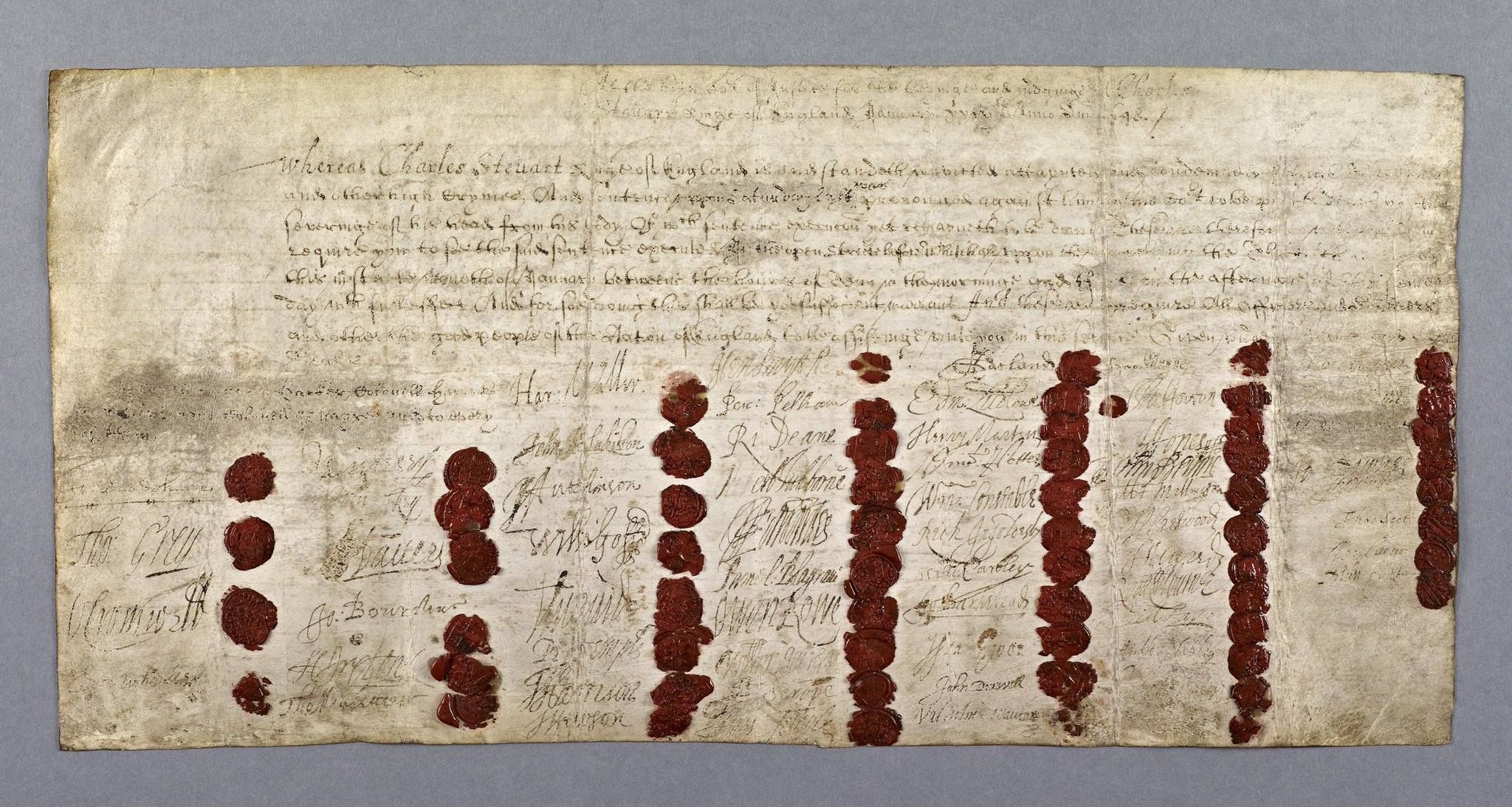
Death warrant of Charles I

The King was declared guilty at a public session on Saturday 27 January 1649 and sentenced to death. His sentence read: "That the court being satisfied that he, Charles Stuart, was guilty of the crimes of which he had been accused, did judge him tyrant, traitor, murderer, and public enemy to the good people of the nation, to be put to death by the severing of his head from his body." To show their agreement with the sentence, all of the 57 Commissioners who were present rose to their feet. During the rest of that day and on the following day, signatures were collected for his death warrant. It was eventually signed by 59 of the Commissioners, including two who had not been present when the sentence was passed.

== Execution ==
King Charles was beheaded in front of the Banqueting House of the Palace of Whitehall on 30 January 1649. He declared that he had desired the liberty and freedom of the people as much as any;

but I must tell you that their liberty and freedom consists in having government. ... It is not their having a share in the government; that is nothing appertaining unto them. A subject and a sovereign are clean different things.

Francis Allen arranged payments and prepared accounts for the execution event.

== Aftermath ==
Following the execution of Charles I, there was further large-scale fighting in Ireland, Scotland and England, known collectively as the Third English Civil War. A year and a half after the execution, Prince Charles was proclaimed King Charles II by the Scots and he led an invasion of England where he was defeated at the Battle of Worcester. This marked the end of the civil wars.

== The High Court of Justice during the Interregnum ==
Even though the High Court of Justice was an ad hoc tribunal that was specifically created for the purpose of trying the king, the name continued to be used during the interregnum (the period from the execution of Charles I until the restoration). James, Duke of Hamilton was tried and executed on 9 March 1649 by the 'High Court of Justice'.

In subsequent years the High Court of Justice was reconstituted under the following Acts, all voided upon the Restoration since they did not receive royal assent:

- 26 March 1650: An Act for Establishing an High Court of Justice
- 27 August 1650: An Act giving further Power to the High Court of Justice
- 10 December 1650: An Act for Establishing an High Court of Justice within the Counties of Norfolk, Suffolk, Huntington, Cambridge, Lincoln, and the Counties of the Cities of Norwich and Lincoln, and within the Isle of Ely.
- 21 November 1653: An Act For The Establishing An High Court of Justice.

On 30 June 1654, John Gerard and Peter Vowell were tried for high treason by the High Court of Justice sitting in Westminster Hall. They had planned to assassinate the Lord Protector Oliver Cromwell and restore Charles II as king. The plotters were found guilty and executed.

== The restoration and beyond ==
After the Restoration in 1660, all who had been active in the court that had tried and sentenced Charles I were targets for the new king. Most of those who were still alive attempted to flee the country. Many fled to the Continent while several of the regicides were sheltered by leaders of New Haven Colony. With the exception of the repentant and eventually pardoned Richard Ingoldsby, all those that were captured were executed or sentenced to life imprisonment.

The charges against the king were echoed in the American colonists against George III a century later, that the king had been "trusted with a limited power to govern by and according to the laws of the land, and not otherwise; and by his trust, oath, and office, being obliged to use the power committed to him for the good and benefit of the people, and for the preservation of their rights and liberties; yet, nevertheless, out of a wicked design to erect and uphold in himself an unlimited and tyrannical power to rule according to his will, and to overthrow the rights and liberties of the people..."
