= Anglo-Scottish war (1650–1652) =

English invasion and conquest of Scotland

- Part of Wars of the Three Kingdoms
- Cromwell at Dunbar (1886)
Date	22 July 1650 – 1652
Location	Scotland and England
Result	English victory
Territorial changes	Scotland absorbed into the Commonwealth of England

Belligerents
Scotland	England

Commanders and leaders
Charles II; David Leslie	Oliver Cromwell

The Anglo-Scottish war (1650–1652), also known as the Third Civil War, was the final conflict in the Wars of the Three Kingdoms, a series of armed conflicts and political machinations between shifting alliances of religious and political factions in England, Scotland and Ireland.

The 1650 English invasion of Scotland was a pre-emptive military incursion by the English Commonwealth's New Model Army, intended to allay the risk of Charles II invading England with a Scottish army. The First and Second English Civil Wars, in which English Royalists, loyal to Charles I, fought Parliamentarians for control of the country, took place between 1642 and 1648. When the Royalists were defeated for the second time the English government, exasperated by the duplicity of Charles I during negotiations, set up a High Court of Justice which found the King guilty of treason and executed him on 30 January 1649. At the time, England and Scotland were separate independent kingdoms, joined politically through a personal union; Charles I was, separately, both the King of Scotland, and the King of England. The Scots had fought in support of the English Parliamentarians in the First English Civil War, but sent an army in support of Charles I into England during the Second English Civil War. The Parliament of Scotland, which had not been consulted before the execution, declared his son, Charles II, King of Britain.

In 1650 Scotland was rapidly raising an army. The leaders of the English Commonwealth government felt threatened and on 22 July the New Model Army under Oliver Cromwell invaded Scotland. The Scots, commanded by David Leslie, retreated to Edinburgh and refused battle. After a month of manoeuvring, Cromwell unexpectedly led the English army out of Dunbar in a night attack on 3 September and heavily defeated the Scots. The survivors abandoned Edinburgh and withdrew to the strategic bottleneck of Stirling. The English secured their hold over southern Scotland, but were unable to advance past Stirling. On 17 July 1651 the English crossed the Firth of Forth in specially constructed boats and defeated the Scots at the Battle of Inverkeithing on 20 July. This cut off the Scottish army at Stirling from its sources of supply and reinforcements.

Charles II, believing that the only alternative was surrender, invaded England in August. Cromwell pursued, few Englishmen rallied to the Royalist cause and the English raised a large army. Cromwell brought the badly outnumbered Scots to battle at Worcester on 3 September and completely defeated them, marking the end of the Wars of the Three Kingdoms. Charles II was one of the few to escape. This demonstration that the English were willing to fight to defend the republic and capable of doing so effectively strengthened the position of the new English government. The defeated Scottish government was dissolved and the kingdom of Scotland was absorbed into the Commonwealth. Following much in-fighting Cromwell ruled as Lord Protector. After his death, further in-fighting resulted in Charles II being crowned King of England on 23 April 1661, twelve years after being crowned by the Scots. This completed the Stuart Restoration.

== Terminology ==
Some historians have referred to the conflict, which followed the First and Second English Civil Wars, as the Third Civil War. This view has been criticised: John Philipps Kenyon and Jane Ohlmeyer noted that the conflict was not an exclusively English affair, so cannot be considered part of the English Civil War; the historian Austin Woolrych observed that it was almost entirely a conflict between Scottish and English forces, involving very few English soldiers fighting on behalf of the King at the final battle at Worcester, so it was "seriously misleading" to refer to it as a civil war. Although the conflict was certainly a part of the wider Wars of the Three Kingdoms, rather than being a continuation of the English Civil War, it was by this stage a war between Scotland, ruled by the Covenanting government under Charles II, and the English Commonwealth.

== Background ==
=== Bishops' Wars and English Civil Wars ===
In 1639, and again in 1640, Charles I, who was king of both Scotland and England in a personal union, went to war with his Scottish subjects in the Bishops' Wars. These had arisen from the Scots' refusal to accept the attempts of Charles I to reform the Scottish Kirk to bring it into line with English religious practices. Charles I was not successful in these endeavours, and the ensuing settlement established the Covenanters' hold on Scottish government, requiring all civil office-holders, parliamentarians and clerics to sign the National Covenant, and giving the Scottish Parliament the authority to approve all the King's councillors in Scotland. After years of rising tensions the relationship between Charles I and his English Parliament broke down, starting the First English Civil War in 1642.

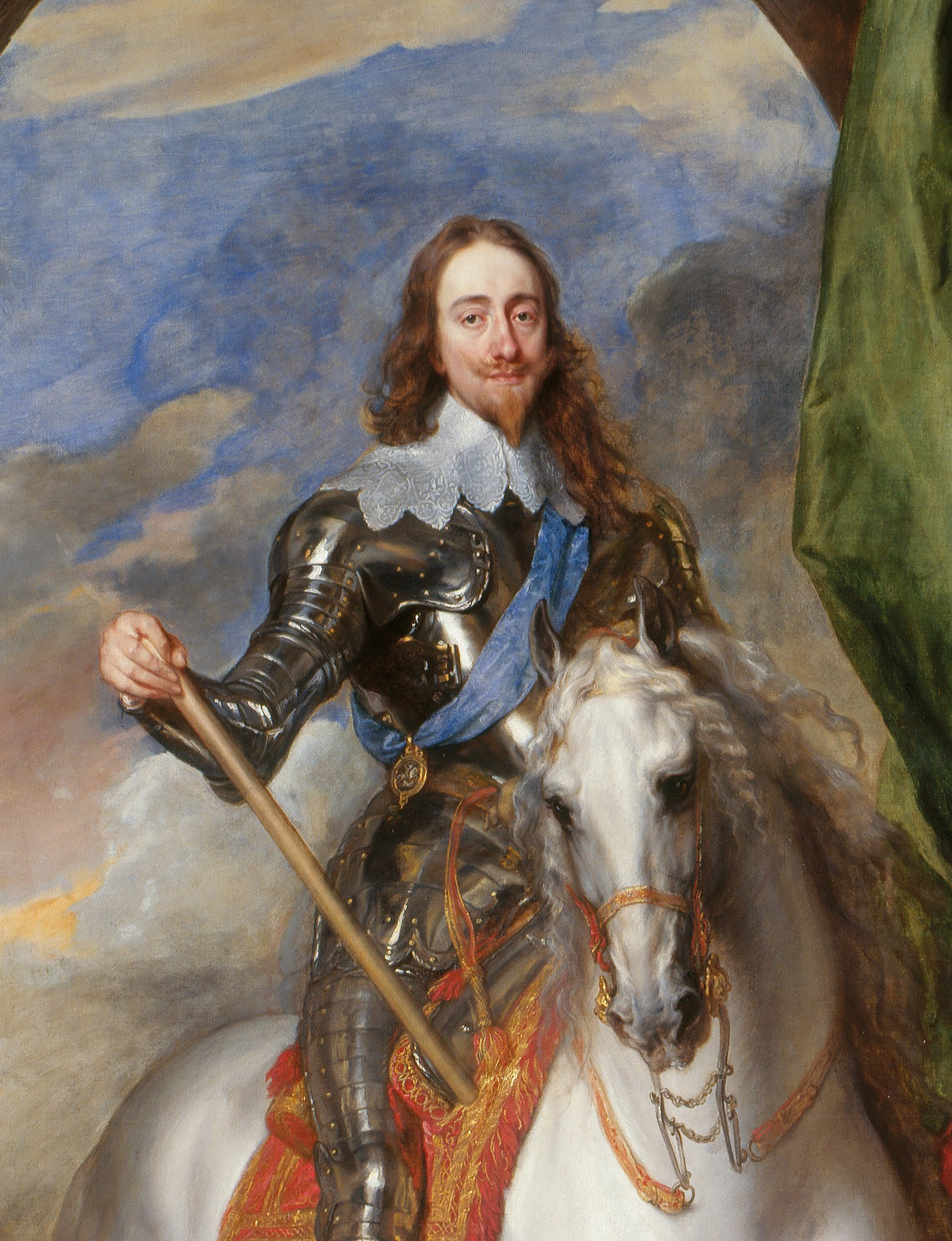
Charles I

In England the supporters of Charles I, the Royalists (Cavaliers), were opposed by the combined forces of the Parliamentarians (Roundheads) and the Scots. In 1643 the latter pair formed an alliance bound by the Solemn League and Covenant, in which the English Parliament agreed to reform the English church along similar lines to the Scottish Kirk in return for the Scots' military assistance. After four years of war the Royalists were defeated and Charles I surrendered to the Scots at their camp near Newark-on-Trent on 5 May 1646. The Scots agreed with the English Parliament on a peace settlement which would be put before the King. Known as the Newcastle Propositions, it would have required all the king's subjects in Scotland, England and Ireland to sign the Solemn League and Covenant, brought the church in each kingdom into accordance with the Covenant and with Presbyterianism, and ceded much of secular authority of Charles I as king of England to the English Parliament. The Scots spent some months trying to persuade Charles I to agree to these terms, but he refused to do so. The Scottish army had remained in England after the war, pending payment of the large subsidy the Parliamentarians had promised. A financial settlement was reached, the Scots handed Charles I over to the English Parliamentary forces and they left England on 3 February 1647.

Charles I now engaged in separate negotiations with different factions. Presbyterian English Parliamentarians and the Scots wanted him to accept a modified version of the Newcastle Propositions, but in June 1647, Cornet George Joyce of the New Model Army seized Charles I, and the army council pressed him to accept the Heads of Proposals, a less demanding set of terms which, crucially, did not require a Presbyterian reformation of the church. He rejected these as well and instead signed an offer known as the Engagement, which had been thrashed out with the Scottish delegation, on 26 December 1647. Charles I agreed to confirm the Solemn League and Covenant by Act of Parliament in both kingdoms, and to accept Presbyterianism in England, but only for a trial period of three years, in return for the Scots' assistance in regaining his throne in England.

When the delegation returned to Edinburgh with the Engagement, the Scots were bitterly divided on whether to ratify its terms. Its supporters, who became known as the Engagers, argued that it offered the best chance the Scots would get of acceptance of the Covenant across the three kingdoms, and that rejecting it risked pushing Charles I to accept the Heads of Proposals. It was opposed by those who believed that to send an army into England on behalf of the King would be to break the Solemn League and Covenant, and that it offered no guarantee of a lasting Presbyterian church in England; the Kirk went so far as to issue a declaration on 5 May 1648 condemning the Engagement as a breach of God's law. After a protracted political struggle, the Engagers gained a majority in the Scottish Parliament, by which time war had again broken out in England between Royalists and Parliamentarians. The Scots sent an army under the command of the Duke of Hamilton into England to fight on behalf of the King in July, but it was heavily defeated at Preston and then Winwick in August 1648 by a force led by Oliver Cromwell. The rout of the Engager army led to further political upheaval in Scotland, and the faction opposed to the Engagement was able to gain control of the government, with the assistance of a group of English Parliamentary cavalry led by Cromwell.

=== Death of Charles I ===
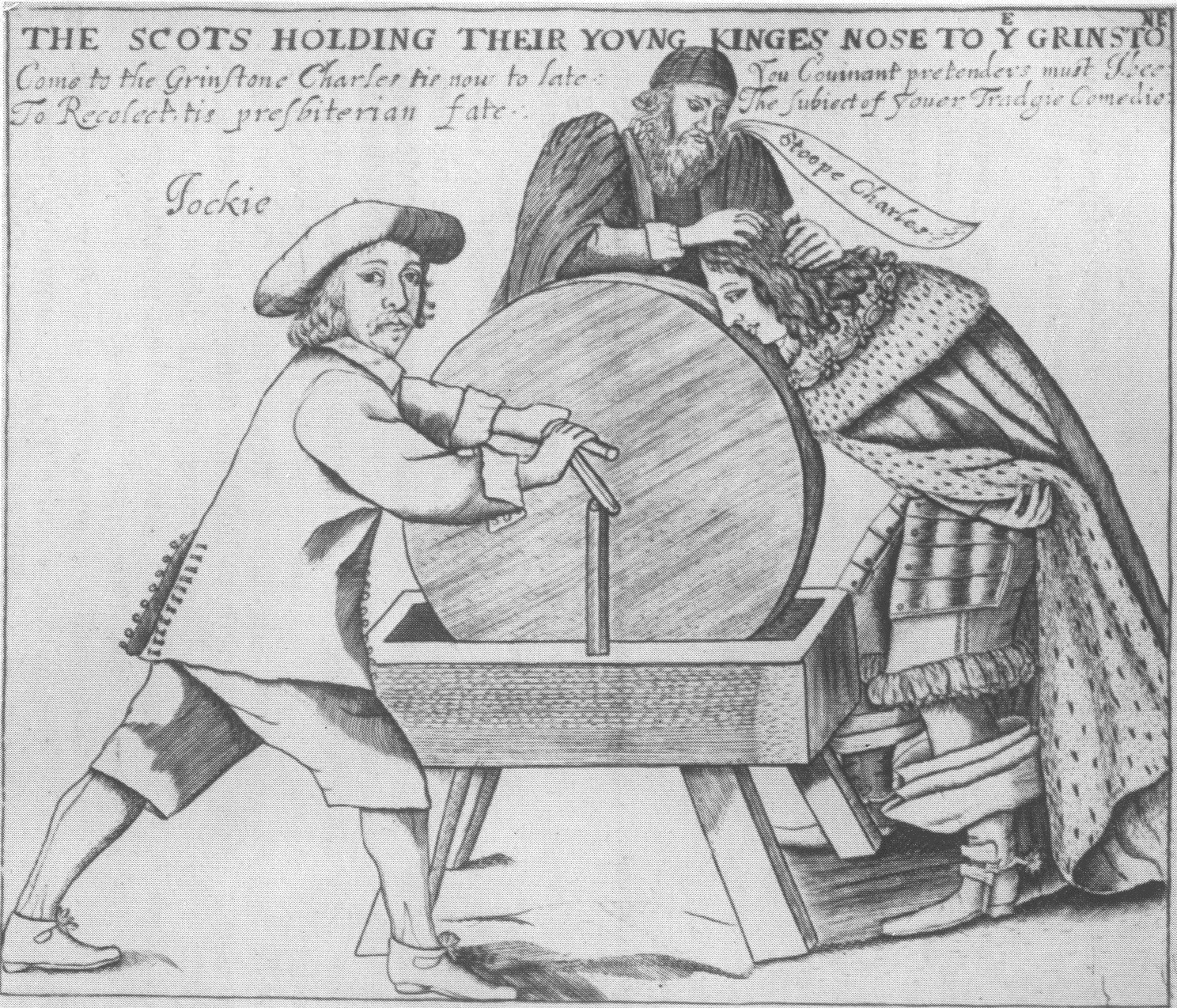
A contemporary English view of the Scots imposing conditions on Charles II in return for their support

Exasperated by the duplicity of Charles I and by the English Parliament's refusal to stop negotiating with him and accept the demands of the New Model Army, the Army purged Parliament and established the Rump Parliament, which appointed a High Court of Justice to try Charles I for treason against the English people. He was convicted and on 30 January 1649 beheaded. On 19 May, with the establishment of the Commonwealth of England, the country became a republic. The Scottish Parliament, which had not been consulted before the king's execution, declared his son Charles II, King of Britain. Before they would permit him to return from exile in the Dutch Republic to take up his crown, they demanded he sign both Covenants: recognising the authority of the Kirk in religious matters, and that of Parliament in civil affairs. Charles II was initially reluctant to accept these conditions, but after Cromwell's campaign in Ireland crushed his Royalist supporters there, he felt compelled to accept the Scottish terms, and signed the Treaty of Breda on 1 May 1650. The Scottish Parliament set about rapidly recruiting an army to support the new king, and Charles II set sail to Scotland, landing on 23 June.

== English invasion of Scotland (1650–1652) ==
Location of several places mentioned in the text shown on a map of southern Scotland

The leaders of the English Commonwealth felt threatened by the Scots reassembling an army. They pressed Thomas Fairfax, lord general of the New Model Army, to launch a pre-emptive attack. Fairfax accepted the commission to lead the army north to defend against the possibility of a Scottish invasion, but was unwilling to strike the first blow against his former allies, believing England and Scotland were still bound by the Solemn League and Covenant. When a formal order to attack came on 20 June 1650, Fairfax resigned his commission. A parliamentary committee which included Cromwell, his close friend, attempted to dissuade him, pleading with him over the course of a whole night to change his mind, but Fairfax remained resolute, and retired from public life. Cromwell succeeded to his office as lord general, becoming commander-in-chief of the New Model Army. He received his commission on 28 June, and set out for Scotland the same day, crossing the Tweed at the head of 16,000 men on 22 July.

Once the Treaty of Breda had been signed, the Scottish Parliament started levying men to form a new army, under the command of the experienced general David Leslie. Their aim was to increase their forces to more than 36,000 men, but that number was never achieved; by the time Cromwell entered Scotland, Leslie had fewer than 10,000 infantry and 3,000 cavalry, although these numbers fluctuated during the course of the campaign. The government instituted a commission to purge the army of anyone suspected of having supported the Engagement, as well as men considered sinful or undesirable. (Note: The Committee for Purging the Army, established on 21 June.) This was opposed, unsuccessfully, by much of the Scottish nobility and most of the experienced military leaders, including Leslie. The purge removed many experienced men and officers, and the bulk of the army was composed of raw recruits with little training or experience.

Leslie prepared a defensive line of earthworks between Edinburgh and Leith, and employed a scorched earth policy between this line and the English border. He then allowed Cromwell to advance unopposed. Lack of supplies, and the hostility of the local people towards the English invaders forced Cromwell to rely on a seaborne supply chain, and he captured the ports of Dunbar and Musselburgh to facilitate this. Operations were hampered by persistent bad weather. These adverse conditions caused a shortage of food and much sickness in the English army, substantially reducing its strength.

Oliver Cromwell

Cromwell attempted to bring the Scots to battle at Edinburgh. He advanced on Leslie's lines on 29 July, capturing Arthur's Seat and bombarding Leith from Salisbury Crags. Cromwell was not able to draw Leslie out, and the English retired to their camp at Musselburgh, where they were subjected to a night raid by a party of Scottish cavalry. Cromwell's attack coincided with a visit by Charles II to the Scottish army, where he was warmly received. Members of the Covenanter government, concerned that their godly war would be corrupted by feelings of personal loyalty to the King, asked Charles II to leave. They then ordered a new purge, which was quickly enacted in early August, removing 80 officers and 4,000 of Leslie's men. This damaged morale as well as weakening the army's strength.

Throughout August Cromwell continued to try and draw the Scots out from their defences to enable a set piece battle. Leslie resisted, ignoring pressure from the secular and religious Scottish hierarchy to attack Cromwell's weakened army. He reasoned that the persistent bad weather, the difficult English supply situation, and the dysentery and fever that had broken out in the English camp would force Cromwell to withdraw back into England before winter set in.

On 31 August Cromwell did withdraw; the English army reached Dunbar on 1 September, having taken two days to march the 17 miles (27 km) from Musselburgh, harassed day and night by the pursuing Scots. The road was left littered with abandoned equipment and the men arrived hungry and demoralised. The Scottish army outflanked the English, blocking the road to Berwick and England at the easily defended Cockburnspath Defile. Their main force encamped on the 177-metre-high (581 ft) Doon Hill, 2 miles (3 km) south of Dunbar, where it overlooked the town and the coastal road running south west from the town. The hill was all but invulnerable to direct assault. The English army had lost its freedom of manoeuvre, although they could supply themselves by sea and, if need be, evacuate the army the same way. On 2 September Cromwell surveyed the situation, and wrote to the governor of Newcastle warning him to prepare for a possible Scottish invasion.

=== Battle of Dunbar ===
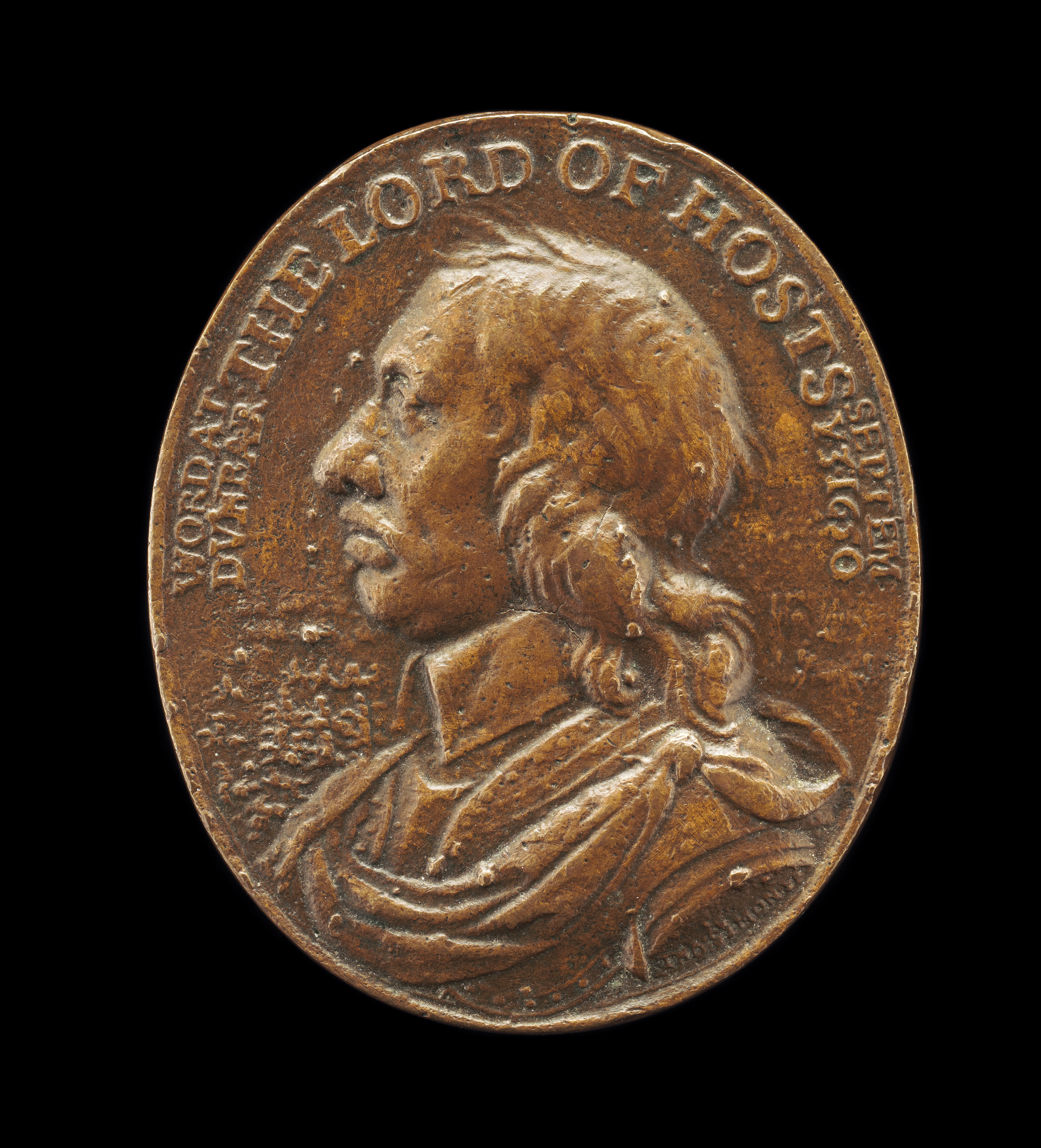
The Dunbar victory medal

Believing the English army was in a hopeless situation and under pressure to finish it off rapidly, Leslie moved his army off the hill and into a position to attack Dunbar. On the night of 2-3 September Cromwell manoeuvred his army so as to be able to launch a concentrated pre-dawn attack against the Scots' right wing. Whether this was part of a plan to decisively defeat them, or part of an attempt to break through and escape back to England is debated by historians. The Scots were caught by surprise, but put up a stout resistance. Their cavalry were pushed back by the English, and Leslie was unable to deploy most of his infantry into the battle because of the terrain. The battle was undecided when Cromwell personally led his cavalry reserve in a flank attack on the two Scottish infantry brigades that had managed to come to grips with the English and rolled up the Scottish line. Leslie executed a fighting withdrawal, but some 6,000 Scots, from his army of 12,000, were taken prisoner, and approximately 1,500 killed or wounded. The prisoners were taken to England; many died on the march south, or in captivity. At least some of those who survived were deported to become indentured workers on English possessions in North America.

=== Scottish retreat ===
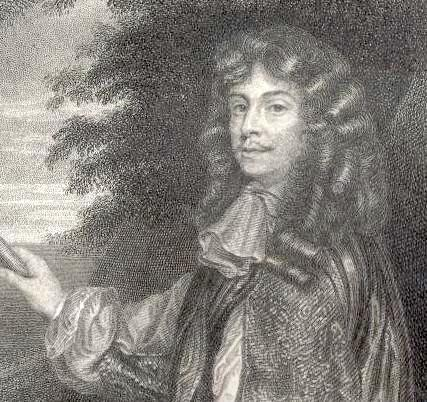
David Leslie

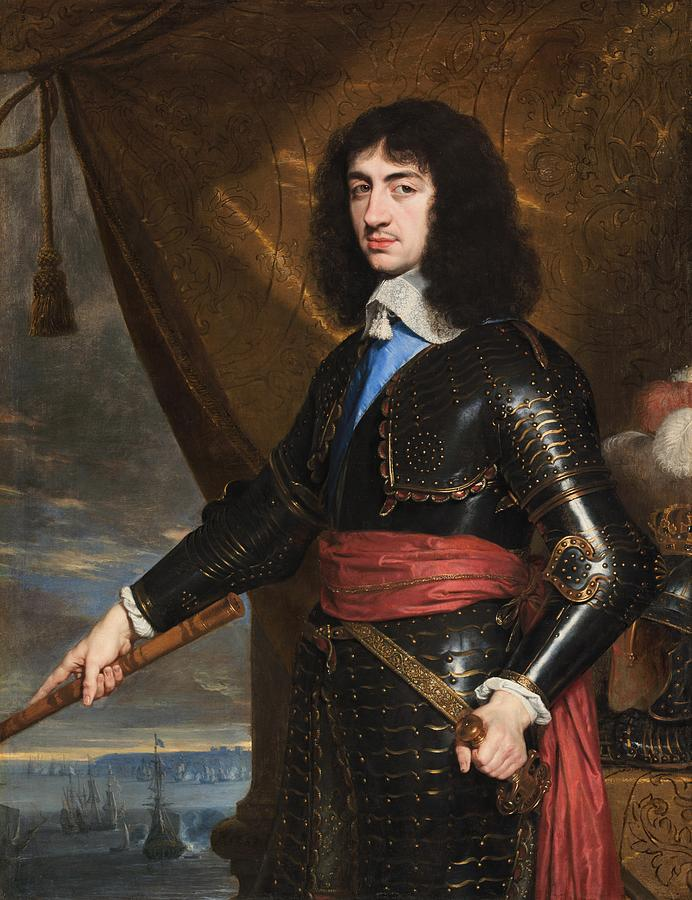
Charles II, c. 1653

When the news of the defeat reached Edinburgh, many people fled the city in panic, but Leslie sought to rally what remained of his army, and established a new defensive line at the strategic choke point of Stirling. There he was joined by the bulk of the government, clergy, and Edinburgh's mercantile elite. Major-general John Lambert was sent to capture Edinburgh, which fell on 7 September, while Cromwell marched on the port of Leith, which offered much better facilities for landing supplies and reinforcements than Dunbar. Without Leslie's army to defend them, both were captured with little difficulty. Cromwell took pains to persuade the citizens of Edinburgh that his war was not with them; he promised their property would be respected, and allowed them to come and go freely, hold markets, and observe their usual religious services, although the latter were restricted as most of the clergy had removed to Stirling. He also took steps to secure food for the city, which by this point was short on supplies. Edinburgh Castle held out until December, but since it was cut off from reinforcement and supplies and offered no threat, Cromwell did not assault it, and treated its commander with courtesy. Austin Woolrych described the behaviour of the occupying troops as "exemplary", and observed that after a short time many fugitives returned to the city, and its economic life returned to something akin to normality.

The defeat at Dunbar caused great damage to Leslie's reputation and authority. He attempted to resign as head of the army, but the Scottish government would not permit it, largely because of a lack of any plausible replacement. Several of his officers refused to take orders from him, and left Leslie's forces to join a new army being raised by the Western Association. Divisions already present in the Scottish government were widened by the new situation. The more practical blamed the purges for Leslie's defeat, and looked to bring the Engagers back into the fold; the more dogmatic thought God had deserted them because the purges had not gone far enough, and argued that too much faith had been put in a worldly prince who was not sufficiently committed to the cause of the Covenant. These more radical elements issued the divisive Western Remonstrance, which castigated the government for its failure to properly purge the army, and further widened the rifts between the Scots. The Remonstrants, as this group became known, took command of the Western Association army, and attempted to negotiate with Cromwell, urging him to depart Scotland and leave them in control; Cromwell rejected their advances and comprehensively destroyed their army at the Battle of Hieton (near the centre of modern Hamilton) on 1 December.

=== Battle of Inverkeithing ===
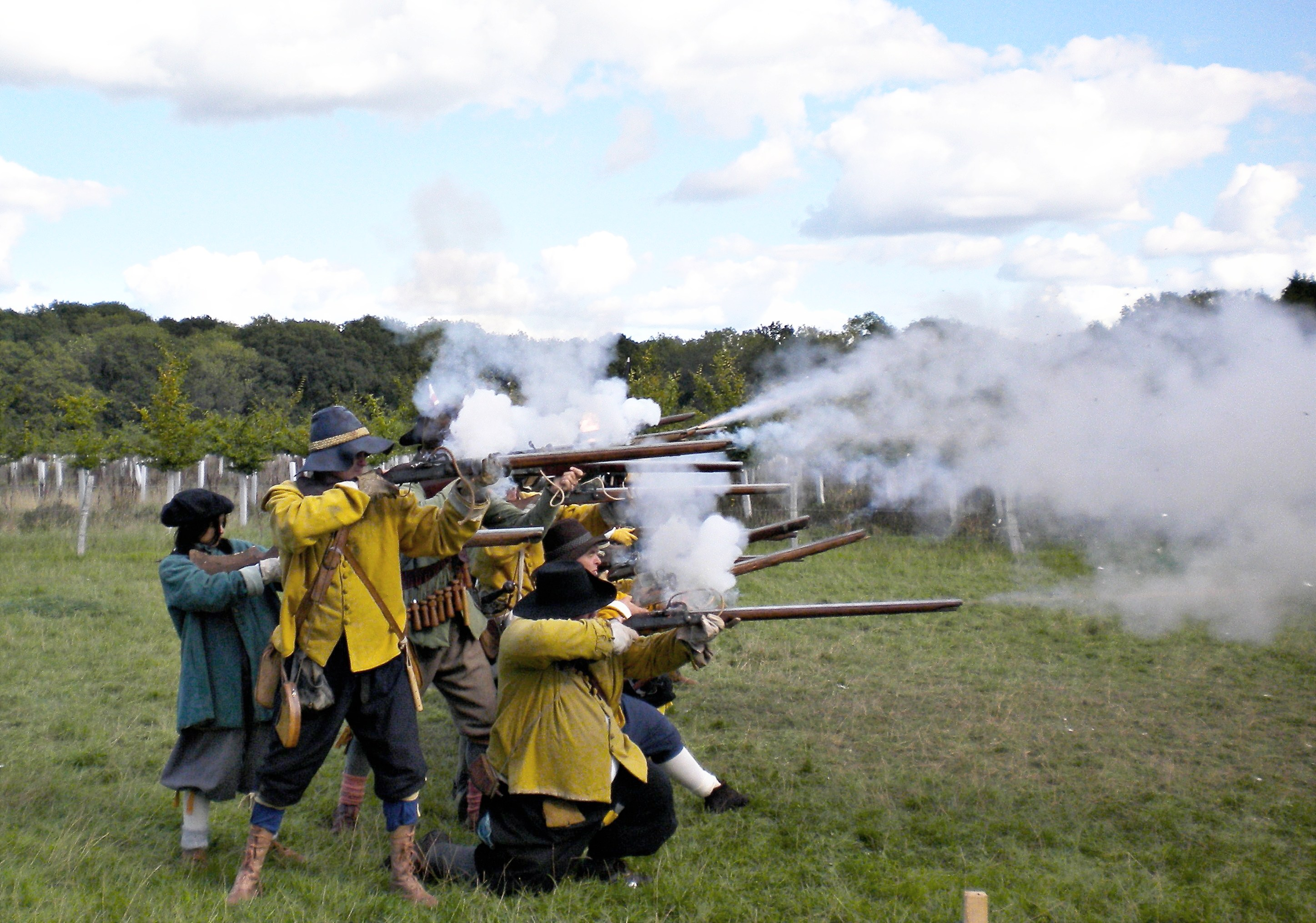
A modern re-enactment of a battle of the period

During December 1650 Charles II and the Scottish government reconciled with the Engagers and those Highland chiefs who had been excluded due to their refusal to sign the Covenant. These competing factions were poorly coordinated and it was not until the late spring of 1651 that they were fully integrated into the Scottish army. In January 1651 the English attempted to outflank Stirling by shipping a force across the Firth of Forth, but this was unsuccessful. In early February the English army advanced against Stirling, then retreated in dreadful weather, Cromwell falling ill.

In late June the Scottish army advanced south. The English moved north from Edinburgh to meet them, but Leslie positioned his army north of Falkirk, behind the River Carron. This position was too strong for Cromwell to assault; Leslie resisted every provocation to fight another open battle and eventually withdrew. Cromwell followed and attempted to bypass Stirling, but was unable to. He then marched to Glasgow and sent raiding parties into Scottish-held territory. The Scottish army shadowed the English, moving south west to Kilsyth on 13 July.

Early on 17 July, an English force of 1,600 men under Colonel Robert Overton crossed the Firth of Forth at its narrowest point in 50 specially constructed flat-bottomed boats, landing at North Queensferry on the isthmus leading from the port to the mainland. The Scottish garrison at Burntisland moved towards the English landing place and sent for reinforcements from Stirling and Dunfermline. The Scots dug in and awaited their reinforcements, and for four days the English shipped the balance of their own force across the Forth and Lambert took command.

On 20 July the Scots, more than 4,000 strong and commanded by Major-general James Holborne advanced against the English force of approximately 4,000 men. After a ninety-minute hiatus the cavalry of both forces engaged on each flank. In both cases the Scots initially had the better of it, but failed to exploit their advantage, were counter-charged by the English reserves, and routed. The previously unengaged Scottish infantry attempted to retreat, but suffered heavy casualties in the running battle that ensued, losing many men killed or captured.

After the battle, Lambert marched 6 miles (10 km) east and captured the deep-water port of Burntisland. Cromwell shipped most of the English army there, assembling 13,000 to 14,000 men by 26 July. He then ignored the Scottish army at Stirling and on 31 July marched on the seat of the Scottish government at Perth, which he besieged. Perth surrendered after two days, cutting off the Scottish army from reinforcements, provisions and materiel. Cromwell deliberately left the route south clear, reckoning that if the Scots abandoned their defensive positions, then once in the open they could be destroyed. Charles II and Leslie, seeing no hope of victory if they stayed to face Cromwell, marched south on 31 July in a desperate bid to raise Royalist support in England. By this time they had only around 12,000 men, who were very short of firearms. Cromwell and Lambert followed, shadowing the Scottish army while leaving Lieutenant-general George Monck with 5,000 men in Scotland to mop up what resistance remained.

=== Mopping up ===
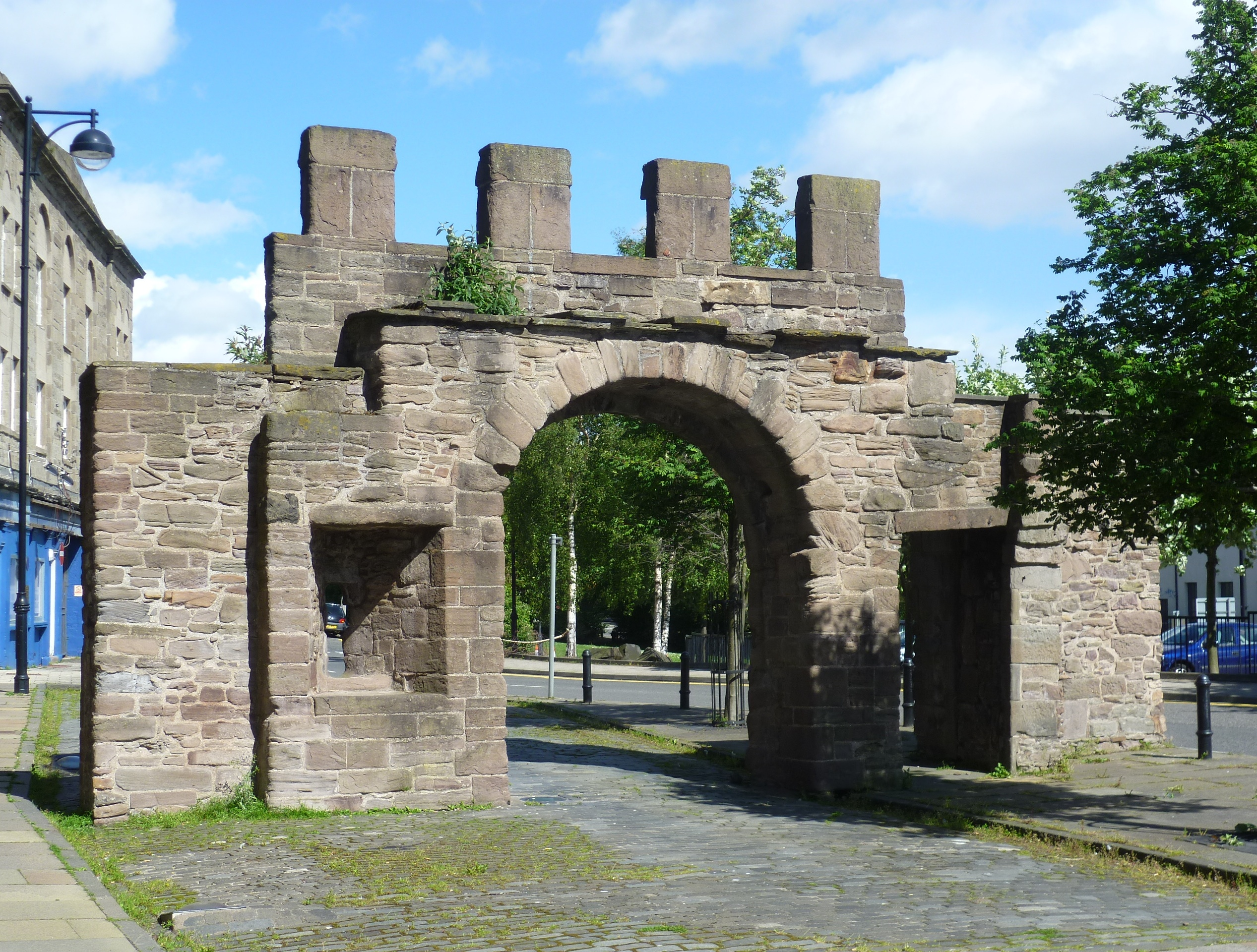
East Port, Dundee

By the end of August, Monck had captured Stirling, Alyth, and St Andrews. Dundee and Aberdeen were the last major towns not under English control. The strength of Dundee's fortifications meant many Scots had deposited money and valuables there, to keep them safe from the English. Monck drew up his full army outside the town on 26 August and demanded its surrender. The governor, believing the town walls and the local militia strong enough to withstand the English, refused. Infuriated at having to risk his men's lives with an assault when the war was all but over, Monck gave permission for the town to be sacked once it was captured. After a three-day bombardment the English stormed the west and east ports on 1 September. They broke into the town and thoroughly sacked it; several hundred civilians, including women and children, were killed. Monck admitted to 500, but the total may have been as high as 1,000. Monck allowed the army 24 hours to pillage and a large amount of booty was seized. Subsequently, strict military discipline was enforced. Shortly afterwards Aberdeen, whose council saw no benefit in resisting an inevitable and costly defeat, surrendered promptly when a party of Monck's cavalry arrived. The English army campaigned in the western Highlands to subdue the clans through early 1652, and three significant but isolated fortresses held out for a time. Brodick Castle surrendered on 6 April, and the Bass Rock fell a few days later. Dunnottar Castle, where the Honours of Scotland were being held, was the last major Scottish stronghold to surrender, on 24 May 1652, after the Honours had been smuggled out of the castle.

== Scottish invasion of England (1651) ==
Location of several places named in the text on a map of England

The army which Leslie and Charles II led into England in August 1651, despite being 12,000 strong, was desperately short of supplies and equipment. The lack of muskets meant many men were equipped with bows. The Scots marched rapidly south and were outside Carlisle by 8 August. The town refused Charles II entry (Note: Carlisle was in a position to refuse entry to the Scots as it possessed a garrison and was well fortified.) and the Scots marched further into England. Cromwell sent two forces, each of about 4,000 mounted men to harass the Scots and followed with his main force of 10,000 men. On 13 August the Parliamentarians attempted to hold the bridge at Warrington, but when the Scots attacked in force the English withdrew. Twenty-two days after leaving Stirling the Scottish army reached Worcester, having marched some 330 miles (530 km). The exhausted Scots paused in Worcester and hoped Royalist recruits would join them from Wales, the Welsh Marches and the West Country, but few did.

Charles II had hopes of a major Royalist uprising, but very few Englishmen joined the army, partly because they found the prospect of a renewed monarchy bound by the Covenant unedifying. Little military support existed for Charles II and this was rapidly suppressed by the Parliamentarians. A force of 1,500 from the Isle of Man gathered in Lancashire under the Earl of Derby and attempted to join the Royalist army, but they were intercepted at Wigan on 25 August by Parliamentarian troops and defeated. The largest single English contingent to join the army was only 60 strong. The English Council of State called up all the troops it could. Large musters took place at Northampton, Gloucester, Reading and Barnet. The London trained bands assembled 14,000 strong on 25 August and Fairfax secured Yorkshire. Parliamentarian forces concentrated around the Scottish army, where by the end of August Cromwell had 31,000 men against the 12,000 in the Scottish army.

=== Battle of Worcester ===
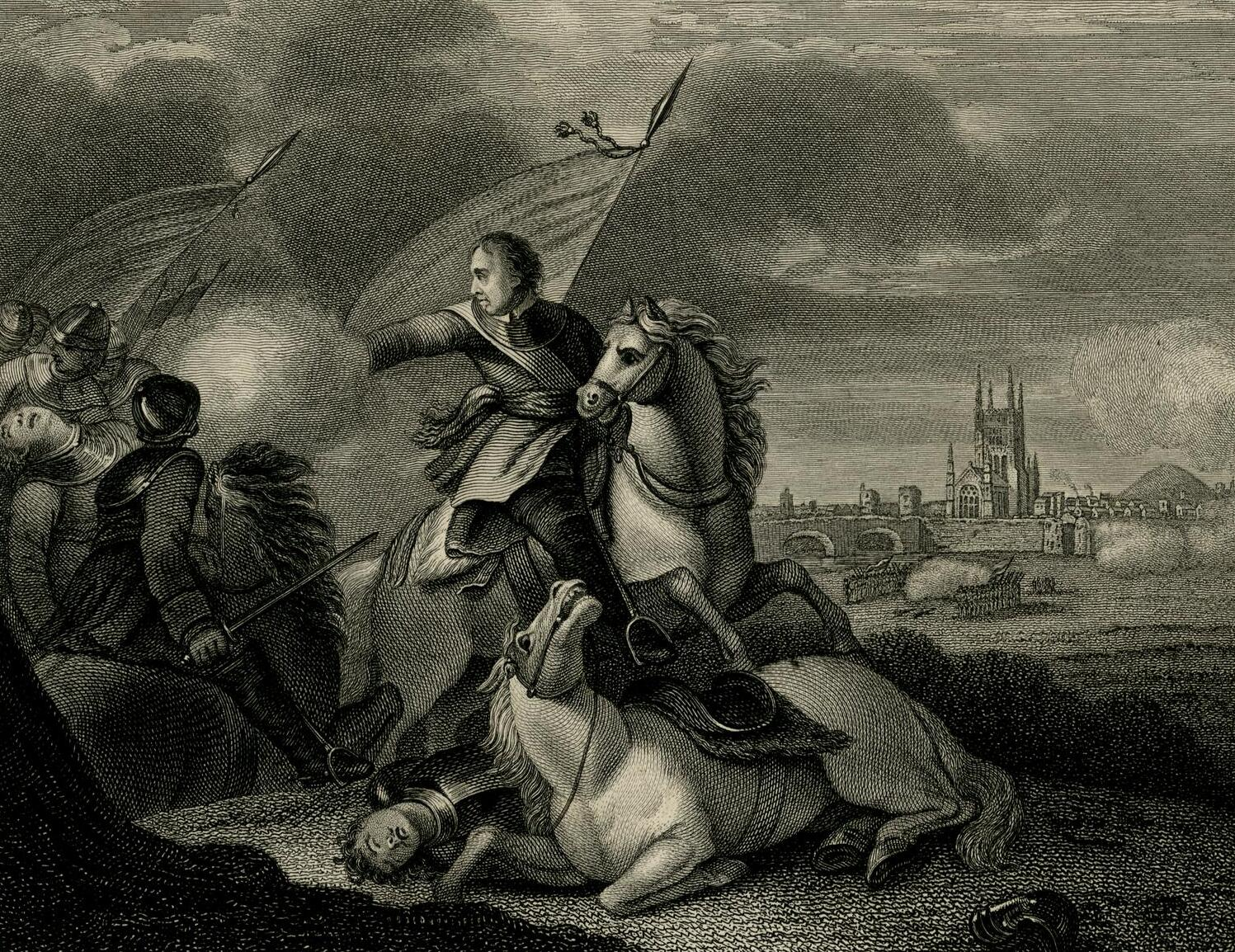
Battle of Worcester, by Machell Stace

The English not only far outnumbered the Scots, but were better trained, better equipped, better supplied and cut the Scots' line of retreat. Worcester was a naturally strong defensive position and was well fortified, and so Cromwell moved his forces into position deliberately. On 3 September 1651 he attacked from the south. The Scots attempted a desperate counter attack, but Cromwell moved his reserves to reinforce the threatened sector and the Scots were beaten back. The Parliamentarians broke into Worcester and captured it after fierce house-to-house fighting. The historian Barry Coward wrote "It was a divided enemy that Cromwell fought after Dunbar and decisively defeated at Worcester".

The defeated army lost more than 2,000 killed, and more than 6,000 Royalists were captured that day, nearly all Scots. The prisoners were either sent to work on drainage projects in the Fens or transported to North America to work as forced labour. Leslie, along with most of the Royalist commanders, was captured. (Note: Leslie was imprisoned in the Tower of London, and remained there until the restoration of the monarchy in 1660.) Charles II managed to escape to the continent. In the aftermath of the battle, Worcester was looted by the Parliamentarian army. Around 3,000 Scottish cavalry escaped northwards; en route back to Scotland they were harried by the English and most were captured or killed.

== Aftermath ==
The Battle of Worcester was the last significant pitched battle in the Wars of the Three Kingdoms. Before Worcester, the Commonwealth faced widespread international hostility evoked by the execution of Charles I. The victory strengthened their position, since it was clear the English people were willing to fight to defend the republic and capable of doing so effectively. The reliance of Charles II on a Scottish army in his attempts to regain the crown had cost him English support: Charles II realised he would need to win over the English if he wished to regain the throne. On arrival in France, he declared he would rather be hanged than ever to return to Scotland. (Note: True to his word, Charles II never set foot in Scotland again after his escape from Worcester.) The conquest of Scotland, and that of Ireland, won the Commonwealth respect among its continental neighbours: by early 1652 its legitimacy had been recognised by the French, Spanish, Dutch and Danes, and its navy had been able to assert its control over the Channel and Scilly Isles, as well as England's possessions in Barbados and North America. The threat of imminent Royalist invasion had been nullified.

The defeated Scottish government was dissolved, and the English Parliament absorbed the kingdom of Scotland into the Commonwealth. Military rule was imposed, with 10,000 English troops garrisoned across the country to quell the threat of local uprisings. Negotiations between commissioners of the English Parliament and the deputies of Scotland's shires and burghs began to formalise the incorporation of Scottish legal and political structures into the new British state. By 1653 two Scottish representatives were invited to take seats in the English Barebone's Parliament.

After in-fighting between factions in Parliament and the army, Cromwell ruled over the Commonwealth as Lord Protector from December 1653 until his death in September 1658. On Oliver Cromwell's death, his son Richard became Lord Protector, but the Army had little confidence in him. In May 1659, seven months after Oliver Cromwell's death, the Army removed Richard and re-installed the Rump; military force shortly dissolved this as well. General George Monck, by then commander-in-chief of the English forces in Scotland, marched south with his army, crossing the Tweed on 2 January 1660 and entering London on 3 February, where he called new parliamentary elections. These resulted in the Convention Parliament which on 8 May 1660 declared that Charles II had reigned as the lawful monarch since the execution of Charles I. Charles II returned from exile and was crowned King of England on 23 April 1661, (Note: He had been crowned King of Scotland ten years earlier on 1 January 1651 at Scone, the traditional place of coronation for Scottish monarchs.) completing the Restoration.

== See also ==
- Chronology of the Wars of the Three Kingdoms
- Timeline of the English Civil War

== Notes, citations and sources ==
=== Sources ===
- Ashley, Maurice (1954). Cromwell's Generals. London: Jonathan Cape. OCLC 557043110.
- Atkinson, Charles Francis (1911). "Great Rebellion" . In Chisholm, Hugh (ed.). Encyclopædia Britannica. Vol. 12 (11th ed.). Cambridge University Press. pp. 403–421.
- Atkin, Malcolm (2004). Worcestershire under Arms. Barnsley: Pen and Sword. ISBN 1-84415-072-0. OL 11908594M.
- Atkin, Malcolm (2008). Worcester 1651. Barnsley: Pen and Sword. ISBN 978-1-84415-080-9.
- Brooks, Richard (2005). Cassell's Battlefields of Britain and Ireland. London: Weidenfeld & Nicolson. ISBN 978-0-304-36333-9.
- Butler, James Davie (October 1896). "British Convicts Shipped to American Colonies". American Historical Review. 2 (1): 12–33. doi:10.2307/1833611. JSTOR 1833611.
- Coward, Barry (2003). The Stuart Age: England 1603–1714. Harlow: Pearson Education Ltd. ISBN 978-0-582-77251-9.
- Dow, F. D. (1979). Cromwellian Scotland 1651–1660. Edinburgh: John Donald Publishers Ltd. ISBN 978-0-85976-049-2.
- Edwards, Peter (2002). "Logistics and Supply". In John Kenyon & Jane Ohlmeyer (eds.). The Civil Wars: A Military History of England, Scotland and Ireland 1638–1660. Oxford: Oxford University Press. pp. 234–271. ISBN 978-0-19-280278-1.
- Furgol, Edward (2002). "The Civil Wars in Scotland". In John Kenyon & Jane Ohlmeyer (eds.). The Civil Wars: A Military History of England, Scotland and Ireland 1638–1660. Oxford: Oxford University Press. pp. 41–72. ISBN 978-0-19-280278-1.
- Gentles, Ian (2002). "The Civil Wars in England". In John Kenyon & Jane Ohlmeyer (eds.). The Civil Wars: A Military History of England, Scotland and Ireland 1638–1660. Oxford: Oxford University Press. pp. 103–154. ISBN 978-0-19-280278-1.
- Hutton, Ronald & Reeves, Wiley (2002). "Sieges and Fortifications". In John Kenyon & Jane Ohlmeyer (eds.). The Civil Wars: A Military History of England, Scotland and Ireland 1638–1660. Oxford: Oxford University Press. pp. 195–233. ISBN 978-0-19-280278-1.
- Keeble, N. H. (2002). The Restoration: England in the 1660s. Oxford: Blackwell. ISBN 978-0-631-19574-0.
- Kenyon, John & Ohlmeyer, Jane (2002). "The Background to the Civil Wars in the Stuart Kingdoms". In John Kenyon & Jane Ohlmeyer (eds.). The Civil Wars: A Military History of England, Scotland and Ireland 1638–1660. Oxford: Oxford University Press. pp. 3–40. ISBN 978-0-19-280278-1.
- Lodge, Richard (1969). The History of England – From the Restoration to the Death of William III (1660–1702). New York: Greenwood. OCLC 59117818.
- MacKenzie, Kirsteen (2009). "Oliver Cromwell and the Solemn League and Covenant of the Three Kingdoms". In Patrick Little (ed.). Oliver Cromwell: New Perspectives. Basingstoke: Palgrave Macmillan. ISBN 978-0-230-57421-2.
- Ohlmeyer, Jane (2002). "The Civil Wars in Ireland". In John Kenyon & Jane Ohlmeyer (eds.). The Civil Wars: A Military History of England, Scotland and Ireland 1638–1660. Oxford: Oxford University Press. pp. 73–102. ISBN 978-0-19-280278-1.
- Reese, Peter (2006). Cromwell's Masterstroke: The Battle of Dunbar 1650. Barnsley: Pen and Sword. ISBN 978-1-84415-179-0.
- Reid, Stuart (2008) [2004]. Dunbar 1650: Cromwell's Most Famous Victory. Oxford: Osprey Publishing. ISBN 978-1-84176-774-1.
- Rodwell, Warwick (2013). The Coronation Chair and Stone of Scone: History, Archaeology and Conservation. Oxford: Oxbow Books. ISBN 978-1-78297-153-5.
- Royle, Trevor (2005) [2004]. Civil War: The Wars of the Three Kingdoms, 1638–1660. London: Abacus. ISBN 978-0-349-11564-1.
- Sherwood, Roy Edward (1997). Oliver Cromwell: King In All But Name, 1653–1658. New York: St Martin's Press. ISBN 978-0-7509-1066-8.
- Stewart, Laura A. M. (2016). Rethinking the Scottish Revolution. Oxford: Oxford University Press. ISBN 978-0-19-871844-4.
- Stewart, Laura A. M. (2017). "Cromwell and the Scots". In Mills, Jane A. (ed.). Cromwell's Legacy. Manchester: Manchester University Press. pp. 171–190. ISBN 978-0-7190-8090-6.
- Wanklyn, Malcolm (2019). Parliament's Generals: Supreme Command and Politics During the British Wars 1642–51. Barnsley: Pen & Sword Military. ISBN 978-1-47389-836-3.
- Wheeler, James Scott (2002). The Irish and British Wars 1637–1654: Triumph, Tragedy and Failure. London: Routledge. ISBN 978-0-415-221320.
- Woolrych, Austin (2002). Britain in Revolution 1625–1660. Oxford: Oxford University Press. ISBN 978-0-19-820081-9.
- Young, John R. (1996). The Scottish Parliament 1649–1661: A Political and Constitutional Analysis. Edinburgh: John Donald Publishers. ISBN 978-0-85976-412-4.
