= Scottish invasion of England (1648) =

Scottish invasion of England in 1648
- Part of the Second English Civil War
Date	8 July – 24 August 1648
Location	North-west England
Result	English victory

Belligerents
Scotland; English Royalists	England

Commanders and leaders
Duke of Hamilton; Marmaduke Langdale	Oliver Cromwell; John Lambert

Strength
c. 24,000, not all of whom were engaged	11,200, of whom 9,000 were engaged

Casualties and losses
c. 2,000 killed; c. 11,000 captured	Fewer than 100 killed; Several hundred wounded

A Scottish invasion of England took place near Carlisle on 8 July 1648 as part of the Second English Civil War. The First English Civil War between Royalist supporters of Charles I and an alliance of Parliamentarian and Scottish forces had ended in 1646 with Charles defeated and imprisoned. He continued to negotiate with several factions among his opponents and this sparked the Second English Civil War in 1648. It began with a series of mutinies and Royalist uprisings in England and Wales. A Scottish faction which supported Charles, known as the Engagers, raised an army under the command of James Hamilton, Duke of Hamilton. This marched south to support the uprisings; crossing into England it combined with English Royalists under Marmaduke Langdale and continued along the west coast road some 24,000 strong. Much smaller Parliamentarian forces commanded by Major General John Lambert fell back in front of it.

Lieutenant General Oliver Cromwell concentrated 9,000 men in north Yorkshire on 12 August. They crossed the Pennines to fall on the flank of the much larger Royalist army at Preston on 17 August. Not contemplating that Cromwell would act so recklessly, Hamilton was caught with his army on the march and with large detachments too far away to intervene. A blocking force of about 3,000 English Royalist infantry, many ill-armed and inadequately trained, proved no match for the Parliamentarians, most of whom were well-trained veterans from the New Model Army. After a ferocious hour-long fight these Royalists broke and fled. A second round of prolonged infantry hand-to-hand fighting took place for control of a bridge over the River Ribble immediately south of Preston; the Parliamentarians were again victorious, fighting their way across as night fell.

Most of the survivors, nearly all Scottish, were to the south of Preston and had not been engaged. Although still at least as strong as the whole Parliamentarian army they fled towards Wigan in a night march. They were hotly pursued and on 19 August, hungry, cold, soaking wet, exhausted and short of dry powder turned to fight at Winwick. After more than three hours of furious but indecisive close-quarters fighting the Parliamentarians fell back. They carried out a flank march and when the Scots saw this force appear they routed. Parliamentarian cavalry pursued, killing many. All of the surviving Scots surrendered: their infantry either at Winwick church or in Warrington, their cavalry on 24 August at Uttoxeter. Winwick was the final battle of the war. In its aftermath Charles was beheaded on 30 January 1649 and England became a republic on 19 May.

== Sources ==
A map of England with modern county boundaries showing the locations of some of the places named in the text

=== Written ===
==== Campaign ====
There are five useful accounts of the short campaign. Oliver Cromwell, commander of the Parliamentarian army, wrote a series of long formal letters in the days after the battles, recounting events. They are considered to form, broadly, an accurate record and to be largely free of bias. The experienced soldier Marmaduke Langdale, commander of the English Royalists who bore the brunt of the fighting at Preston wrote an account shortly after the campaign: Impartial Relation. Several versions of this account exist, largely in agreement with each other, but with several discrepancies. John Hodgson, a captain in a Parliamentarian infantry regiment wrote his memoirs in 1683. Two partial accounts of the campaign were written by senior Scottish commanders in the 1670s.

==== Preston ====
There is a limited range of sources for the battle of Preston. There are no contemporary images nor illustrations of the battle other than two maps which concentrate on the layout of the town rather than the battle. There are three relatively full accounts of the battle written from a Royalist perspective. Langdale's account includes most aspects of the fighting at Preston. Another account was written by Edward Hyde, Earl of Clarendon, a senior Royalist politician, more than 30 years after the battle. His main source is Langdale, although he puts the fighting more in context, and pins most of the blame for the Royalist defeat on Scottish ineptitude. Letter from Holland was written by an English volunteer who served in the Scottish army, possibly in the bodyguard of Hamilton, the Scottish commander. The unnamed author evinces a considerable dislike for his Scottish allies.

There are two equivalent accounts from the Parliamentarian side: Cromwell's letters and Hodgson's memoirs. Two briefer accounts by participants of parts of the campaign or battle are the diary entries of Captain Samuel Birch and two pages in the memoirs of Major Edward Robinson. The Bloody Battle of Preston is an imaginative and bogus contemporary account with several demonstrably false statements.

==== Winwick ====
Cromwell was present at Winwick and his account includes the battle there. There is also a letter by the Parliamentarian cavalry officer Major John Sanderson giving details of his participation in the battle, and an account of it written by the Royalist James Heath in 1661.

=== Archaeology ===
Several small cannonballs have been recovered from the site of the battle of Winwick. These are housed at Warrington Museum and are probably from horse-portable frame guns. Historic England states that "Winwick is the only battlefield from the English Second Civil War which appears to survive in a good state of preservation", but none of the site has been formally excavated. Few archaeological finds tied to the battle of Preston have been recovered and there is little prospect of any more being unearthed as most of the areas around the town where fighting took place have since been built over.

== Background ==
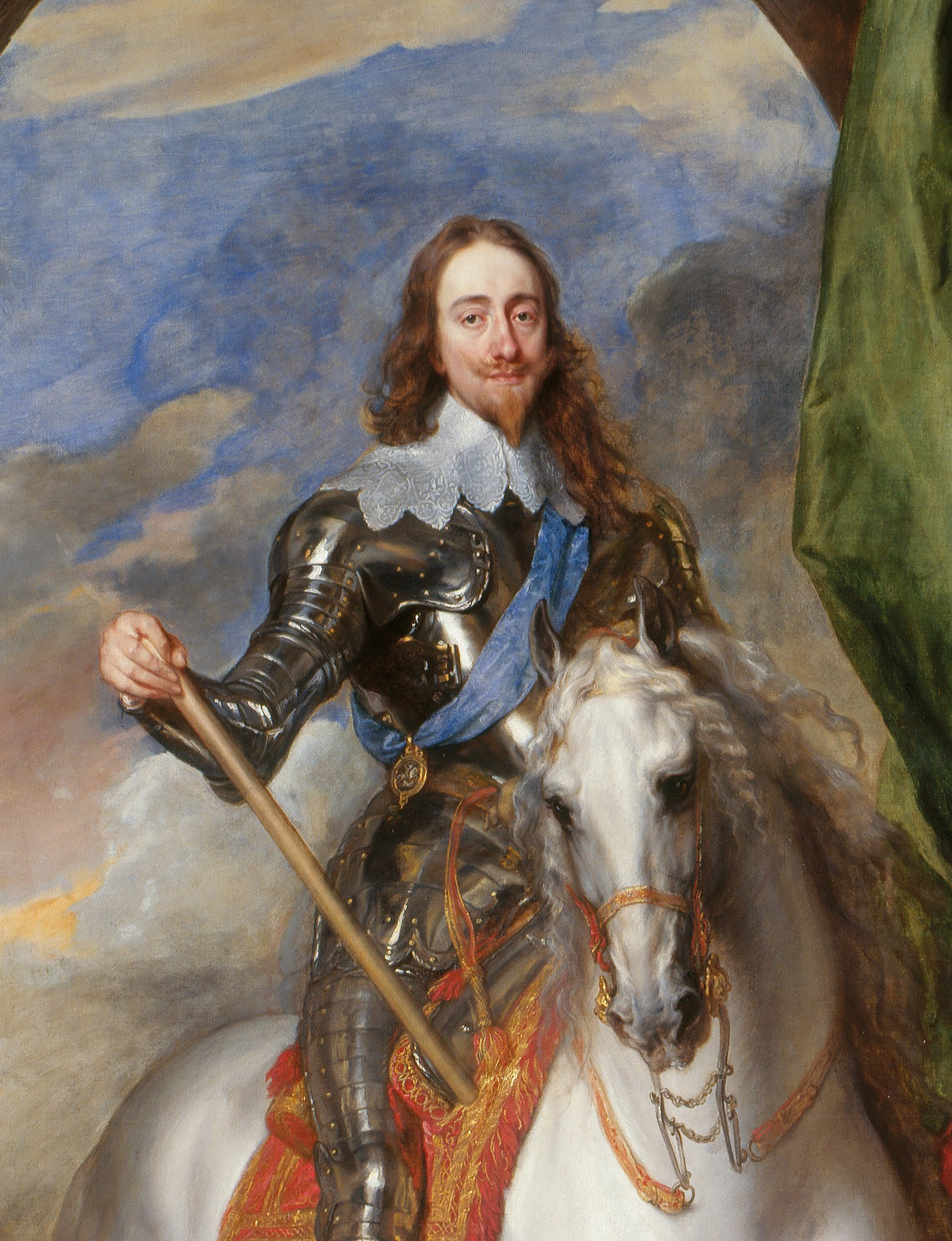
Charles I

In 1639, and again in 1640, Charles I, who was king of both Scotland and England in a personal union, went to war with his Scottish subjects in the Bishops' Wars. These had arisen from the Scots' refusal to accept Charles's attempts to reform the Scottish Kirk to bring it into line with English religious practices. Charles was not successful in these endeavours, and the ensuing settlement required all civil office-holders, parliamentarians and clerics to sign the National Covenant and give the Scottish Parliament the authority to approve all the king's councillors in Scotland. After years of rising tensions the relationship between Charles and his English Parliament broke down, starting the First English Civil War in 1642. In England Charles's supporters, the Royalists, were opposed by the combined forces of the Parliamentarians and the Scots. After four years of war the Royalists were defeated and Charles surrendered to the Scots. After nine months of fruitless negotiations with Charles the Scots handed him over to the English Parliamentary forces in exchange for a financial settlement and left England on 3 February 1647.

Charles then engaged in separate negotiations with different factions. In December 1647 he reached an agreement with the Scots, known as the Engagement, on religious matters, in return for their assistance in enforcing his claim to the English throne. The Engagement bitterly divided the Scots. The Kirk went so far as to issue a declaration condemning it as a breach of God's law. After a protracted political struggle the Engagers gained a majority in the Scottish Parliament and on 11 April 1648 repudiated the 1643 treaty with the Parliamentarians.

=== War ===
Oliver Cromwell

In 1648 the coalition of interests which had cohered on the Parliamentarian side during the first war fractured. There were risings in support of the Royalist cause in England and Wales and mutinies by Parliamentarian garrisons. These were especially serious in Kent, Essex and South Wales and marked the start of the Second English Civil War. On 29 April 1648 sixteen English Royalists seized the border town of Carlisle. By 1 May they had grown to a strength of 150 and had sent out patrols as far as Appleby. Six English warships defected to the Royalists. The most reliable military force the Parliamentarian leaders had at their disposal was the New Model Army. This was a standing army formed in 1645 by the Parliamentarians with an establishment of 22,000. It was a permanent and fully professional force, and commanded by Sir Thomas Fairfax it gained a formidable reputation during the last two years of the First English Civil War. It had been split into garrisons across the country.

Fairfax, based in London, put down the revolt in Kent on 1 June at the fiercely fought Battle of Maidstone. He then moved into Essex and began an eleven-week siege of Colchester. In South Wales the Parliamentarians faced mutinous garrisons in Chepstow, Tenby and Pembroke Castle as well as Royalist risings. Lieutenant General Oliver Cromwell arrived in South Wales on 11 May with 5,000 men of the New Model Army and found the local Parliamentarian forces gaining control. He besieged Pembroke Castle in the far south west on 31 May, hampered by a lack of artillery.

Major General John Lambert was in charge of Parliamentarian forces in the north of England. By mid-June he could muster fewer than 3,000 men; 1,700 from the Northern Association Army and 1,300 Lancashire militia. Marmaduke Langdale, who had fought as a cavalry commander in the First Civil War, raised 4,200 English Royalists in northern England. Pontefract Castle also went over to the Royalists, although the size of its garrison is uncertain. Lambert's men harassed the Royalist force around Carlisle, gathered information and besieged Pontefract Castle from early June. The summer of 1648 was extremely wet and stormy, causing both sides to be hampered by the weather.

The Scots raised an army under the command of the Duke of Hamilton to send into England to fight on behalf of Charles. As the situation with regards to the siege of Pembroke Castle and the restiveness of the local populace improved, Cromwell despatched regiments one at a time to march north and reinforce Lambert. Siege guns arrived on 1 July and the castle surrendered on the 11th. Cromwell mopped up and was marching east with more than 4,000 men within a week.

== Invasion ==
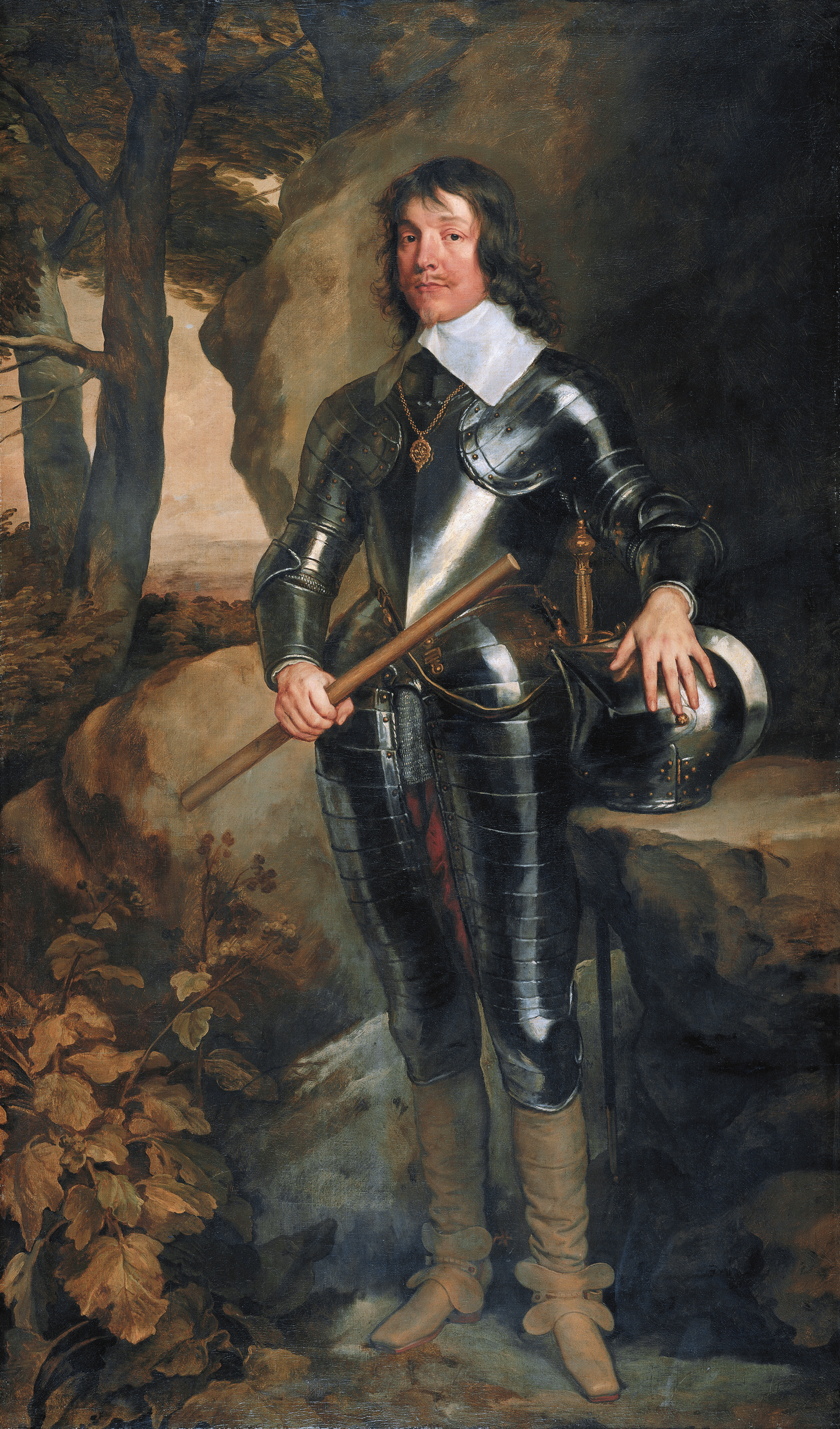
James Hamilton, Marquess of Hamilton

Hamilton crossed the border into England on 8 July and joined with Langdale's force at Carlisle on the 9th. Lambert's smaller parliamentarian force withdrew, concentrating around Barnard Castle, to the east of the Pennines. Over the following five weeks the Scots besieged and captured Appleby Castle, then moved south to Hornby, with Langdale's 4,000 men acting as an advance guard. Lambert, despite being steadily reinforced, acted on Cromwell's orders and stood on the defensive. The Scots had sent a force to Ulster in 1642 and this was recalled to join the invasion of England. It totalled round 2,800 – all of them experienced veterans. They were commanded by Major General George Munro, who refused to accept any subordination to Hamilton. This led to Munro's corps manoeuvring as an independent force.

Rather than take the shortest route to intercept the Royalist army, north along the west-coast road, Cromwell swung well to the east, reaching Leicester on 1 August. By this time many of the Parliamentarian infantry were barefoot and happy that 2,500 pairs of shoes were waiting for them. Prisoners from Wales were left in Nottingham and ammunition and recruits to bring the infantry regiments up to strength were available at Doncaster. On 2 August Lambert took his corps south and joined up with Cromwell and his accompanying infantry at Wetherby on 12 August. These infantry had marched 287 miles (462 kilometres) in thirteen days. Cromwell took command of the combined force.

On 13 August Cromwell directed his army westward, assuming or guessing that his opponent would continue south down the English west coast, rather than head directly for London via Upper Ribblesdale and Craven. It was not until the next day that a Royalist council of war agreed on the west-coast route. By 15 August Cromwell had decided to engage the Royalist army, despite it numbering more than twice as many men as that of the Parliamentarians. Langdale informed Hamilton that the combined Parliamentarian force was bearing down on their east flank, but this warning was largely disregarded. Hamilton and his senior advisors could not believe that Cromwell would carry out an extended forced march and then seek battle against a much larger force; as the modern historians Stephen Bull and Mike Seed put it "such impertinence and impetuosity was hardly credible". The historian Malcolm Wanklyn describes Cromwell's decision on the morning of 17 August, to force a battle while in ignorance of most of the Royalist positions as an enormous gamble.

On the morning of 17 August the Parliamentarian army was concentrated in the area of the Hodder bridge over the River Ribble, 12 miles (19 km) east of the road being taken by the Royalists. The Royalists had failed to concentrate their forces. Munro, with his 2,800 experienced soldiers, was at Kirkby Lonsdale, 30 miles (48 km) north of Preston. The bulk of the Scottish cavalry and their commander the Earl of Middleton were up to 16–20 miles (26–32 km) south of their infantry; the balance were closer to their main body. All the cavalry had dispersed to forage. These separations and the scattering of the cavalry were both militarily unwise. The Scottish infantry, the largest single contingent of the Scottish force, was just to the north of Preston. Langdale's corps of 4,000 men was 8 miles (13 km) north east of Preston and falling back ahead of the Parliamentarian advance scouts.

== Battle of Preston ==
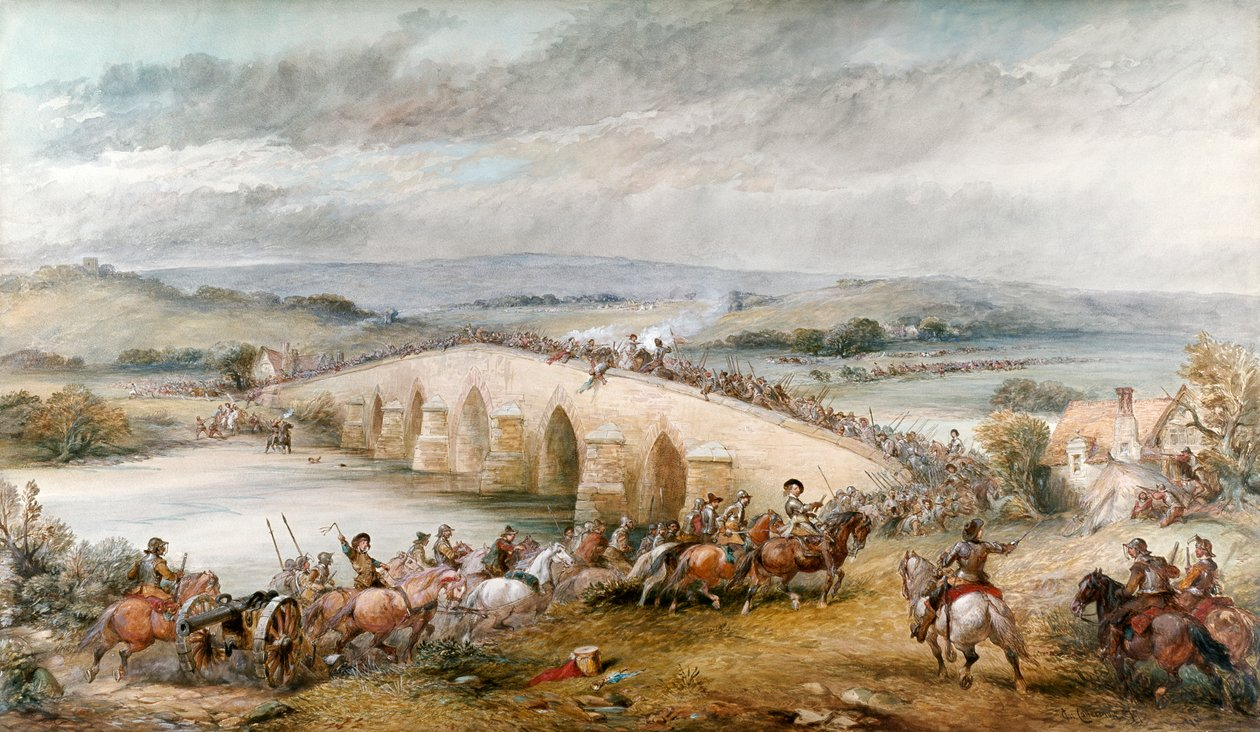
1877 impression of the fight for Preston Bridge

On the morning of 17 August Langdale again warned Hamilton as to the situation and was again ignored. Hamilton concentrated on passing the Scottish infantry over the Ribble bridge. Later that morning the Parliamentarian advance guard started pushing back Langdale's outlying troops in a confused running battle. Langdale had his main force take up defensive positions to the north west of Ribbleton Moor behind the deep cut of Eaves Brook, which runs east-west. This position halted the advance force of Parliamentarians a little before noon. The 8,000 or so Parliamentarians in the main body caught up and began deploying for battle, while skirmishing vigorously in heavy rain. When it was realised that Langdale had been correct in stating that a full Parliamentarian army was advancing – some time after noon – most of the Scottish infantry had already crossed the Ribble Bridge and were marching south.

In mid-afternoon Cromwell opened the battle proper with a fierce assault. For more than an hour the battle stalled on the line of hedgerows occupied by Langdale's infantry amidst fierce fighting, with the Parliamentarians suffering heavy casualties. Lambert ordered a fresh brigade forward on the Parliamentarian left wing and the Royalists broke and fled. The initial Parliamentarian break through coming on the Royalists' right cut most of them off from possible retreat to the Ribble Bridge. Many surrendered or were cut down. Others reached Preston, but the fight had gone out of them and the town was cleared by two regiments of Parliamentarian cavalry. The Royalist cavalry present retreated north towards Kirksby Lonsdale. Two regiments of Parliamentarian cavalry pursued them.

Parliamentarian musketeers took up positions on the escarpment north of the Ribble from which their fire could dominate the access to the bridge. Parliamentarian infantry then attempted to capture the bridge, but it took two hours of furious fighting before their pikemen were able to push their way across. Approximately 1,000 Royalists were dead and 4,000 captured by the end of the day. A Royalist council of war decided that the survivors, almost entirely composed of Scots, should immediately make their way south, to be well away from Cromwell's force by morning and to link up with their main force of cavalry at Wigan. To move as rapidly and stealthily as possible the Scots abandoned their baggage and ammunition trains, only taking with them what each man could carry.

=== Retreat ===
The abandoned baggage was discovered during the night, making it clear that the Scots had made off, relying on the dark and the heavy rain to mask their march. Cromwell was alerted: he pulled together a force of cavalry and sent them across the bridge onto the road south. Within 3 miles (5 km) they had closed with the few cavalry the Scots were using as a rear guard. The whole of the mounted contingent of the New Model Army – less the two cavalry regiments following Langdale, but reinforced by some Lancashire troops – was now in pursuit, some 2,500 cavalry and dragoons. Their advance guard harried the Scottish cavalry, determined to break through them to force the Royalist infantry to stand and fight. The Scottish cavalry under Middleton, recalled from Wigan, took up a position to hold off the Parliamentarian pursuit. Throughout 18 August the Parliamentarians pressed, so aggressively that in one skirmish the commander of the advance guard was killed. All of the infantry of the New Model Army was now following their mounted comrades, a further 2,900 men. Local militia had been left in charge of Preston and the prisoners.

By nightfall both sides were exhausted. The Scots entered Wigan, thoroughly plundered it and marched on through the night. Some men had not eaten nor slept for two nights, cavalrymen fell asleep in their saddles, the rain continued. Hungry, cold, soaking wet, exhausted and short of dry powder or matchlock the Scots continued south, leaving bands of stragglers and deserters behind them. Sanderson, who fought at Winwick, wrote of the roads, fields, woods and ditches being littered with the dead from Preston to Warrington.

== Battle of Winwick ==
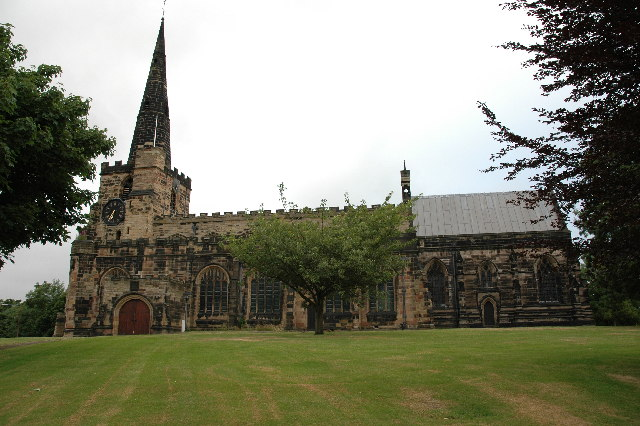
St Oswald's Church, Winwick

On 19 August, some 9 miles (14 km) south of Wigan, the Scots halted between the villages of Newton and Winwick at a naturally strong defensive position. The Scots numbered about 7,000 men, while the Parliamentarians were pursuing with nearly all of the New Model Army, supplemented by some local troops: approximately 2,500 cavalry and dragoons and 2,900 infantry for a total of 5,400–5,500 men. The Parliamentarian horses were exhausted and unable to manage more than a walk.

The Parliamentarian pursuers rode up the road and in the words of one of their number, Captain John Hodgson, the Scots "snaffled our forlorn [advance guard], and put them to retreat". Once Parliamentarian infantry arrived they attempted to storm the Scottish positions but were held up. Fierce fighting continued for several hours, with repeated Parliamentarian charges and prolonged close quarter fighting between the opposing pike formations. The Parliamentarian infantry were unable to dislodge the Scots and fell back. The Parliamentarian cavalry then pinned the Scots in place – who by now had run out of dry gunpowder – while their infantry took a circuitous route behind woods and in dead ground to emerge on the flank and rear of the Scots. The sight of the enemy emerging on their flank was too much for the exhausted Scots, who broke and fled. Many fled towards Winwick and the Parliamentarian cavalry followed, cutting down many. The Scots discarded their weapons and crammed into the village church, where they were taken prisoner. Seeing that the battle was lost, the Scottish cavalry withdrew in the direction of Warrington, 3 miles (5 km) to the south. The majority of the Scottish infantry, about 2,700 men, followed them, hard pressed by the Parliamentarians.

When this remnant of the Scottish infantry reached Warrington late on 19 August it discovered that their cavalry and Hamilton had abandoned them. Warrington bridge was barricaded and terms of surrender were sought. Cromwell took them prisoner, sparing their lives and their immediate personal possessions. Approximately 1,300 mounted Scots headed south. Discipline collapsed and troopers, even officers, deserted. Local militia repeatedly attacked. The weather continued to be wet and stormy. At Uttoxeter on 24 August a handful of the senior officers left, some of whom eventually made their way to safety. Hamilton was too sick to move and surrendered on terms to the still pursuing Parliamentarians: the prisoners were promised their lives and their clothes, they were not to be beaten, the sick and wounded would be treated locally and Hamilton was allowed six servants.

== Mopping up ==
After Winwick, Cromwell turned north. More than 1,100 Royalists commanded by Sir Philip Musgrave were trapped at Appleby and surrendered on generous terms. Munro withdrew his corps to Scotland with little fighting; from there it was ordered back to Ireland. Preston and Winwick were the last battles of the Second English Civil War. Colchester surrendered to Fairfax on 27 August 1648 and Pontefract held out until 22 March the following year.

=== Casualties ===
The number of casualties are difficult to calculate. Modern historians accept that approximately 1,000 Royalists were killed at Preston and 4,000 taken prisoner. During the retreat from Preston and at Winwick and its aftermath, approximately a further 1,000 Royalists are believed to have died and 7,000 to have been captured – contemporary estimates vary widely. Neither contemporary nor modern estimates agree on the total numbers. Those Scottish prisoners who had served voluntarily, as opposed to being conscripted, were sold as slaves: to work the land in the Americas or as galley slaves to Venice. Hamilton was beheaded for treason on 9 March 1649.

The English Parliament announced that their losses during the whole campaign had been 100 or fewer killed. Cromwell declined to quantify the loss, but did speak of "many" wounded. The Parliamentary figure of 100 dead is widely used by modern historians but Bull and Seed are sceptical and estimate that in excess of 500 were killed or wounded.

== Aftermath ==
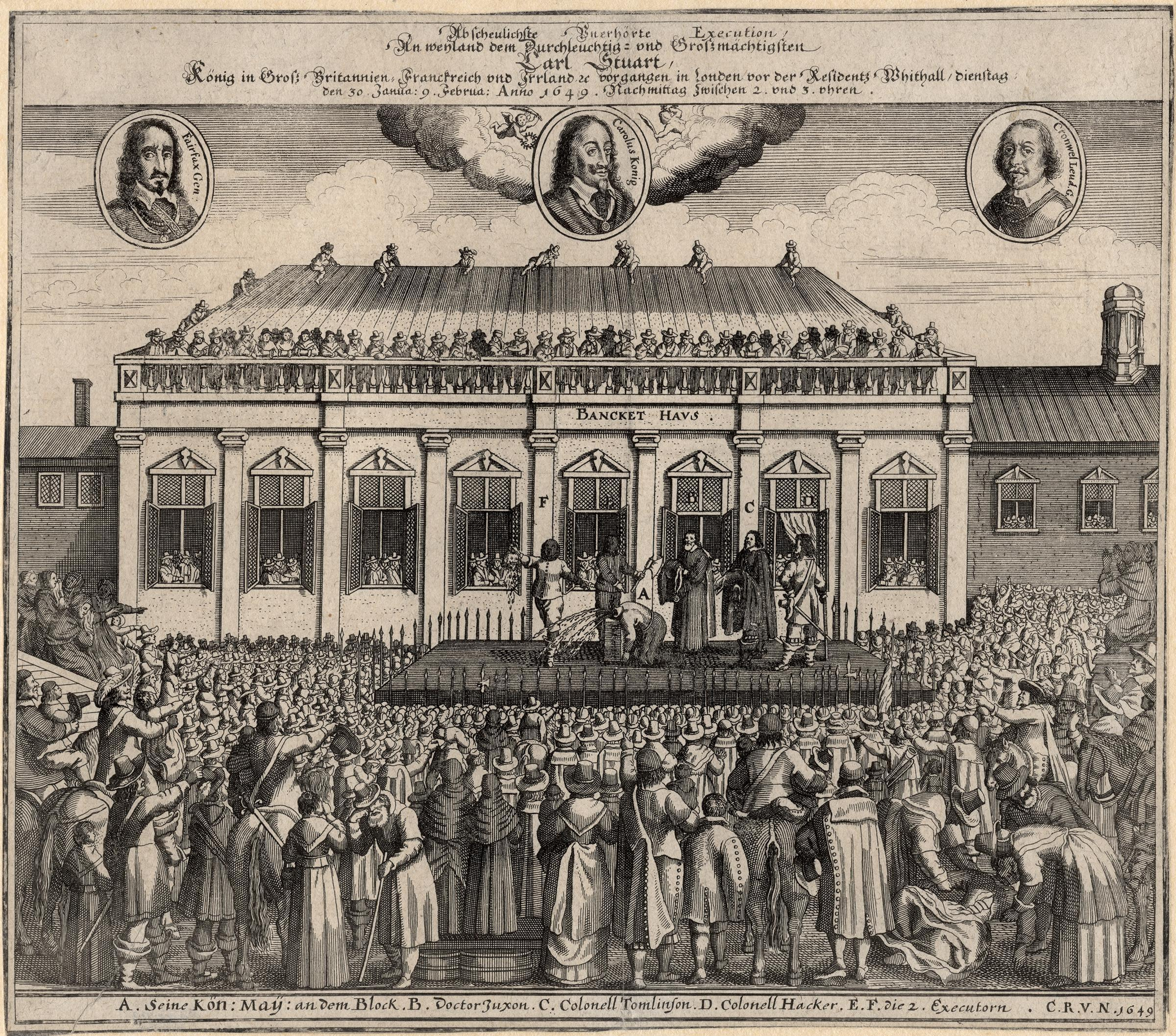
Contemporary German print of the execution of Charles I

The destruction of the Engager army led to further political upheaval in Scotland and the faction opposed to the Engagement was able to gain control of the government, with the assistance of a group of English Parliamentarian cavalry led by Cromwell. Exasperated by the duplicity of Charles I and by the English Parliament's refusal to stop negotiating with him and accept the demands of the New Model Army, the Army purged Parliament and established the Rump Parliament, which appointed a High Court of Justice to try Charles I for treason against the English people. He was convicted and on 30 January 1649 beheaded. On 19 May, with the establishment of the Commonwealth of England, the country became a republic.

The Scottish Parliament, which had not been consulted before the King's execution, declared his son Charles II, King of Britain and set about rapidly recruiting an army to support the new king. The leaders of the English Commonwealth felt threatened and the New Model Army, led by Cromwell, invaded Scotland on 22 July. After 14 months of hard fighting Scotland was largely subjugated and a Scottish counter-invasion was crushed at the battle of Worcester. The defeated Scottish government was dissolved and the English Parliament absorbed the kingdom of Scotland into the Commonwealth.

== Citations and sources ==
=== Sources ===
- Baker, Anthony (1986) [1986]. A Battlefield Atlas of the English Civil War. London: Promotional Reprint. ISBN 978-1-85648-334-6.
- Braddick, Michael (2009). God's Fury, England's Fire: A New History of the English Civil Wars. London: Penguin UK. ISBN 978-0-14-100897-4.
- Brooks, Richard (2005). Cassell's Battlefields of Britain and Ireland. London: Weidenfeld & Nicolson. ISBN 978-0-304-36333-9.
- Bull, Stephen & Seed, Mike (1998). Bloody Preston: The Battle of Preston, 1648. Lancaster: Carnegie. ISBN 978-1-85936-041-5.
- Dow, F. D. (1979). Cromwellian Scotland 1651–1660. Edinburgh: John Donald Publishers Ltd. ISBN 978-0-85976-049-2.
- Furgol, Edward (2002). "The Civil Wars in Scotland". In John Kenyon & Jane Ohlmeyer (eds.). The Civil Wars: A Military History of England, Scotland and Ireland 1638–1660. Oxford: Oxford University Press. pp. 41–72. ISBN 978-0-19-280278-1.
- Gaunt, Peter (1991). A Nation Under Siege: The Civil War in Wales, 1642-48. London: Cadw, Welsh Historic Monuments. ISBN 978-0-11-701222-6.
- Gentles, Ian (2002). "The Civil Wars in England". In John Kenyon & Jane Ohlmeyer (eds.). The Civil Wars: A Military History of England, Scotland and Ireland 1638–1660. Oxford: Oxford University Press. pp. 103–154. ISBN 978-0-19-280278-1.
- "Battle of Winwick (also known as Battle of Red Bank) 1648". Historic England. 2023.
- Kenyon, John & Ohlmeyer, Jane (2002). "The Background to the Civil Wars in the Stuart Kingdoms". In John Kenyon & Jane Ohlmeyer (eds.). The Civil Wars: A Military History of England, Scotland and Ireland 1638–1660. Oxford: Oxford University Press. pp. 3–40. ISBN 978-0-19-280278-1.
- MacKenzie, Kirsteen (2009). "Oliver Cromwell and the Solemn League and Covenant of the Three Kingdoms". In Patrick Little (ed.). Oliver Cromwell: New Perspectives. Basingstoke: Palgrave Macmillan. pp. 142–167. ISBN 978-0-230-57421-2.
- Reese, Peter (2006). Cromwell's Masterstroke: The Battle of Dunbar 1650. Barnsley: Pen & Sword Military. ISBN 978-1-84415-179-0.
- Royle, Trevor (2005) [2004]. Civil War: The Wars of the Three Kingdoms, 1638–1660. London: Abacus. ISBN 978-0-349-11564-1.
- Stewart, Laura A.M. (2016). Rethinking the Scottish Revolution. Oxford: Oxford University Press. ISBN 978-0-19-871844-4.
- Wanklyn, Malcolm (2014) [2006]. Decisive Battles of the English Civil War. Barnsley, South Yorkshire: Pen & Sword. ISBN 978-1-78346-975-8.
- Woolrych, Austin (2002). Britain in Revolution 1625–1660. Oxford: Oxford University Press. ISBN 978-0-19-820081-9.
- Young, John R. (1996). The Scottish Parliament 1649–1661: A Political and Constitutional Analysis. Edinburgh: John Donald Publishers. ISBN 978-0-85976-412-4.
