= Stuart Reid (Scottish historical writer) =

Military historian

Stuart Reid (born 1954, Aberdeen, Scotland) is a writer, analyst and former soldier. A writer on, mainly, military history, his 2007 book The Secret War for Texas won the 2008 Summerfield G. Roberts Award awarded by the Sons of the Republic of Texas.

== Selected works ==
- Killiecrankie, 1689: First Jacobite Rising (Partizan Press, 1989)
- King George's Army, 1740-93, Vol. 2 (Osprey, 1995)
- All the King's Armies: a military history of the English Civil War (1998)
- Scots Armies of the English Civil War (Osprey, 1999)
- Wellington's Army in the Peninsula 1809-14 (Osprey, 2004)
- Dunbar 1650: Cromwell's Most Famous Victory (Osprey, 2004)
- Quebec 1759 : the battle that won Canada. Oxford: Osprey. 2003. ISBN 1855326051.
- Redcoat officer : 1740-1815. Oxford, U.K.: Osprey Pub. 2002. ISBN 1841763799.
- King George's Army 1740-93. London: Osprey. 1995. ISBN 1855325659.
- Queen Victoria's Highlanders. London: Bloomsbury Publishing Plc. 2011. ISBN 978-1-78096-246-7.
- Battles of the Scottish Lowlands (Battlefield Britain)
- Cumberland's Culloden Army 1745-46 (Osprey, 2012)
- Crown Covenant and Cromwell: The Civil Wars in Scotland 1639 - 1651 (Frontline Books, 2012)
- Sheriffmuir 1715 (Frontline Books, 2014)
- The Battle of Minden 1759 (Frontline Books, 2016)
