= John Philipps Kenyon =

English historian (1927–1996)

John Philipps Kenyon FBA
- Born: 18 June 1927; Sheffield, England, UK
- Died: 6 January 1996 (aged 68); Norwich, England, UK
- Occupations: Historian and academic

Academic background
- Education: King Edward VII School
- Alma mater: University of Sheffield; Christ's College, Cambridge
- Doctoral advisor: John H. Plumb

Academic work
- Discipline: History
- Sub-discipline: Early modern Britain; Political history
- Institutions: Christ's College, Cambridge; University of Hull; University of St Andrews; University of Kansas

John Philipps Kenyon, FBA (18 June 1927 – 6 January 1996) was an English historian and Fellow of the British Academy. His area of expertise was 17th-century England.

== Life ==
Kenyon was born in Sheffield where he attended King Edward VII School, Sheffield and then University of Sheffield where he obtained a first class degree in History in 1948 before going to Cambridge to take a doctorate as a pupil of John H. Plumb. He obtained his doctorate in 1954 and was appointed a fellow of Christ's College, Cambridge, before going on to become Hull's history professor for 19 years, followed by six years at St Andrews. From 1987 to 1994 he was Distinguished Professor of early modern British history at the University of Kansas. For many years he was a regular reviewer for The Observer.

== Works ==
- Robert Spencer, Earl of Sunderland (1958)
- The Stuarts (1958)
- The Stuart Constitution, 1603-1688 (1966)
- The Popish Plot (1973)
- Revolution Principles: The Politics of Party 1689-1720 (1977)
- Stuart England (1978)
- The History Men (1983)
- The Civil Wars of England (1988)
