= Austin Woolrych =

English historian (1918–2004)

Professor Austin Herbert Woolrych FBA FRSA

Pro Vice-Chancellor of the University of Lancaster
- In office 1971–1975

Personal details
- Born: 18 May 1918 Marylebone, London, UK
- Died: 15 September 2004 (aged 86)
- Spouse: Muriel Edith Rolfe (m. 1941; died 1991)

Academic background
- Education: Royal Military College, Sandhurst; Pembroke College, Oxford (BA BLitt)

Academic work
- Discipline: Historian
- Institutions: University of Leeds (1949–64); University of Lancaster (1964–83)
- Main interests: English Civil War
- Notable works: Britain in Revolution (2002)
- Military career
- Allegiance: United Kingdom
- Branch: British Army
- Service years: 1938–1945
- Rank: Captain
- Units: Inns of Court Regiment; Royal Tank Regiment
- Conflicts: El Alamein (1941)

Austin Herbert Woolrych FBA FRSA (18 May 1918 – 15 September 2004) was an English historian, a specialist in the period of the English Civil War.

== Early life and education ==
Austin Woolrych was born in Marylebone, London, the son of Stanley Herbert Cunliffe Woolrych and May Gertrude Woolrych, née Wood. His father was a distinguished British Army intelligence officer during the First World War who became a businessman. Woolrych was descended from an old Shropshire gentry family, and was related to Sir Thomas Wolryche, 1st Baronet, Royalist governor of Bridgnorth during the English Civil War.

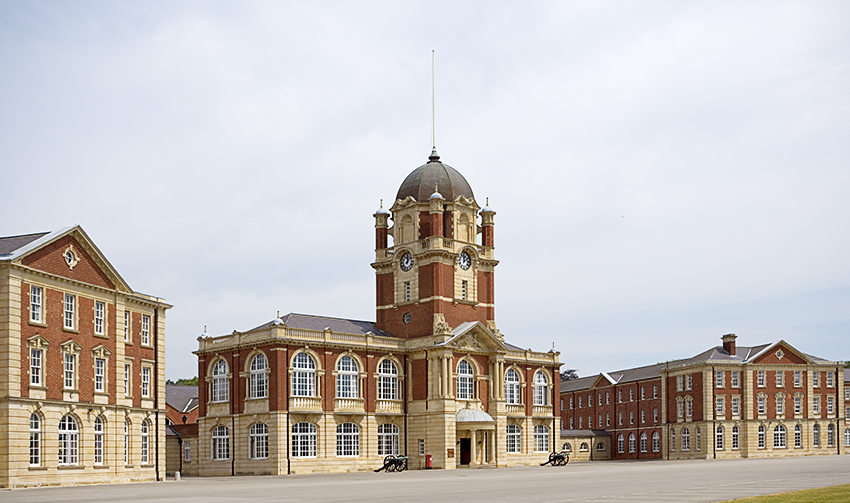
Royal Military College, Sandhurst

Woolrych was educated at Westminster School, but owing to the family's financial distress during the Great Depression he did not proceed to university. Instead, he left school in 1934, aged 16, and became a clerk at Harrods.

In 1938, he joined the Inns of Court Regiment of the Territorial Army. On the outbreak of the Second World War he was sent to Royal Military College, Sandhurst, and commissioned into the Royal Tank Regiment. He was blinded in one eye at the Battle of El Alamein in 1941.

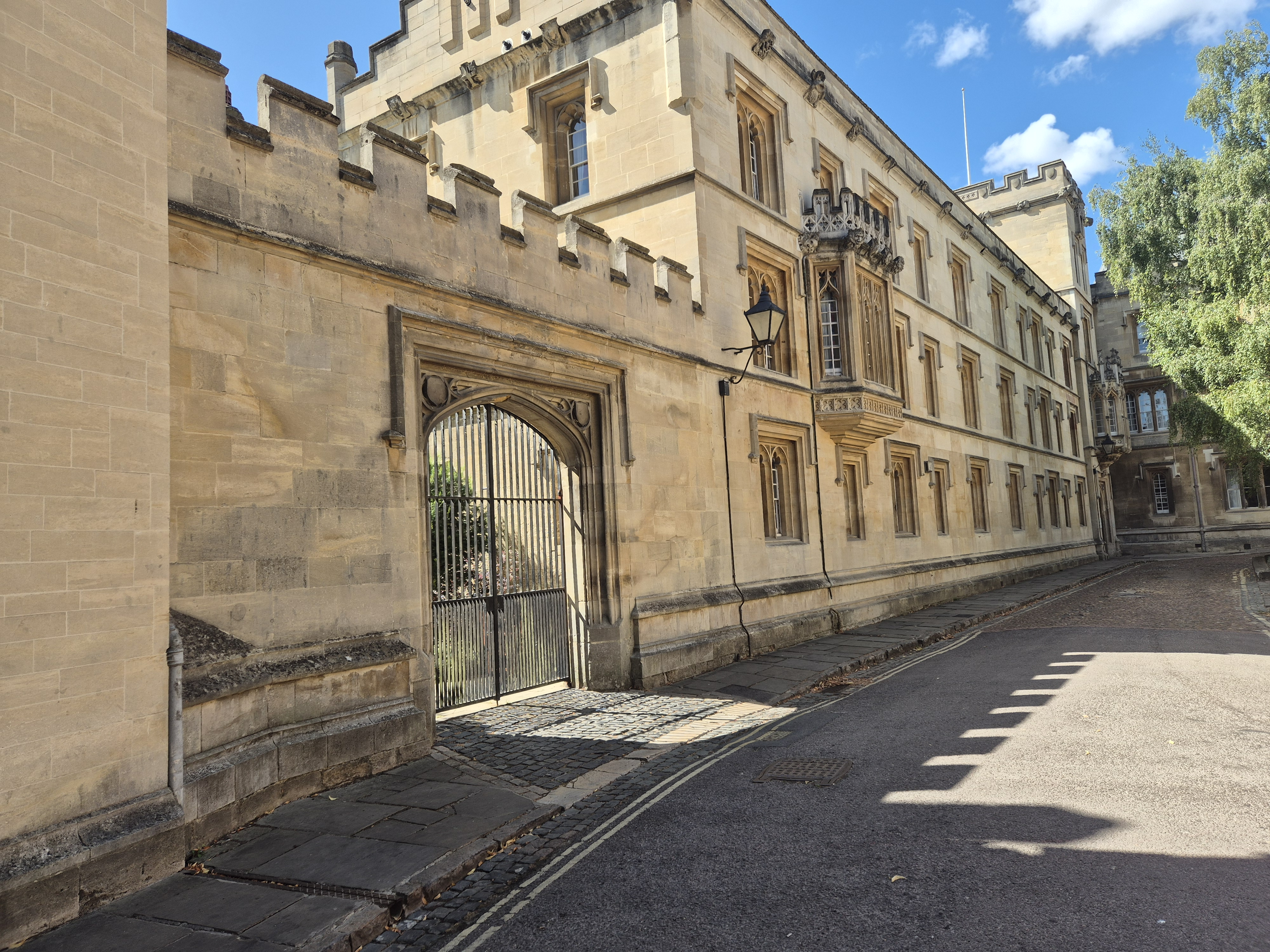
Pembroke College, Oxford

After the war, Woolrych was decommissioned with the rank of Captain, and attended Pembroke College, Oxford on an ex-serviceman's educational grant; he originally planned to read English, but owing to the college's lack of a tutor read History instead. He graduated from Oxford with a BA (first-class honours) and a BLitt.

== Academic career ==
Lancaster University

Woolrych joined the History Department at the University of Leeds in 1949. He remained there until 1964 when he became Professor of History at the newly founded University of Lancaster. From 1971 to 1975 he was Pro-Vice-Chancellor of the University of Lancaster. From 1981 to 1982 he was Visiting Fellow of All Souls College, Oxford.

He retired in 1983. Freed from administrative work and teaching, he published several major works in retirement.

== Honours ==
Woolrych was elected a Fellow of the British Academy (FBA) in 1988.

== Marriage and children ==
Woolrych married Muriel Edith Rolfe in 1941; she died in 1991. They had one son and one daughter.

== Select publications ==
- Woolrych, A.H. (1964), Oliver Cromwell, Oxford: Oxford University Press, ISBN 978-0198315377
- Woolrych, A.H. (1966), Battles of the English Civil War (New ed.), London: Pimlico, ISBN 978-0712650434
- Woolrych, A.H. (1981), Commonwealth to Protectorate, Oxford: Clarendon Press, ISBN 978-0198226598
- Woolrych, A.H. (1983), England Without a King 1649–60, Lancaster Pamphlets, London: Routledge, ISBN 9780415104562
- Woolrych, A.H. (1987), Soldiers and Statesmen: The General Council of the Army and Its Debates, 1647–1648, Oxford: Oxford University Press, ISBN 978-0198227526
- Woolrych, A.H.; Firth, C.H. (1999), The Clarke Papers: Selections from the Papers of William Clarke - Secretary to the Council of the Army, 1647–49, and to General Monck and the Commanders of the Army in Scotland, 1651–60, London: Royal Historical Society, ISBN 978-0861931330
- Woolrych, A.H. (2002), Britain in Revolution: 1625–1660, Oxford: Oxford University Press, ISBN 978-0199272686

Academic offices
Preceded by	Pro Vice-Chancellor of the University of Lancaster; 1971–1975	Succeeded by
