= Laura A. M. Stewart =

British historian

Laura A. M. Stewart, FRHistS, FSA Scot, is a Scottish historian specialising in early modern British history, especially Scottish political culture, Anglo-Scottish relations and the Civil War. She is Professor in Early Modern History at the University of York.

== Career ==
Stewart completed a Master of Arts degree at the University of St Andrews before moving to the University of Edinburgh to complete a Master of Science degree by research; she stayed there to carry out doctoral studies, and her PhD was awarded in 2003 for her thesis "Politics and religion in Edinburgh, 1617–53". She was a British Academy postdoctoral fellow from 2005 to 2007, and spent ten years teaching at Birkbeck, University of London, before moving to the University of York in 2016, and being made Professor in Early Modern History at York in 2018. She is a Fellow of the Royal Historical Society and of the Society of Antiquaries of Scotland. Her book Rethinking the Scottish Revolution (2016) won the American Historical Association's Morris D. Forkosch Prize in 2017 and was shortlisted for the Longman–History Today Awards in the same year.

Stewart's research focuses on early modern British history, especially Scottish political culture, Anglo-Scottish relations and the Civil War.

== Publications ==
- Urban Politics and the British Civil Wars: Edinburgh, 1617–1653 (Brill, 2006).
- Rethinking the Scottish Revolution: Covenanted Scotland, 1637–1651 (Oxford University Press, 2016).
- (Co-author with Janay Nugent) Union and Revolution: Scotland and Beyond, 1625–1745, The New History of Scotland series (Edinburgh University Press, 2021).
