= Battle of Preston (1648) =

Battle of the Second English Civil War

- Part of the Second English Civil War
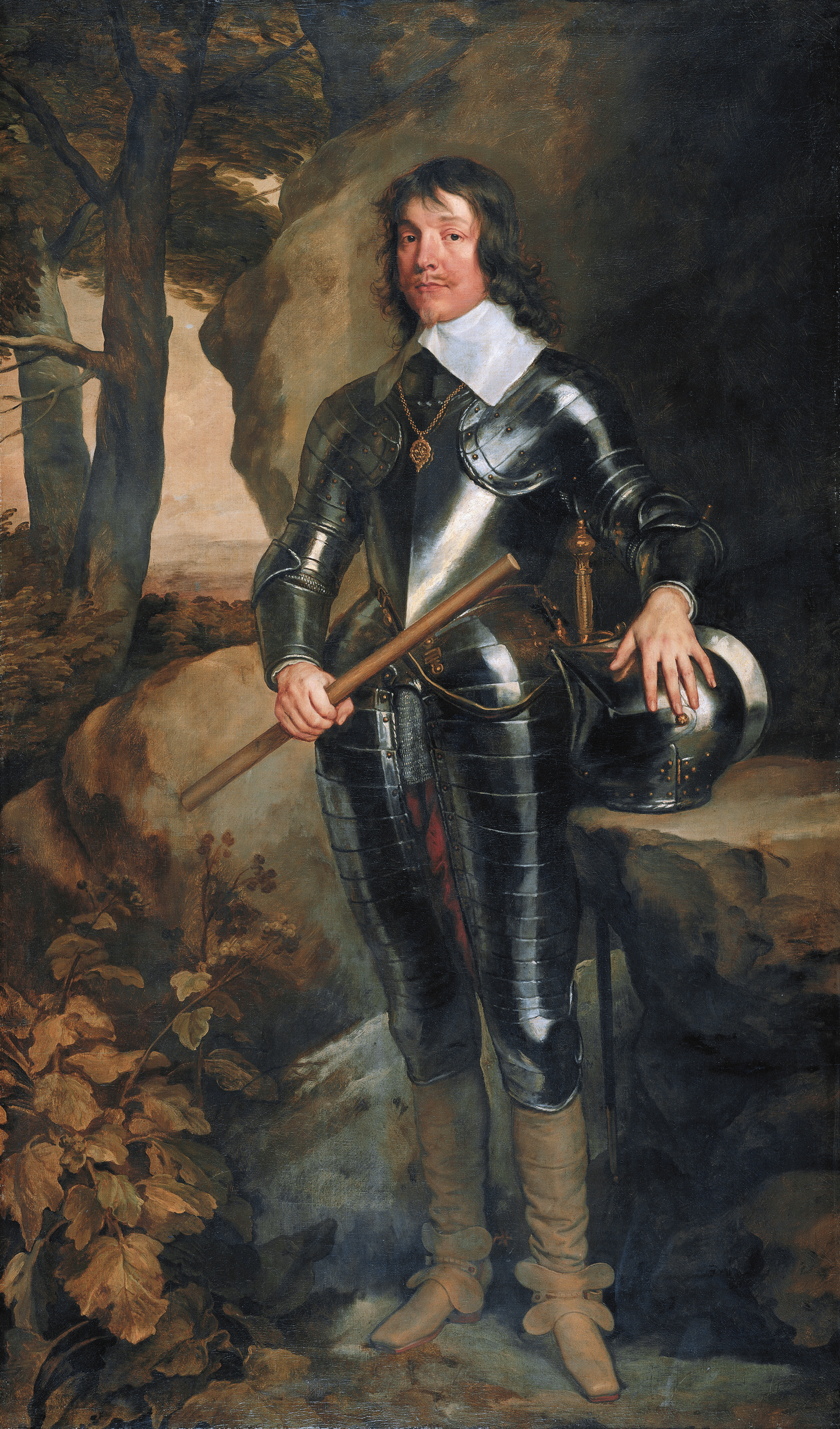
- James Hamilton, commander of the invading Scottish army
| Date | 17 August 1648 |
| Location | Preston, Lancashire 53°45′10″N 2°40′46″W |
| Result | Parliamentarian victory |

Belligerents
| Scotland; English Royalists | English Parliamentarians |

Commanders and leaders
| Duke of Hamilton; Marmaduke Langdale | Oliver Cromwell; John Lambert |

Strength
| c. 24,000, not all of whom were engaged | 11,100, of whom 9,000 were engaged |

Casualties and losses
| c. 1,000 killed; c. 4,000 captured | Fewer than 100 killed; Several hundred wounded |
- Location of the battle in Lancashire, showing modern administrative boundaries

The battle of Preston was fought on 17 August 1648 during the Second English Civil War. A Parliamentarian army commanded by Lieutenant General Oliver Cromwell attacked a considerably larger force of Royalists under James Hamilton, Duke of Hamilton, near the Lancashire town of Preston; the Royalists were defeated with heavy losses.

The First English Civil War between Royalist supporters of Charles I and an alliance of Parliamentarian and Scottish forces ended in 1646 with Charles defeated and imprisoned. He continued to negotiate with several factions among his opponents and this sparked the Second English Civil War in 1648. It began with a series of mutinies and Royalist uprisings in England and Wales. Meanwhile, a political struggle in Scotland led to a faction which supported Charles, known as the Engagers, gaining power. The Scots raised an army which crossed into England at Carlisle on 8 July to support the uprisings. Combining with English Royalists they marched south along the west coast road some 24,000 strong. Much smaller Parliamentarian forces fell back in front of them. Cromwell was suppressing uprisings in south Wales with 5,000 men during May and June; he captured the last Royalist stronghold on 11 July and was marching east within a week.

Cromwell concentrated 9,000 men in north Yorkshire and crossed the Pennines to fall on the flank of the much larger Royalist army at Preston. Not contemplating that Cromwell would act so recklessly, Hamilton was caught with his army on the march and with large detachments too far away to intervene. A blocking force of about 3,000 English Royalist infantry, many ill-armed and inadequately trained, proved no match for the Parliamentarians, most of whom were well-trained veterans from the New Model Army. After a ferocious hour-long fight these Royalists were outflanked on both sides, which caused them to break. The largest part of the Royalist army, predominately Scottish, was marching south immediately to the rear of this fighting. Most had crossed a bridge over the Ribble, a major river just south of Preston; those still to the north of it were swept away by the Parliamentarian cavalry and either killed or taken prisoner. A second round of prolonged infantry hand-to-hand fighting took place for control of the bridge; the Parliamentarians were again victorious, fighting their way across as night fell.

Most of the survivors, nearly all Scottish, were to the south of Preston. Although still at least as strong as the whole Parliamentarian army they fled towards Wigan in a night march. They were hotly pursued and on 19 August were caught and defeated again at the battle of Winwick. Most of the surviving Scots surrendered: their infantry either at Winwick or nearby Warrington, their cavalry on 24 August at Uttoxeter. In the aftermath of the war Charles was beheaded on 30 January 1649 and England became a republic on 19 May.

== Background ==
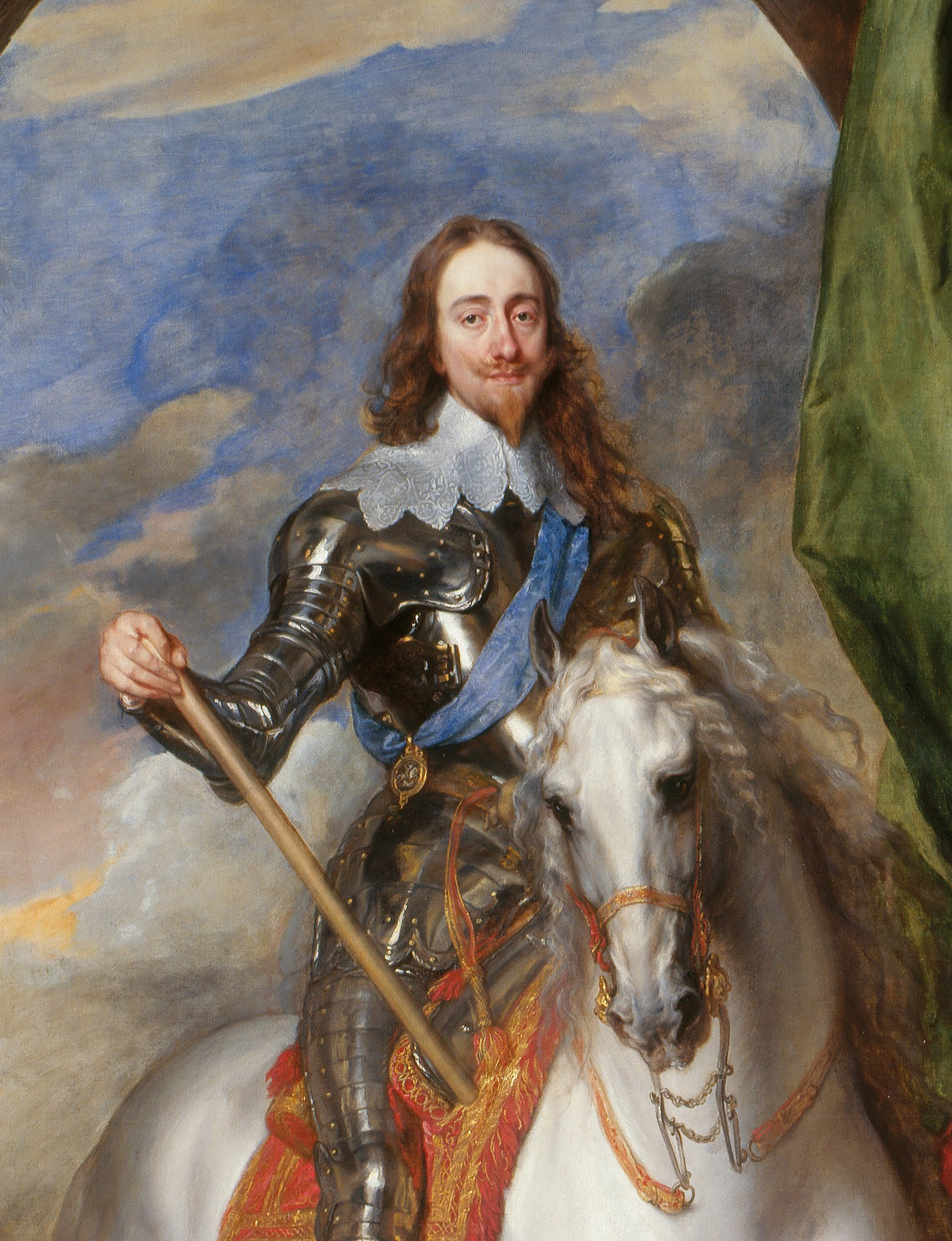
Charles I

Charles I, king of Scotland and England in a personal union, went to war with his Scottish subjects in the Bishops' Wars of 1639 and 1640. Charles was unsuccessful and the settlement with his Scottish Parliament in 1641 severely limited his powers. After years of rising tensions the relationship between Charles and his English Parliament also broke down, starting the First English Civil War in 1642. In England, Charles's supporters, the Royalists, were opposed by the combined forces of the Parliamentarians and the Scots. In 1643 the latter pair formed an alliance bound by the Solemn League and Covenant. After four years of war the Royalists were defeated and Charles surrendered to the Scots on 5 May 1646. The Scots agreed with the English Parliament on a peace settlement which the Scots spent months trying to persuade Charles to agree to, but he refused. The Scots eventually handed Charles over to the English Parliamentary forces on 3 February 1647 in exchange for a financial settlement and left England.

Charles engaged in separate negotiations with different factions, eventually signing an agreement known as the Engagement, which had been thrashed out with the Scottish delegation, on 26 December 1647. Charles agreed to confirm the Solemn League and Covenant by act of parliament in both kingdoms in return for the Scots' assistance in enforcing his claim to the English throne. When the Scottish delegation returned to Edinburgh with the Engagement, the Scots were bitterly divided on whether to ratify its terms. After a protracted political struggle those in favour of it, known as the Engagers, gained a majority in the Scottish Parliament and on 11 April 1648 repudiated the 1643 treaty with the Parliamentarians.

== War ==
Oliver Cromwell

The coalition of interests on the Parliamentarian side during the first war fractured in 1647. In early 1648 there were uprisings in support of the Royalist cause in England and Wales and mutinies by Parliamentarian garrisons, marking the start of the Second English Civil War. The most reliable military force the Parliamentarian leaders had at their disposal was the New Model Army. (Note: The New Model Army was a standing army formed in 1645 by the Parliamentarians with an establishment of 22,000. It was a permanent and fully professional force, and commanded by Thomas Fairfax it gained a formidable reputation during the last two years of the First English Civil War.) This had been split into garrisons across the country; its commander, Sir Thomas Fairfax, based in London, put down the revolt in Kent on 1 June, then moved into Essex and began an eleven-week siege of Colchester. In south Wales the Parliamentarians faced mutinous garrisons in Chepstow, Tenby and Pembroke Castle as well as Royalist uprisings.

The Scots raised an army under the command of the Duke of Hamilton to send into England to fight on behalf of the King. With rebellion breaking out in England and Wales and the Scottish army marching for the border, the future of Britain hung in the balance, in the view of the modern historian Ian Gentles. The summer of 1648 was extremely wet and stormy, hampering both sides. Major General John Lambert was in charge of Parliamentarian forces in the north of England and his men harassed the Royalist force around Carlisle, gathered information and besieged Pontefract Castle from early June. Marmaduke Langdale, who had fought as a cavalry commander in the First Civil War, raised 4,000 English Royalists in northern England and covered the arrival of Hamilton's army.

When Lieutenant General Oliver Cromwell arrived in south Wales on 11 May with 5,000 men of the New Model Army, he found the local Parliamentarian forces regaining control. Cromwell undertook the Siege of Pembroke castle in the far south west on 31 May, hampered by a lack of artillery. As the siege progressed and the restiveness of the local populace declined, Cromwell despatched cavalry regiments one at a time to march north and reinforce Lambert. Siege guns arrived on 1 July and the castle, the last Royalist stronghold in South Wales, surrendered on 11 July. Cromwell mopped up and his infantry was marching within a week. Rather than moving directly towards the Scottish army they left Wales at Gloucester and then headed north east through Warwick and Leicester before turning north towards Yorkshire. Cromwell did this to place his force on the direct route from Carlisle to London and to ensure as far as he could that he would be able to combine with Lambert's detachment.

== Invasion ==
A map of England with modern county boundaries showing the locations of some of the places named in the text

Hamilton crossed into England on 8 July and joined Langdale's force at Carlisle the next day. After some fierce skirmishing around Appleby, Lambert's smaller Parliamentarian force withdrew, concentrating around Barnard Castle, to the east of the Pennines. Over the following three weeks the Scots besieged and captured Appleby Castle, giving the impression that they planned to move into Yorkshire. They then moved south to Hornby, with Langdale's 4,000 men acting as an advance guard and pushing as far as Settle by 9 August, suggesting that they would continue south to the west of the Pennines. Lambert, despite being steadily reinforced, acted on Cromwell's orders and stood on the defensive; the historian Peter Reese describes his performance during this period as brilliant. On 2 August he took his corps south and joined with Cromwell and his accompanying infantry at Wetherby on 12 August. These infantry had marched 287 miles (462 kilometres) in thirteen days. Cromwell took command of the combined force.

The Scots had sent a force to Ulster in 1642 to intervene in the Irish Confederate Wars. It was recalled to join the invasion of England. Some of the vessels ferrying the men of this corps back to Scotland were intercepted by the Parliamentarian navy; 300 men of one regiment are known to have been captured. How many mustered for the invasion is unclear but it was probably around 2,800 – all of them experienced fighting men. Their effectiveness was reduced because their commander, Major General George Munro, refused to accept any subordination to Hamilton. This led to Munro's corps manoeuvring as an independent force and being well to the north of Hamilton's main army when the Parliamentarians attacked.

On 13 August, Cromwell directed his army westward, leaving his artillery at Wetherby to enable his army to advance more rapidly. He assumed that his opponent would continue south down the English west coast, rather than head directly for London via Upper Ribblesdale and Craven. It was not until the next day that a Royalist council of war agreed on the west coast route. By 15 August, Cromwell had decided to engage the Royalist army, despite it numbering more than twice as many men as that of the Parliamentarians; the modern historians, Stephen Bull and Mike Seed, describe this as daring. Langdale's scouts passed information to him about the Parliamentarian dispositions and he informed Hamilton that the combined Parliamentarian force was bearing down on their east flank but this warning was disregarded. Hamilton and his senior advisors could not believe that Cromwell would carry out an extended forced march and then seek battle against a much larger force; as Bull and Seed put it "such impertinence and impetuosity was hardly credible". The historian, Malcolm Wanklyn, describes Cromwell's decision on the morning of 17 August, to force a battle while in ignorance of most of the Royalist positions as an enormous gamble.

== Opposing forces ==
=== Infantry ===
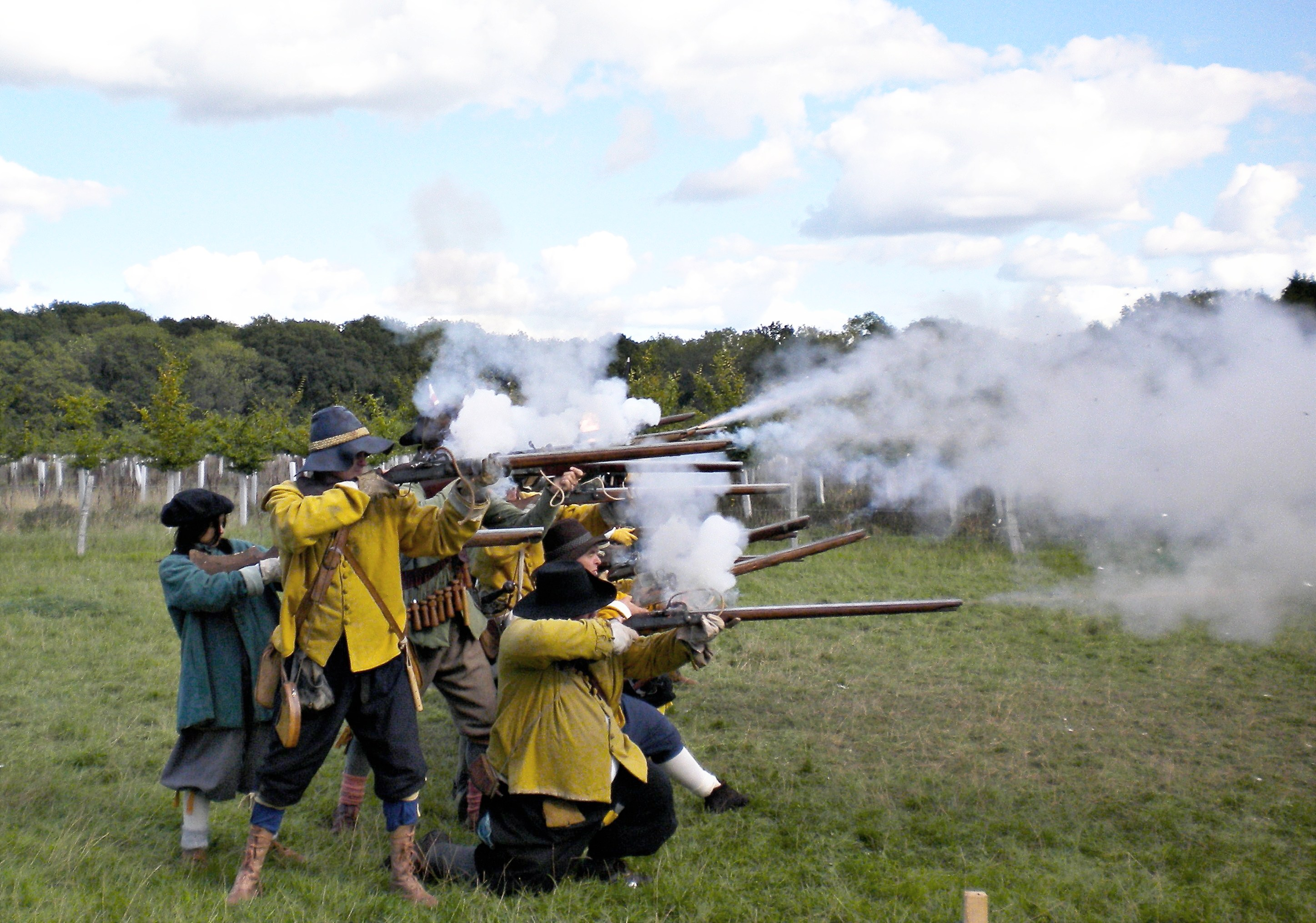
A modern re-enactment of a musket volley of the period

Infantry formations, equipment and tactics were similar in the armies. The basic tactical formation was the regiment, which varied greatly in size. An infantry regiment was usually made up of 10 companies and typically had a nominal strength of 800 or 1,000 men that was rarely met. Each was composed of musketeers and pikemen.

Musketeers were armed with muskets possessing 4-foot-long (1.2 m) barrels and, mostly, matchlock firing mechanisms. These relied on the glowing end of a length of slow match, thin cord soaked in saltpetre, igniting the weapon's priming powder when the trigger was pulled. Keeping the slow match burning resulted in the consumption of a vast amount but dowsing it rendered the musket useless. Balancing combat readiness against logistical capability called for fine judgement from a regiment's officers. These muskets were reliable and robust weapons, but their effectiveness was severely reduced in poor weather. Persistent rain during the battle of Preston may account for the frequent contemporary references to hand-to-hand fighting and the use of pikes. A few musketeers on each side were equipped with the more reliable flintlock muskets. In 1648 musket tactics were changing from firing one rank at a time so as to maintain a steady fire, to the entire unit discharging a volley for shock effect. A well-trained musketeer took approximately 40 seconds to reload and would carry ten rounds of ammunition.

Pikemen were equipped with pikes: long wooden shafts tipped with steel points. Pikes as issued were normally 18 feet (5.5 m) long, but on the march they were commonly cut down to a more wieldy 15 feet (4.6 m) or so. The pikemen carried basic swords and typically wore steel helmets but no other armour; in some regiments a few pikemen, usually those in the front rank, would have also worn body armour. Military manuals of the time suggested a ratio of two musketeers per pikeman but in practice commanders usually attempted to maximise the number of musketeers and a higher ratio was the rule. (Note: The Parliamentarian New Model Army was formed in 1645 with three musketeers for each pikeman. By 1650 some Royalist regiments had dispensed with pikemen altogether, although this was not the case with any of those at Preston.)

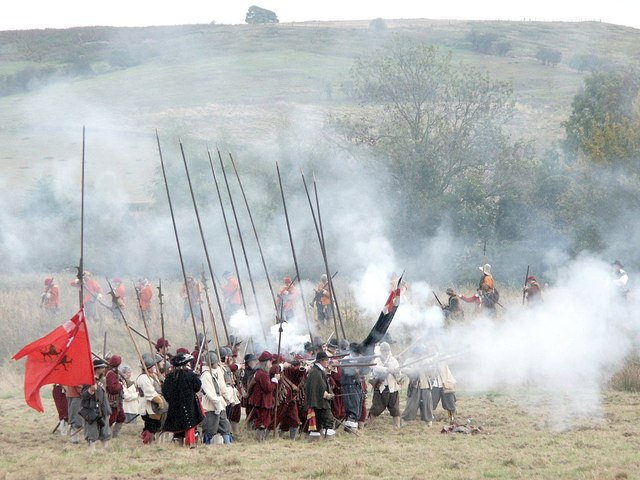
Civil War reenactors

Both armies organised their infantry regiments into brigades of three regiments each, which doctrine suggested be deployed two regiments abreast, with the third behind as a reserve. The men in each unit would form four or five ranks and in a relatively loose formation, with about 1 metre (3.3 ft) of frontage per file; so an infantry regiment of 600 might form 120 men wide and 5 deep, giving it a frontage of 120 metres (390 ft) and a depth of 5 metres (16 ft). The pikemen would be placed in the centre of a formation, in a "stand", with the musketeers on each side. The usual tactic against infantry was for the musketeers to fire on their opponents and once it was thought they had been sufficiently weakened or demoralised the stand of pikemen would advance, attempting to break through the enemy centre. This was known as a "push of the pike". The musketeers would also advance, engaging the enemy with their musket butts, which were steel-plated for this purpose and attempt to envelop the opposing formation. (Note: Bayonets were not used by British infantry until the 1660s.)

Against cavalry, doctrine called for infantry units to tighten the spacing between their files to approximately 45 centimetres (18 in) per man and to advance steadily. To be effective against infantry, the cavalry needed to break into their formation, and if the men were too close together, this was not possible. It was accepted that so long as the morale of the infantry held, cavalry could do little against the front of such a formation. The flanks and rear were increasingly vulnerable when the infantry packed more closely together, as this made manoeuvring or turning the unit more difficult.

=== Cavalry ===
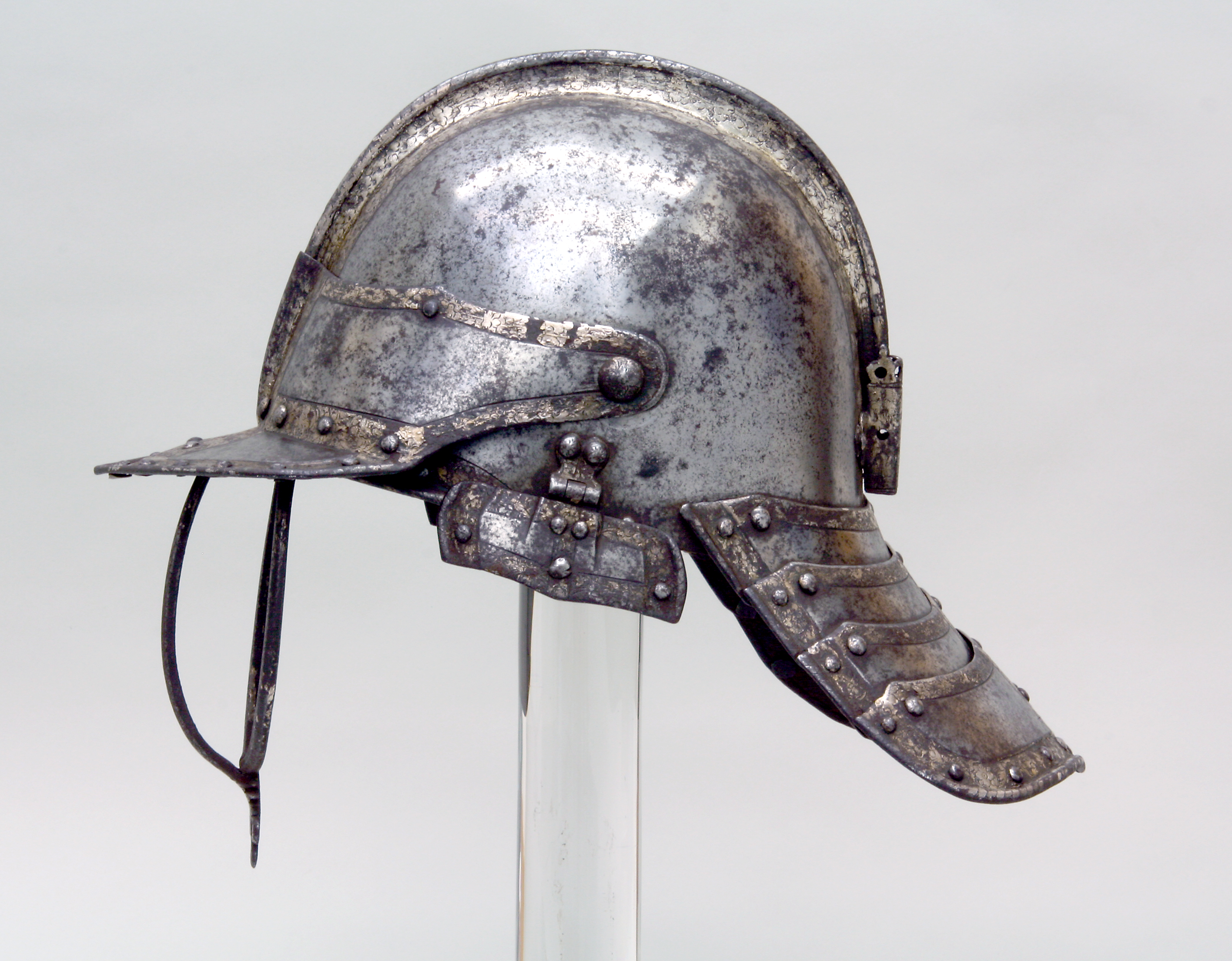
An English lobster-tailed pot helmet c. 1630–1640, with neck protection (the "lobster tail"), three-barred face protection, a peak and a longitudinal comb on the skull; the hinged cheekpieces are missing

Most of the Parliamentarian cavalry were mounted on large horses (for the time). The cavalrymen all wore metal lobster-tailed pot helmets which protected the head and, usually, the neck, cheeks and, to an extent, face; and thigh-length boots. Body armour was worn by most cavalry and consisted of a cuirass – metal chest and back plates – although many relied on just a jacket of thick uncured leather. They were each armed with two pistols and a sword, the pistols were 18 inches (46 cm) to 24 inches (61 cm) long and had a very limited effective range. Most cavalry pistols had flintlock firing mechanisms, which were more reliable in damp or windy weather than matchlock mechanisms. Flintlocks were more expensive than matchlocks and were usually reserved for the cavalry, who found igniting and using the slow match while controlling a horse inconvenient. The swords were straight, 3-foot-long (90 cm) and effective at cutting and thrusting.

The Royalist cavalry were similarly equipped, with helmets, pistols, swords and body armour, although many of the Scots bore lances rather than pistols. Scottish horses were smaller and lighter than their English equivalents; this gave them greater manoeuvrability but put them at a disadvantage in a face-to-face confrontation. The Scottish cavalry were well mounted, but many were inexperienced and ill-disciplined. Parliamentarian cavalry tactics were intended to use their strengths. They adopted a tight formation, with their riders' legs interlocked, and to maintain it would advance no faster than a trot. They would discharge their pistols at very short range and upon coming into contact attempt to use the sheer weight of their mounts and the mass of their formation to force back their opponents and burst through their ranks. Royalist cavalry were more likely to charge at a faster pace and in a looser formation.

Both armies contained dragoons. These had originated as mounted infantry, using horses to increase their operational mobility and dismounting to fight with pikes or muskets. By 1648 they had largely become specialist mounted troops; none carried pikes. The Parliamentarian dragoons were exchanging their muskets for carbines (shorter-barrelled versions of muskets, more wieldy for carrying on, or even firing from, horseback) or occasionally, pistols. Scottish dragoons were also partway through this change and carried matchlock muskets and cavalry swords. Dragoons usually acted as scouts or formed a rearguard.

=== Artillery ===
The Parliamentarian forces involved in the battle possessed no artillery, having left it at Wetherby. The Royalist army's artillery train was with Munro's corps, and so took no part in the battle. Several Scottish infantry regiments had lightweight, small-calibre cannon to supplement the fire of their musketeers, for a total of about 20 pieces. These small pieces were particularly effective against cavalry.

=== Numbers ===
According to Bull and Seed, the force from the New Model Army commanded by Cromwell consisted of about 2,900 infantry and 2,300 cavalry. The Northern Association Army under Lambert added some 800 infantry and 900–1,000 cavalry. The numbers of Lancashire Militia available are less certain but have been estimated at 1,600 infantry and 500 cavalry. This gives an estimated Parliamentarian strength at Preston of about 9,000 men, 5,300 infantry and 3,700 cavalry. Further forces totalling around 2,100 infantry were within two days' march of Preston on the day of battle and some were involved in the post-battle mopping up. Wanklyn broadly agrees, estimating that Cromwell had 8,000–9,000 men available to him as a field force; Richard Brooks follows Cromwell's figures and specifies 8,600. Most of these men were seasoned troops, well trained and experienced, and the militia were to match the veterans when the fighting started.

The main Scottish army under Hamilton is difficult to enumerate as nearly all the Scottish units were under strength, some seriously so; it contained about 12,000 infantry and 3,500 cavalry, not all of whom took part in the battle. The force under Munro is even less clear, but it probably consisted of about 1,800 infantry and 1,000 cavalry, none of whom fought at Preston. The English Royalist component under Langdale and Philip Musgrave added perhaps 4,500 infantry and 1,200 cavalry, many ill-armed and inadequately trained. This gave a total of roughly 24,000 men available to Hamilton: 18,300 infantry and 5,700 cavalry. Though many of the Scots were experienced soldiers, they were unenthusiastic about another round of warfare and there had been difficulty raising troops. Some regiments had barely half their establishment and more than half were recruits, lacking experience and training. A contemporary exaggerated that "not a fifth man could handle a pike".

== Battle ==
=== Closing to contact ===
A sketch of troop positions as the fighting started

On the morning of 17 August, the Parliamentarian army was largely concentrated in the area of the Hodder bridge over the River Ribble, 12 miles (19 km) east of Preston and the road being taken by the Royalists. The Royalists had failed to concentrate their forces. Munro's corps and the Scottish artillery were at Kirkby Lonsdale, 30 miles (48 km) north of Preston, waiting for an ammunition train expected from Scotland, before following on. The bulk of the Scottish cavalry and their commander the Earl of Middleton were up to 16–20 miles (26–32 km) south of their infantry; the balance were closer to their main body. All of the cavalry had dispersed to forage. The separation of Munro's men and the scattering of the cavalry were militarily unwise.

The Scottish infantry, the largest contingent of the Royalist force, was just to the north of Preston. Most of Langdale's corps, perhaps 4,000 men, were 8 miles (13 km) north east of Preston, falling back ahead of the Parliamentarian vanguard. On 17 August Hamilton intended to get the whole of his army across the bridge over the Ribble immediately south of Preston and on the march to Wigan and then Manchester. Before the first unit had crossed, Langdale rode up to inform him that the whole of Cromwell's force was advancing from the north east and was already engaging his command. Hamilton dismissed this report as Langdale exaggerating another probe by Lambert; he ordered the infantry to commence crossing the bridge, but sent a small unit of Scottish cavalry to assist Langdale. These cavalry were equipped with lances and so were not well suited to the small fields and close terrain in which they were deployed.

The Parliamentarian advance guard, of either 600 or 900 men, was pushing back Langdale's outlying troops in a confused running battle. (Note: Given as 600 men by Wanklyn or 900 – 200 infantry, 500 cavalry and 200 dragoons – by Bull and Seed.) Langdale had about 3,000 infantry and 700 cavalry in the vicinity of Preston, although there is no record of his cavalry being engaged in any fighting on 17 August. All or most of his infantry took up defensive positions about 4 miles (6 km) north west of Preston. His infantry occupied a good defensive position immediately south west of Ribbleton Moor with their skirmishers protected in part by a deeply cut brook to their front. The line ran north west to south east with the main force behind hedges. The road the Parliamentarians were advancing along ran at a right angle through the centre of the Royalist line. This position halted the advance force of Parliamentarians a little before noon. The 7,000 or so Parliamentarians in their main body caught up and began deploying for battle, while skirmishing vigorously in heavy rain. As the pressure from the Parliamentarian army built, the Royalist skirmishers fell back to join the main line. Langdale's aim was to force the Parliamentarian army to spend several hours deploying into battle formation and so allow the Scots to his rear to reinforce him. Langdale stretched his line as far as the number of troops would permit, about three-quarters of a mile (1 km) to avoid being outflanked. His defensive position was thin and had little depth. The terrain was boggy and broken up by many hedges, even the roads and tracks were difficult going. Cromwell complained that the area was completely unsuitable for cavalry.

=== Langdale's stand ===
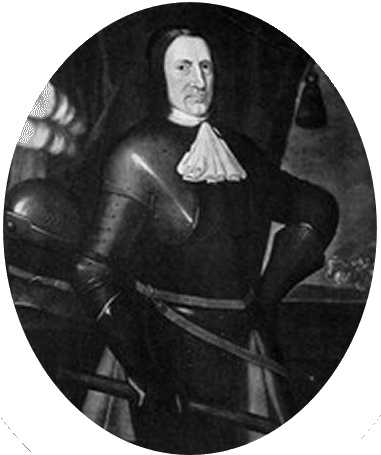
Marmaduke Langdale

The nearest part of the main contingent of the Royalist army was 1 mile (1.6 km) to the west of Langdale's corps. Hamilton could hear the increasing volume of musket and pistol fire, but still believed that Langdale's force was only facing a strong probe and ordered the Scottish infantry to continue crossing the Ribble. In the early afternoon Cromwell opened the battle proper by charging the cavalry of the advance guard down the road, hoping to split Langdale's line. The road was blocked just behind the front line by a force of pikemen who halted the Parliamentarian charge, the by-passed musketeers on either side of the road fired into the sides of the stalled cavalry formation. The Scottish lancers were committed and they threw the Parliamentarians back. All five infantry regiments of the New Model Army present were deployed in the front line, with three regiments attacking to the right of the road and two to the left. They comprised about 3,500 men in total.

Two fresh cavalry regiments attempted to position themselves for another rush along the road, but they found the going difficult as the road was jammed with wounded horses; they were driven back by musket fire. For over an hour the battle stalled on the line of hedgerows occupied by Langdale's infantry amidst fierce fighting, the Parliamentarians suffering heavy casualties. In his account of this part of the battle Cromwell described the Royalists as putting up "a very stiff and sturdy resistance". The fighting in the hedgerow-enclosed fields frequently came down to a "push of pike". The New Model Army infantry were accustomed to fighting in close terrain, but the inexperienced Royalist musketeers frequently fired harmlessly high. The Royalist forces started to be steadily forced back, Langdale always attempting to ensure that they had a clear line of retreat to the Ribble bridge.

The two Parliamentary regiments on the left of their line were in difficulties and making little progress. One of the two was from Lambert's command and he joined the front rank on foot to try and encourage them forward. After a while he gave orders for a brigade of Lancashire militia, of about 1,600 men, which was being held in reserve, to move forward to support the attack on the left. At least a large part and possibly all of the five under-strength regiments making up this brigade advanced to the left of the two, much stronger, Parliamentary regiments already engaged. As the Royalist line did not extend all the way to the Ribble, and as unengaged Royalists had been sucked into the earlier fighting, the Lancashire troops found no opponents in front of them. Instead of turning to take the outflanked Royalists in the rear the Parliamentarians continued west along a boggy track called Watery Lane, through a marsh known as Fishwick Bottoms, heading for the bridge over the Ribble. Hamilton continued to ignore the fighting to the east and the Scottish infantry continued to move away from the fighting and cross Preston Bridge. Some modern historians have suggested that this was a sensible attempt to take up a defensive position south of the Ribble until the Royalist cavalry could re-join the infantry. They consider that committing all of their infantry to battle on the relatively open ground north of the river with almost no cavalry support would have seemed most unwise to the Royalist commanders.

Of the three New Model Army regiments advancing on the Parliamentarian right, only the one nearest the road was able to get to grips with the Royalist infantry opposing them; possibly the other two were slowed by the difficulties of the terrain. Two parliamentary cavalry regiments – each up to 480 men strong – operating on their right were able to make better, if slow, progress. They worked their way, unopposed, around the Royalist left. By this time the Scots had put all their troops bar two infantry brigades and a cavalry rearguard of unknown strength over the Ribble. Seeing the troopers of the rearguard, the Parliamentarians attacked. The Scottish cavalry initially held their position and withstood two charges from the Parliamentarians. Then they broke and fled, closely pursued by their opponents. The commanders of the well-trained New Model Army cavalry kept their men well in hand, pulling them up when they were in danger of becoming embroiled with the Scottish infantry. The cavalry reformed and, backtracking, fell upon the left flank and rear of Langdale's infantry. Having been fiercely attacked from the front for several hours, with both flanks turned, cut off from possible retreat to the Ribble Bridge, and with cavalry now attacking their rear, Langdale's command fell apart.

As Langdale's men lost heart, two more Parliamentarian cavalry regiments renewed the attack down the road; they charged straight through the Royalist line, which fled. Many of the English Royalists surrendered or were cut down. The rest fled, some reached Preston, but the fight had gone out of them and the town was cleared and captured by two regiments of Parliamentarian cavalry. The cavalry element of Langdale's force had not been engaged, but when their infantry were defeated they retreated north towards Kirkby Lonsdale with the survivors of the Scottish rearguard and the lance-armed cavalry who had been seconded to Langdale. Two regiments of Parliamentarian cavalry pursued them. When Langdale's position was being overrun, Hamilton was near Preston with his staff, trying to pull together the Royalist cavalry in the area. The two Scottish infantry brigades north of the Ribble were ordered to the bridge to defend it, but never arrived, either surrendered en masse or being swept away in the rout and then taken prisoner. As Parliamentarian cavalry charged down Church Street, quelling resistance in Preston, Hamilton's group made for a ford across the river. Fighting off three attacks by Parliamentarian cavalry they eventually swam their horses to the south bank. Langdale extricated himself from the ruin of his command and joined them at some point.

=== Fight for the bridge ===
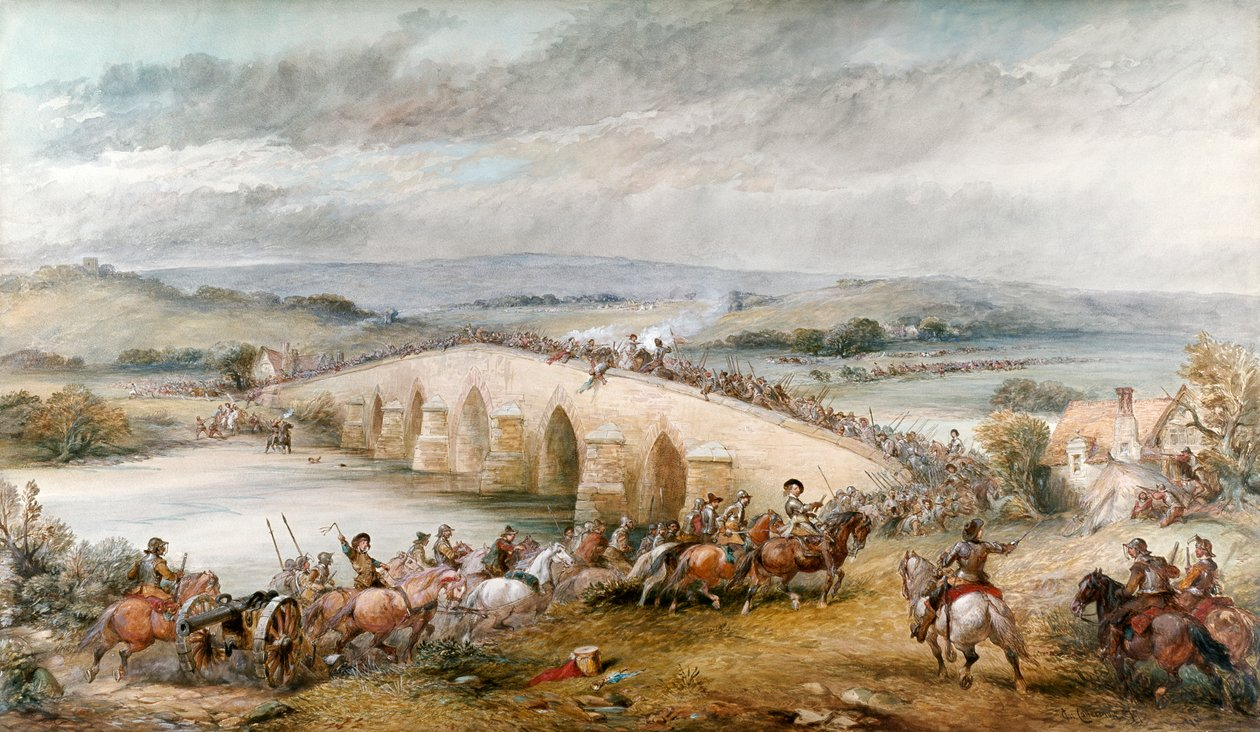
A 19th-century impression of the fight for Preston Bridge

Parliamentarian musketeers from the Lancastrian brigade took up positions on the escarpment north of the Ribble at Frenchwood, from which their fire could dominate access to Preston Bridge on the north and make its southern approaches dangerous. The Royalists defending the northern approach to the bridge had no cover and suffered casualties while unable to reply. Attempts to send reinforcements across the bridge from the south were hampered by the heavy Parliamentarian fire. Another Parliamentarian infantry regiment arrived to add to the musket fire targeting the Royalist bridgehead and the Lancastrian brigade launched an attack on it. It took two hours of furious fighting before their pikemen were able to defeat the Scottish defenders and then push their way across the bridge.

About 800 yards (700 m) south of the Ribble was a smaller river, the Darwen, crossed by a bridge similar to but smaller than Preston Bridge. Immediately to the south of that was a steep rise to Walton Hill. The commander of the Scottish infantry, General William Baillie, concentrated his remaining forces on the hill, while the Parliamentarians pursuing the Royalists fleeing from Preston Bridge captured the Darwen bridge. (Note: The River Darwen is referenced by the contemporary poet John Milton in a poem dedicated to Cromwell with the line "While Darwent Streams with Blood of Scots imbru'd".) Night was falling and there was a pause in the fighting: the Royalists were reeling from the unexpected disaster which had struck them, the Parliamentarians were scattered over the field and there were thousands of Royalist prisoners to deal with. The surviving Royalist forces, although dispersed, were still at least as numerous as the Parliamentarian army.

Cromwell, fearful of a Scottish counterattack, had his men line the north bank of the Ribble overnight. The same evening he wrote in a letter that the Royalists were broken and had only been saved from destruction by nightfall. A Royalist council of war decided that the surviving units should make their way south immediately, to be well away from Cromwell's force by morning and to link up with their main force of cavalry at Wigan. To move as rapidly and stealthily as possible the Scots abandoned their baggage and ammunition trains, only taking with them what each man could carry. The baggage, equipment, artillery and ammunition left behind was ordered to be destroyed once the march was well under way, but it was not and was captured before daylight.

=== Retreat ===
The Royalist baggage was discovered and it became clear that the Scots were making off, relying on the dark and the heavy rain to mask their march. Cromwell was alerted and pulled together a force of cavalry and sent them across the bridge onto the road south. Despite their exhaustion, within 3 miles (5 km) they had closed with the few cavalry the Scots were using as a rearguard. The whole of the mounted contingent of the New Model Army – less the two cavalry regiments following Langdale, but reinforced by some Lancashire troops – was now in pursuit, some 2,500 cavalry and dragoons. Their advance guard harried the Scottish cavalry, determined to break through them to force the Royalist infantry to stand and fight. The Scottish cavalry under Middleton, recalled from Wigan, took up a position to hold off the Parliamentarian pursuit.

Throughout 18 August the Parliamentarians pressed so aggressively that in one skirmish the commander of their advance guard was killed. All of the infantry of the New Model Army were following on, a further 2,900 men. The Parliamentarians were still outnumbered by the Scots, who were approximately 7,000 strong. Local militia had been left in charge of Preston and the prisoners. By nightfall both sides were exhausted. The Scots entered Wigan, thoroughly plundered it and marched on through the night. Some men had not eaten nor slept for two nights, cavalrymen fell asleep in their saddles, the rain continued.

== Battle of Winwick ==
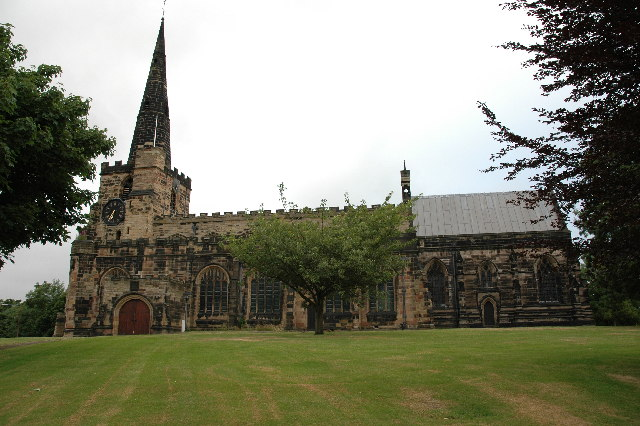
St Oswald's Church, Winwick

On 19 August, some 9 miles (14 km) south of Wigan, the Scots halted between the villages of Newton and Winwick at a naturally strong defensive position. The Scots numbered about 7,000 men, while the Parliamentarians were pursuing with nearly all of the New Model Army, supplemented by some local troops: approximately 2,500 cavalry and dragoons and 2,900 infantry for a total of some 5,400–5,500 men. The Parliamentarian horses were exhausted and unable to manage more than a walk.

The Parliamentarian pursuers rode up the road and in the words of one of their number, Captain John Hodgson, the Scots "snaffled our forlorn [advance guard], and put them to retreat". Once Parliamentarian infantry arrived they attempted to storm the Scottish positions but were held up. Fierce fighting continued for several hours, with repeated Parliamentarian charges and prolonged close quarter fighting between the opposing pike formations with the Parliamentarians unable to dislodge the Scots. The Parliamentarian infantry fell back. The Parliamentarian cavalry pinned the Scots in place – who by now had run out of dry gunpowder – while their infantry took a circuitous route, taking care to stay out of sight behind woods and in dead ground, and emerged on the flank and rear of the Scots. The sight of the enemy appearing unexpectedly on their flank was too much for the exhausted Scots, who broke and fled. A large number routed towards Winwick and the Parliamentarian cavalry followed, cutting down many men. The Scots discarded their weapons and crammed into the village church, where they were taken prisoner. Seeing that the battle was lost, the Scottish cavalry withdrew in the direction of Warrington, 3 miles (5 km) to the south. The majority of the Scottish infantry, about 2,700 men, followed them, hard pressed by the Parliamentarians.

When the remaining Scottish infantry, fewer than 2,600 men, reached Warrington late on 19 August they discovered that their cavalry and their commander had abandoned them. Hamilton left a message saying they would "preserve themselves for a better time" and ordering the infantry to surrender on the best terms they could get. The commander of the infantry, Lieutenant General Baillie, was at such a loss that he turned to his staff and "beseeched any that would to shoot him through the head". Warrington bridge was barricaded and terms of surrender were sought. Cromwell took them prisoner, sparing their lives and their immediate personal possessions. Approximately 1,300 mounted Scots headed south. Discipline collapsed, troopers, even officers, deserted; one trooper shot his sergeant and was himself executed. Local militia repeatedly attacked, one group capturing the commander of the Scottish cavalry. The weather continued to be wet and stormy. At Uttoxeter on 24 August a handful of the senior officers left, some eventually made their way to safety. Hamilton was too sick to move and surrendered on terms to the pursuing Parliamentarian pursuit, the prisoners were promised their lives and their clothes, they were not to be beaten, the sick and wounded would be treated locally and Hamilton was allowed six servants.

== Casualties ==
Modern historians accept that approximately 1,000 Royalists were killed at Preston and 4,000 taken prisoner. During the retreat from Preston, at Winwick and its aftermath, approximately 1,000 Royalists are believed to have died and 7,000–8,000 to have been captured, contemporary estimates vary widely. Neither contemporary nor modern estimates agree on the total numbers. Those Scottish prisoners who had served voluntarily, as opposed to being conscripted, were sold as slaves, either to work the land in the Americas or as galley slaves to Venice. Hamilton was beheaded for treason in March 1649. The English Parliament announced that their losses during the campaign had been 100 or less killed. Cromwell declined to quantify the loss, but did speak of "many" wounded. The Parliamentary figure of 100 dead is widely used by modern historians but Bull and Seed are sceptical and estimate that in excess of 500 were killed or wounded.

== Aftermath ==
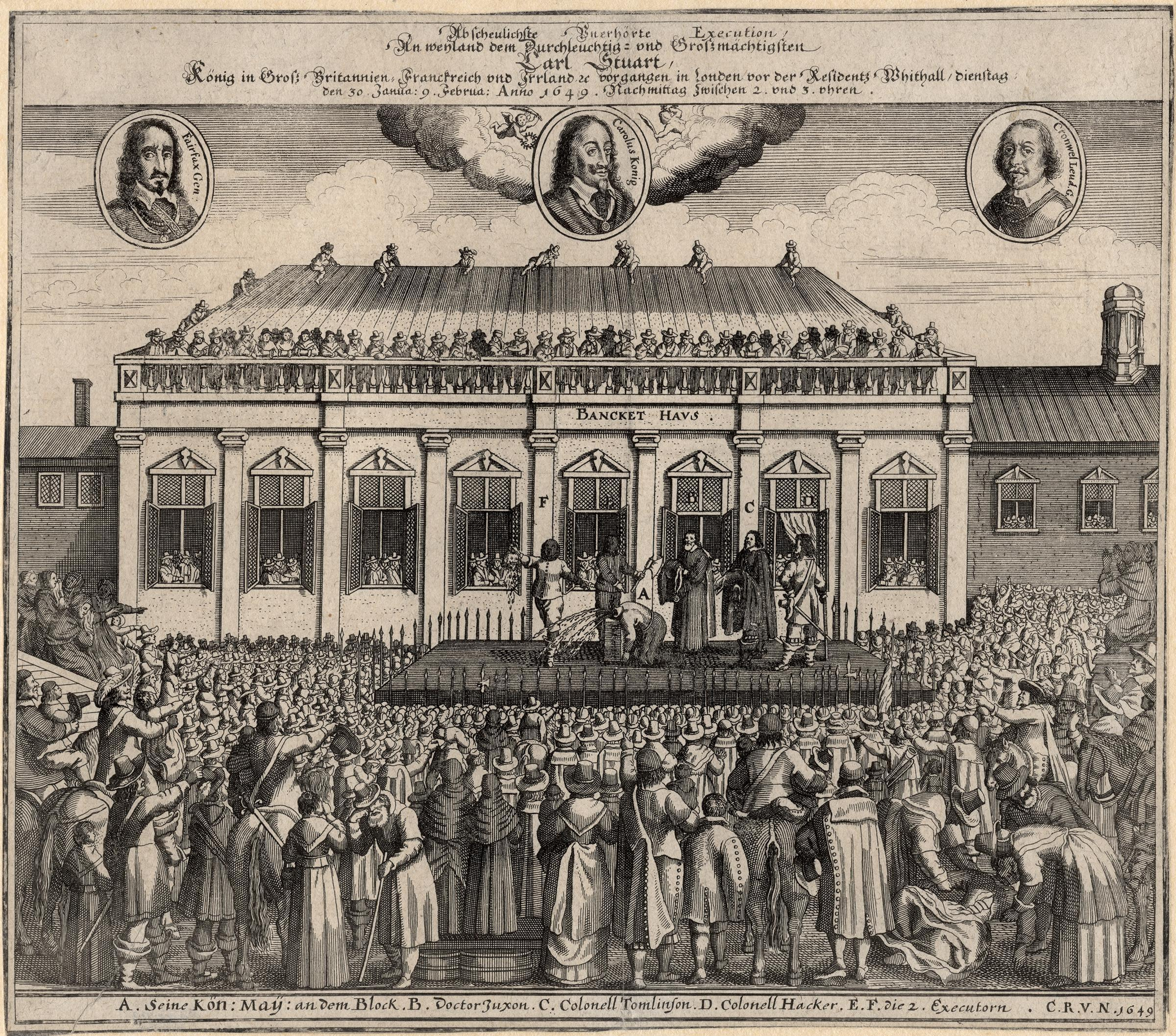
Contemporary German print of the execution of Charles I

After Winwick, Cromwell turned north. More than 1,100 Royalists commanded by Musgrave were trapped at Appleby and surrendered on generous terms. Munro withdrew his corps to Scotland with little fighting; from there it was ordered back to Ireland. Preston and Winwick were the last battles of the Second English Civil War; Colchester surrendered to Fairfax on 27 August 1648. The destruction of the Engager army led to further political upheaval in Scotland and the faction opposed to the Engagement was able to gain control of the government, with the assistance of a group of English Parliamentarian cavalry led by Cromwell.

Exasperated by the duplicity of Charles I and by the English Parliament's refusal to stop negotiating with him and accept the demands of the New Model Army, the Army purged Parliament and established the Rump Parliament, which appointed a High Court of Justice to try Charles I for treason against the English people. He was convicted and on 30 January 1649 beheaded. On 19 May, with the establishment of the Commonwealth of England, the country became a republic.

The Scottish Parliament, which had not been consulted before the King's execution, declared his son Charles II, King of Britain and set about recruiting rapidly an army to support him. The leaders of the English Commonwealth felt threatened by the Scots assembling another army and the New Model Army, led by Cromwell, invaded Scotland on 22 July. After 14 months of hard fighting, Scotland was largely subjugated and a Scottish counter-invasion was crushed at the battle of Worcester. The defeated Scottish government was dissolved and the English Parliament absorbed the kingdom of Scotland into the Commonwealth.

After in-fighting between factions in the English Parliament and the army, Cromwell ruled over the Commonwealth as Lord Protector from December 1653 until his death in September 1658. On 3 February 1660 the dominant army faction, under Lieutenant General George Monck, called new parliamentary elections. These resulted in the Convention Parliament which on 8 May 1660 declared that Charles II had reigned as the lawful monarch since the execution of Charles I. Charles II returned from exile and was crowned king of England on 23 April 1661. (Note: He had been crowned king of Scotland twelve years earlier on 1 January 1651 at Scone, the traditional place of coronation for Scottish monarchs.)

== Notes, citations and sources ==
=== Sources ===
- Baker, Anthony (1986) [1986]. A Battlefield Atlas of the English Civil War. London: Promotional Reprint. ISBN 978-1-85648-334-6.
- Braddick, Michael (2009). God's Fury, England's Fire: A New History of the English Civil Wars. London: Penguin UK. ISBN 978-0-14-100897-4.
- Brooks, Richard (2005). Cassell's Battlefields of Britain and Ireland. London: Weidenfeld & Nicolson. ISBN 978-0-304-36333-9.
- Bull, Stephen; Seed, Mike (1998). Bloody Preston: The Battle of Preston, 1648. Lancaster: Carnegie. ISBN 978-1-85936-041-5.
- Dow, F. D. (1979). Cromwellian Scotland 1651–1660. Edinburgh: John Donald Publishers. ISBN 978-0-85976-049-2.
- Ffoulkes, Charles John & Hopkinson, Edward Campbell (2013) [1938]. Sword, Lance & Bayonet: a Record of the Arms of the British Army & Navy. Cambridge: Cambridge University Press. ISBN 978-1-107-67015-0.
- Furgol, Edward (2002). "The Civil Wars in Scotland". In John Kenyon & Jane Ohlmeyer (eds.). The Civil Wars: A Military History of England, Scotland and Ireland 1638–1660. Oxford: Oxford University Press. pp. 41–72. ISBN 978-0-19-280278-1.
- Gaunt, Peter (1991). A Nation Under Siege: The Civil War in Wales, 1642-48. London: Cadw, Welsh Historic Monuments. ISBN 978-0-11-701222-6.
- Gentles, Ian (2002). "The Civil Wars in England". In John Kenyon & Jane Ohlmeyer (eds.). The Civil Wars: A Military History of England, Scotland and Ireland 1638–1660. Oxford: Oxford University Press. pp. 103–154. ISBN 978-0-19-280278-1.
- "Battle of Winwick (Also Known as Battle of Red Bank) 1648". Historic England. 2023. Archived from the original on 27 November 2024.
- Keeble, N. H. (2002). The Restoration: England in the 1660s. Oxford: Blackwell. ISBN 978-0-631-19574-0.
- Kenyon, John & Ohlmeyer, Jane (2002). "The Background to the Civil Wars in the Stuart Kingdoms". In John Kenyon & Jane Ohlmeyer (eds.). The Civil Wars: A Military History of England, Scotland and Ireland 1638–1660. Oxford: Oxford University Press. pp. 3–40. ISBN 978-0-19-280278-1.
- MacKenzie, Kirsteen (2009). "Oliver Cromwell and the Solemn League and Covenant of the Three Kingdoms". In Patrick Little (ed.). Oliver Cromwell: New Perspectives. Basingstoke: Palgrave Macmillan. pp. 142–167. ISBN 978-0-230-57421-2.
- Reese, Peter (2006). Cromwell's Masterstroke: The Battle of Dunbar 1650. Barnsley: Pen & Sword Military. ISBN 978-1-84415-179-0.
- Reid, Stuart (2008) [2004]. Dunbar 1650: Cromwell's Most Famous Victory. Oxford: Osprey Publishing. ISBN 978-1-84176-774-1.
- Rodwell, Warwick (2013). The Coronation Chair and Stone of Scone: History, Archaeology and Conservation. Oxford: Oxbow Books. ISBN 978-1-78297-153-5.
- Royle, Trevor (2005) [2004]. Civil War: The Wars of the Three Kingdoms, 1638–1660. London: Abacus. ISBN 978-0-349-11564-1.
- Sherwood, Roy Edward (1997). Oliver Cromwell: King In All But Name, 1653–1658. New York: St Martin's Press. ISBN 978-0-7509-1066-8.
- Stewart, Laura A.M. (2016). Rethinking the Scottish Revolution. Oxford: Oxford University Press. ISBN 978-0-19-871844-4.
- Wanklyn, Malcolm (2014) [2006]. Decisive Battles of the English Civil War. Barnsley, South Yorkshire: Pen & Sword. ISBN 978-1-78346-975-8.
- Woolrych, Austin (2002). Britain in Revolution 1625–1660. Oxford: Oxford University Press. ISBN 978-0-19-820081-9.
- Young, John R. (1996). The Scottish Parliament 1649–1661: A Political and Constitutional Analysis. Edinburgh: John Donald Publishers. ISBN 978-0-85976-412-4.
