= Richard Sherlock (priest) =

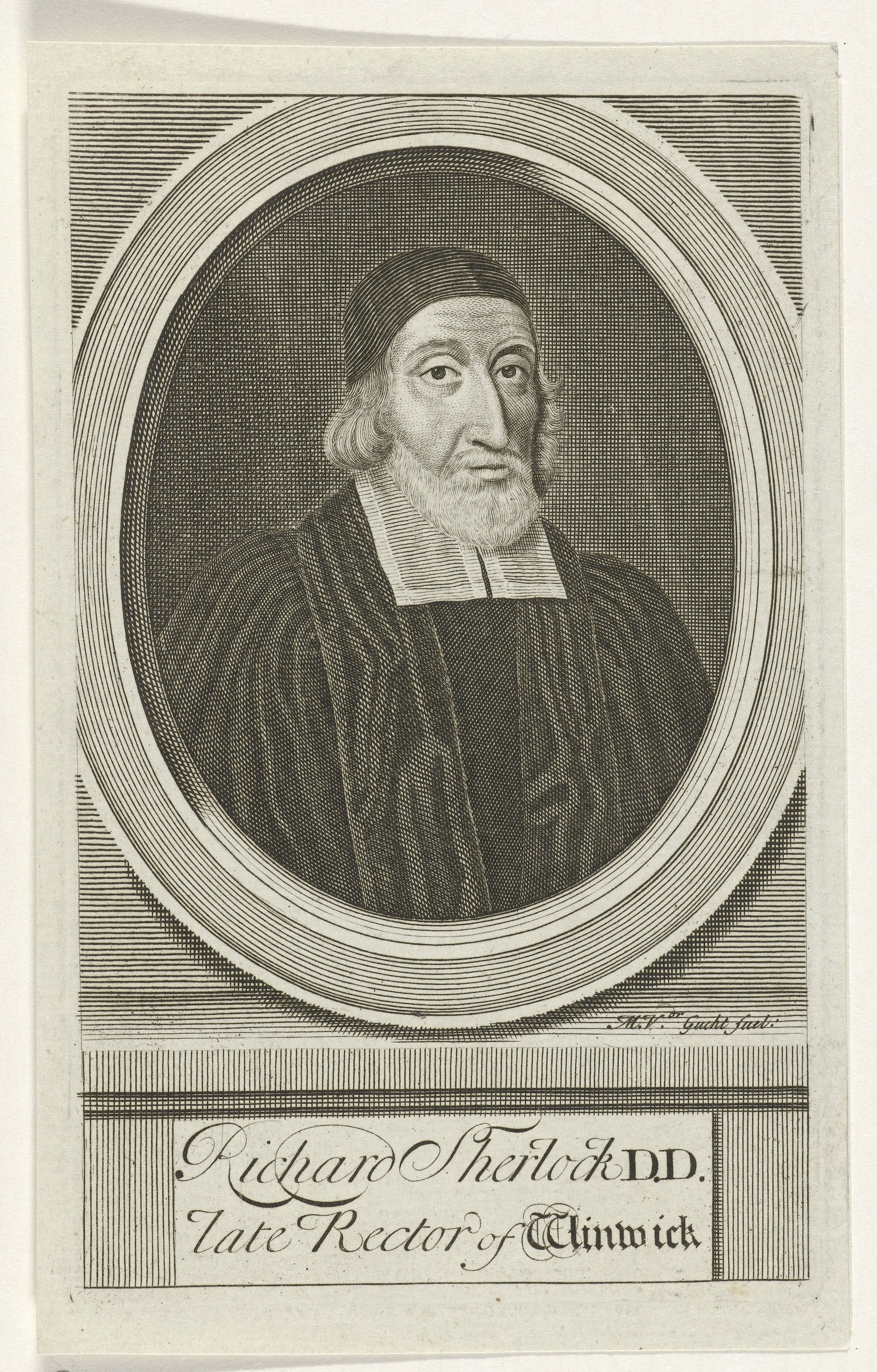
Richard Sherlock

Richard Sherlock (11 November 1612 – 20 June 1689) was a seventeenth-century English priest.

== Early life ==
Sherlock was born at Oxton, a village in the Cheshire peninsula of Wirral, on 11 November 1612, and was baptised at Woodchurch on 15 November. His father, William, a small yeoman, died while Richard was still young, but his mother gave him a learned education. (Note that alternative sources suggest Sherlock's father may have been John Sherlock; the matter is of some interest in establishing Sherlock's relationship with Thomas Wilson, Bishop of Sodor and Man).

He was first sent to Magdalen Hall, Oxford, whence he was removed, to save expense, to Trinity College, Dublin There he graduated M.A. in 1633. Having entered holy orders, he became minister of several small united parishes in Ireland, where he remained till the breaking out of the rebellion of 1641. Upon James Butler, 1st Marquis of Ormonde's truce with the rebels (15 September 1643), Sherlock returned to England as chaplain of one of the regiments sent by the marquis to aid King Charles in his struggle with parliament. He was present at the Battle of Nantwich on 25 January 1644, in which Thomas Fairfax completely defeated John Byron, 1st Baron Byron and captured many prisoners. Among these was Sherlock, who, on regaining his liberty, made his way to Oxford, where he became chaplain to the governor of the garrison, and also a chaplain of New College. In consideration of several sermons that he preached, either at court or before the Oxford Parliament, the degree of Bachelor of Divinity (BD) was conferred upon him in 1646.

Expelled from Oxford by the parliamentary visitors about 1648, he became curate of the neighbouring village of Cassington, where he dwelt in the same house as the mother of Anthony Wood, and made the acquaintance of the future antiquary, then a youth of seventeen. On being ejected from Cassington in 1652, Sherlock became chaplain to Robert Bindlosse, a royalist baronet residing at Borwick Hall, near Lancaster. Here he remained some years, courageously remonstrating with his patron when he gave scandal by his conduct, yet preserving his attachment to the end. While at Borwick, Sherlock entered into controversy with Richard Hubberthorne, a Quaker, publishing in 1654 a book entitled The Quaker's Wilde Questions objected against the Ministers of the Gospel.

== Winwick and the connection with the Earl of Derby ==
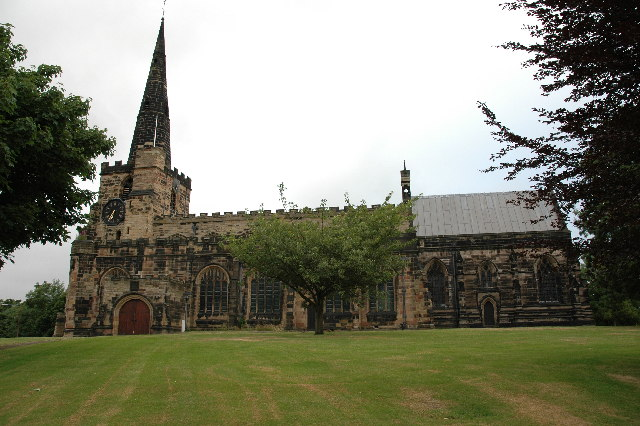
St Oswald's Church, Winwick

In or about 1658 Sherlock was introduced by Bindlosse to Charles Stanley, 8th Earl of Derby, who appointed him his chaplain at Lathom House. At the Restoration he was placed by the earl on a commission for the settlement of all matters ecclesiastical and civil in the Isle of Man. He fulfilled his part of this task 'to the entire satisfaction of the lord and people of that island', and returned to Lathom. In 1660 he was nominated to the rich rectory of Winwick in Lancashire, but, through a dispute as to the patronage, he did not get full possession of it till 1662. He remained at St Oswald's Church, Winwick for the rest of his life, ‘so constantly resident that, in an incumbency of nearly thirty years, he was scarcely absent from his benefice as many weeks; so constant a preacher that, though he entertained three curates in his own houses, he rarely devolved that duty upon any of them; such a lover of monarchy that he never shaved his beard after the murder of Charles I; so frugal in his personal habits that the stipend of one of his curates would have provided for him; and so charitable that, out of one of the best benefices in England, he scarcely left behind him one year's income, and that for the most part to pious uses’. He exhibited so much zeal for the Church of England that he was ‘accounted by precise persons popishly affected’. His fidelity to the Anglican church is clearly evidenced by his works.

Remaining unmarried, his rectory became a kind of training-school for young clergymen, among whom was his own nephew, Thomas Wilson, afterwards bishop of Sodor and Man. Sherlock, who proceeded Doctor of Divinity (DD) at Dublin in 1660, died at Winwick on 20 June 1689, and was buried in his parish church. In his will he left bequests to the poor of several of the parishes with which he had been connected.

== Works ==
His works are:

1. The Quaker's Wilde Questions objected against the Ministers of the Gospel, and many Sacred Gifts and Offices of Religion, with brief answers thereunto. Together with a Discourse of the Holy Spirit his impressions and workings on the Souls of Men, 1654. This book was reprinted and enlarged in 1656, with two additional discourses on divine revelation, mediate and immediate, and on error, heresie, and schism. This work was animadverted on (remark or comment critically, usually with strong disapproval or censure) by George Fox in The Great Mystery of the Great Whore unfolded, 1659.
2. The Principles of the Holy Catholick Religion, or the Catechism of the Church of England Paraphrast, written for the use of Borwick Hall, 1656; this work was often reprinted.
3. Mercurius Christianus: the Practical Christian, a Treatise explaining the duty of Self-examination, 1673. This, Sherlock's principal work, was greatly enlarged in subsequent editions. To the sixth edition, which appeared in 1712, was prefixed a ‘Life’ of the author by Bishop Wilson. The four parts into which the work was divided were sometimes published separately.
4. Several Short but Seasonable Discourses touching Common and Private Prayer, relating to the Publick Offices of the Church, 1684. This includes The Irregularity of a Private Prayer in a Publick Congregation, first published in 1674.
