= Battle of Winwick =

1648 battle of the Second English Civil War

- Part of the Second English Civil War
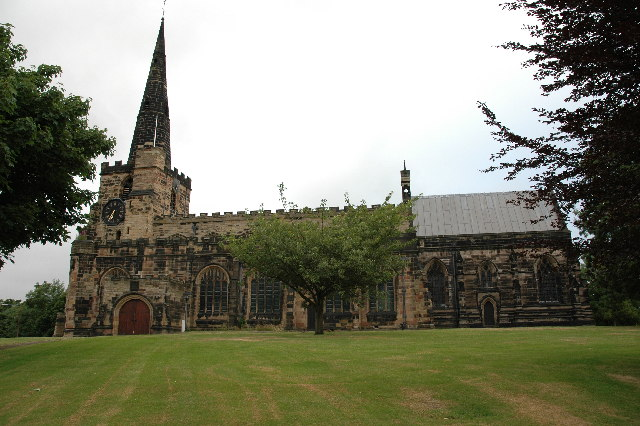
- St Oswald's Church, Winwick
Date	19 August 1648
Location	Winwick, Cheshire 53.440°N 2.605°W
Result	Parliamentarian victory

Belligerents
Scotland; English Royalists	Parliamentarians

Commanders and leaders
Duke of Hamilton; William Baillie	Oliver Cromwell

Strength
c. 4,000–6,000 infantry engaged; c. 2,500–3,000 cavalry, not engaged	c. 2,900 infantry; c. 2,500 cavalry

Casualties and losses
c. 1,000 killed; c. 4,500 captured; c. 2,500–3,000 cavalry captured later	Fewer than 100 killed; Several hundred wounded
- North west England (with modern boundaries)

The Battle of Winwick (also known as the Battle of Red Bank) was fought on 19 August 1648 near the Lancashire village of Winwick between part of a Royalist army under Lieutenant General William Baillie and a Parliamentarian army commanded by Lieutenant General Oliver Cromwell. The Royalists were defeated with all of those who took part in the fighting, their army's entire infantry force, either killed or captured. The Royalist mounted component fled but surrendered five days after the battle. Winwick was the last battle of the Second English Civil War.

The First English Civil War between Royalist supporters of Charles I and an alliance of Parliamentarian and Scottish forces ended in 1646 with Charles defeated and a prisoner. He continued to negotiate with several factions among his opponents and this sparked the Second English Civil War in 1648: a series of mutinies and Royalist uprisings in England and Wales, and a Scottish Royalist invasion of north-west England. The invading army was attacked and defeated by a smaller Parliamentarian army at the battle of Preston on 17 August. The majority of the Royalists, mostly Scots, had not been engaged but they fled south, closely pursued by the Parliamentarians, mostly of the New Model Army. On 19 August, hungry, cold, soaking wet, exhausted and short of dry powder, the Scottish infantry turned to fight at Winwick. Their cavalry waited 3 miles (5 km) away at Warrington.

The Parliamentarian advance guard was put to flight with heavy casualties. After a lengthy pause, Parliamentarian infantry arrived: they attempted to storm the Scottish position and were thrown back. A full-scale assault was then launched which resulted in more than three hours of furious but indecisive close-quarters fighting. The Parliamentarians fell back again, pinned the Scots in place with their cavalry and sent their infantry on a circuitous flank march. As soon as the Scots saw this force appear on their right flank they broke and fled. Parliamentarian cavalry pursued, killing many. All of the surviving Scots surrendered: their infantry either at Winwick church or in Warrington, their cavalry on 24 August at Uttoxeter. Winwick was the final battle of the war. In its aftermath Charles was beheaded on 30 January 1649 and England became a republic on 19 May.

== Primary sources ==
The three most useful accounts of the short campaign which included the battles of Preston and Winwick were written by Oliver Cromwell, commander of the Parliamentarian army; Marmaduke Langdale, commander of the English Royalists who bore the brunt of the fighting at Preston; and John Hodgson, a lieutenant in a Parliamentarian infantry regiment. The first two accounts were written shortly after the campaign; Hodgson wrote his memoirs in 1683. Cromwell was the only one of the three present at Winwick. There is also a letter by the Parliamentarian cavalry officer Major John Sanderson giving details of his participation in the battle and an account of it written by the Royalist James Heath in 1661. Two partial accounts of the campaign were written by senior Scottish commanders in the 1670s.

== Opposing forces ==
=== Infantry ===
Infantry formations, equipment and tactics were similar in both armies. The basic tactical formation was the regiment, which varied greatly in size. An infantry regiment was usually made up of 10 equally sized companies and typically had a nominal or establishment strength of 800 or 1,000 men; this was rarely met. Each was composed of both musketmen and pikemen.

The musketmen were armed with muskets possessing 4-foot-long (1.2 m) barrels and, mostly, matchlock firing mechanisms. These relied on the glowing end of a length of slow match, thin cord soaked in saltpetre, igniting the weapon's priming powder when the trigger was pulled. They were reliable and robust weapons, but their effectiveness was severely reduced in poor weather. Keeping the slow match burning at all times resulted in the consumption of a vast amount of it, while dousing it rendered the musket useless. Balancing combat readiness against logistical capability called for fine judgement from a regiment's officers. A few musketmen on each side were equipped with the more reliable flintlock muskets. In 1648 musket tactics were in transition from firing one rank at a time so as to maintain a steady fire, to the entire unit discharging a volley simultaneously for shock effect. A well-trained musketman took approximately 40 seconds to reload and would carry ten rounds of ammunition.

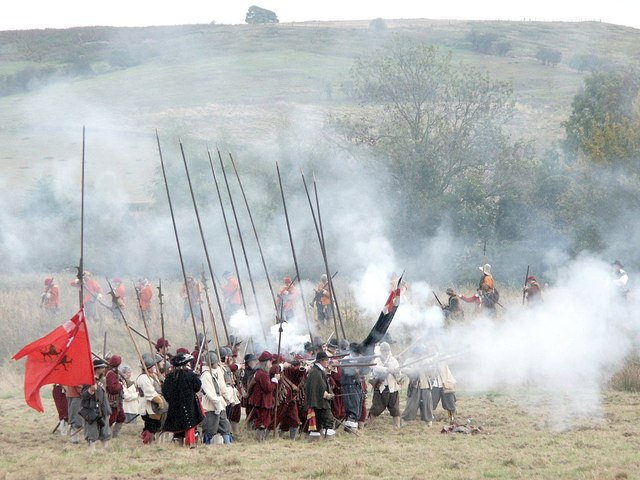
Civil War reenactors in a combined group of musket and pikemen

Pikemen were equipped with pikes: long wooden shafts tipped with steel points. Pikes as issued were normally 18-foot-long (5.5 m), but on the march they were commonly cut down to a more wieldy 15 feet (4.6 m) or so. The pikemen carried basic swords and typically wore steel helmets but no other armour; in some regiments a few pikemen, usually those in the front rank, would have also worn body armour. Military manuals of the time suggested a ratio of two musketmen for each pikeman, but in practice commanders usually attempted to maximise the number of musketmen and a higher ratio was the rule. (Note: The Parliamentarian New Model Army was formed in 1645 with three musketeers for each pikeman. By 1650 some Royalist regiments had dispensed with pikemen altogether, although this was not the case with any of those at Winwick or elsewhere during the campaign.)

Both armies organised their infantry regiments into brigades of three regiments each, which doctrine suggested be deployed two regiments abreast, with the third behind as a reserve. The men in each unit would form up four or five ranks deep and in a relatively loose formation, with about 3 feet (0.9 m) of frontage per file; so an infantry regiment of 600 might form up 120 men wide and 5 deep, giving it a frontage of 360 feet (110 m) and a depth of 15 feet (4.6 m). The pikemen would be placed in the centre of a formation, in a "stand", with the musketmen divided on each side. The usual tactic against infantry was for the musketmen to fire on their opponents and once it was thought they had been sufficiently weakened or demoralised the stand of pikemen would advance, attempting to break through the enemy centre. This was known as a "push of the pike". The musketmen would also advance, engaging the enemy with their musket butts, (Note: Bayonets were not used by British infantry until the 1660s.) which were steel-plated for this purpose, and attempting to envelop the opposing formation.

Against cavalry, doctrine called for infantry units to tighten the spacing between their files so that each man took up only 18 inches (46 cm) frontage and to advance steadily. To be effective against infantry, cavalry needed to break into their formation, and if the men were packed together this was not possible. It was accepted that so long as the morale of the infantry held, cavalry could do little against the front of such a formation. However, the flanks and rear were increasingly vulnerable when the infantry packed more closely together, as this made manoeuvring or turning the unit more difficult.

=== Cavalry ===
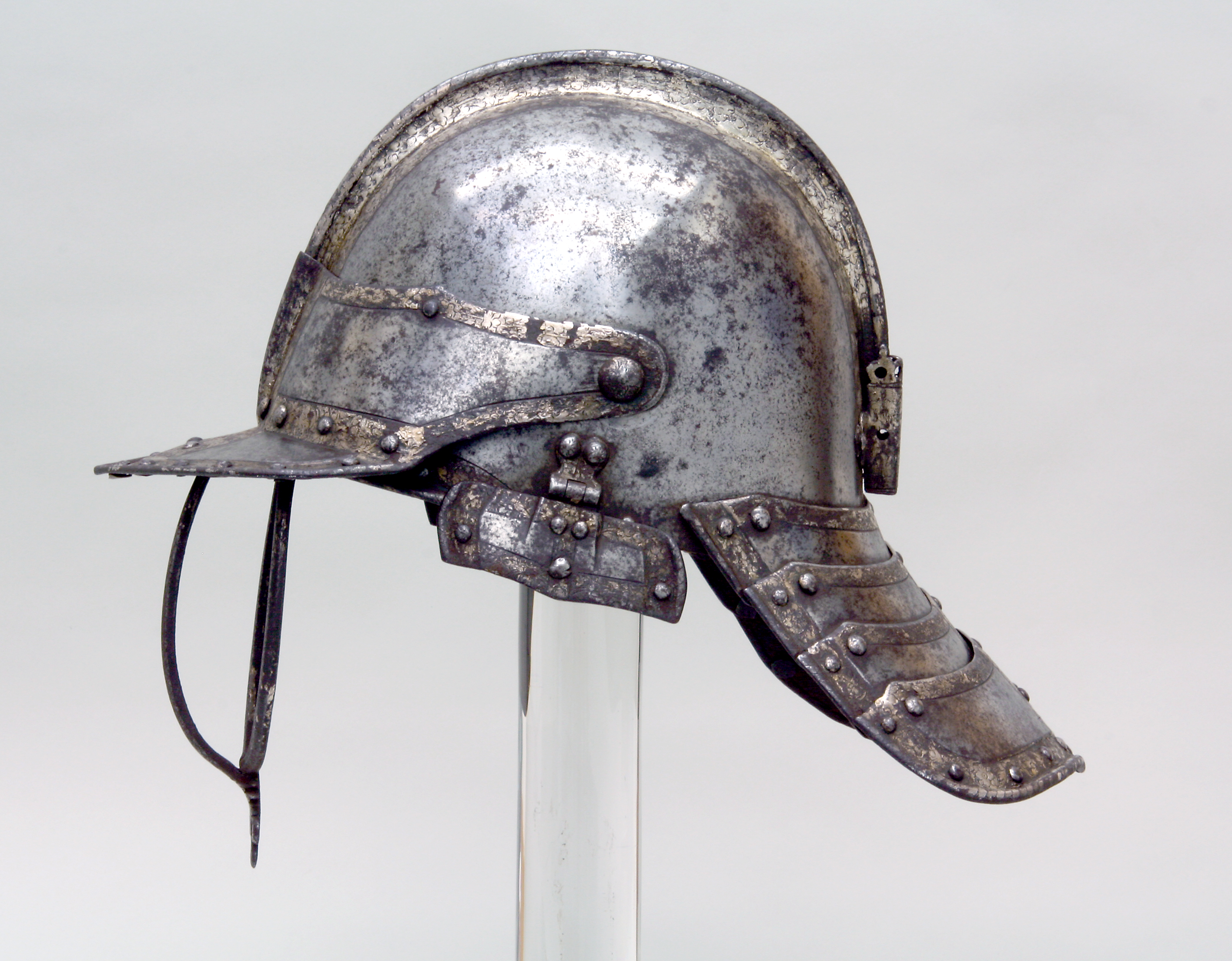
An English lobster-tailed pot helmet c. 1630 – c. 1640, with neck protection (the "lobster tail"), three-barred face protection, a peak and a longitudinal comb on the skull; the hinged cheekpieces are missing

Most of the Parliamentarian cavalry were mounted on large, for the time, horses. The cavalrymen all wore metal lobster-tailed pot helmets which protected the head and, usually, the neck, cheeks and, to an extent, face; and thigh-length boots. Body armour – a cuirass (metal chest and back plates) – was worn by most cavalrymen, although many relied on just a jacket of thick uncured leather. They were each armed with two pistols and a sword. The pistols were 18 to 24 inches (46–61 cm) long and had a very limited effective range. Most but not all cavalry pistols had flintlock firing mechanisms, which were more reliable in damp or windy weather than matchlock mechanisms. Flintlock mechanisms were more expensive than matchlock ones and were usually reserved for the cavalry, who found igniting and using the slow match while controlling a horse inconvenient. The swords were straight, 3-foot-long (90 cm) and effective at both cutting and thrusting.

The Royalist cavalry were similarly equipped with helmets, pistols, swords and body armour, although many of the Scots bore lances rather than pistols. Scottish horses were smaller and lighter than their English equivalents; this gave them greater manoeuvrability but put them at a disadvantage in a face-to-face confrontation. The Scottish cavalry were well mounted, but inexperienced and ill disciplined. Parliamentarian cavalry were trained to advance very close together, with their riders' legs interlocked, at no faster than a trot – to maintain formation. They would discharge their pistols at very short range and upon coming into contact attempt to use the sheer weight of their mounts and the mass of their formation to force back their opponents and burst through their ranks. Royalist cavalry were more likely to charge at a faster pace and in a looser formation.

Both armies contained dragoons. These had originated as mounted infantry, using horses to increase their operational mobility and dismounting to fight with pikes or muskets. By 1648 they had largely become specialist mounted troops; none carried pikes. The Parliamentarian dragoons were in the process of exchanging their muskets for carbines (shorter-barrelled versions of muskets, more wieldy for carrying on, or even firing from, horseback) or, occasionally, pistols. Scottish dragoons were also partway through this transformation and carried both matchlock muskets and cavalry swords. Dragoons usually acted as scouts, or formed their army's rearguard.

=== Artillery ===
Cannonballs believed to have been found at the site strongly suggest that at least one piece of light artillery was deployed.

=== Summary ===
Most of the Parliamentarian soldiers were seasoned veterans, well trained and with experience of battle. The Scots as a whole were unenthusiastic about another round of warfare and had difficulty raising troops. Some regiments had barely half their establishment, of whom more than half were new recruits, lacking both experience and adequate training. A contemporary exaggerated that "not a fifth man could handle a pike."

== Background ==
In 1639, and again in 1640, Charles I, who was king of both Scotland and England in a personal union, went to war with his Scottish subjects in the Bishops' Wars. These had arisen from the Scots' refusal to accept Charles's attempts to reform the Scottish Kirk to bring it into line with English religious practices. Charles was not successful in these endeavours and the ensuing settlement with his Scottish Parliament in 1641 severely limited his powers. After years of rising tensions the relationship between Charles and his English Parliament broke down, starting the First English Civil War in 1642.

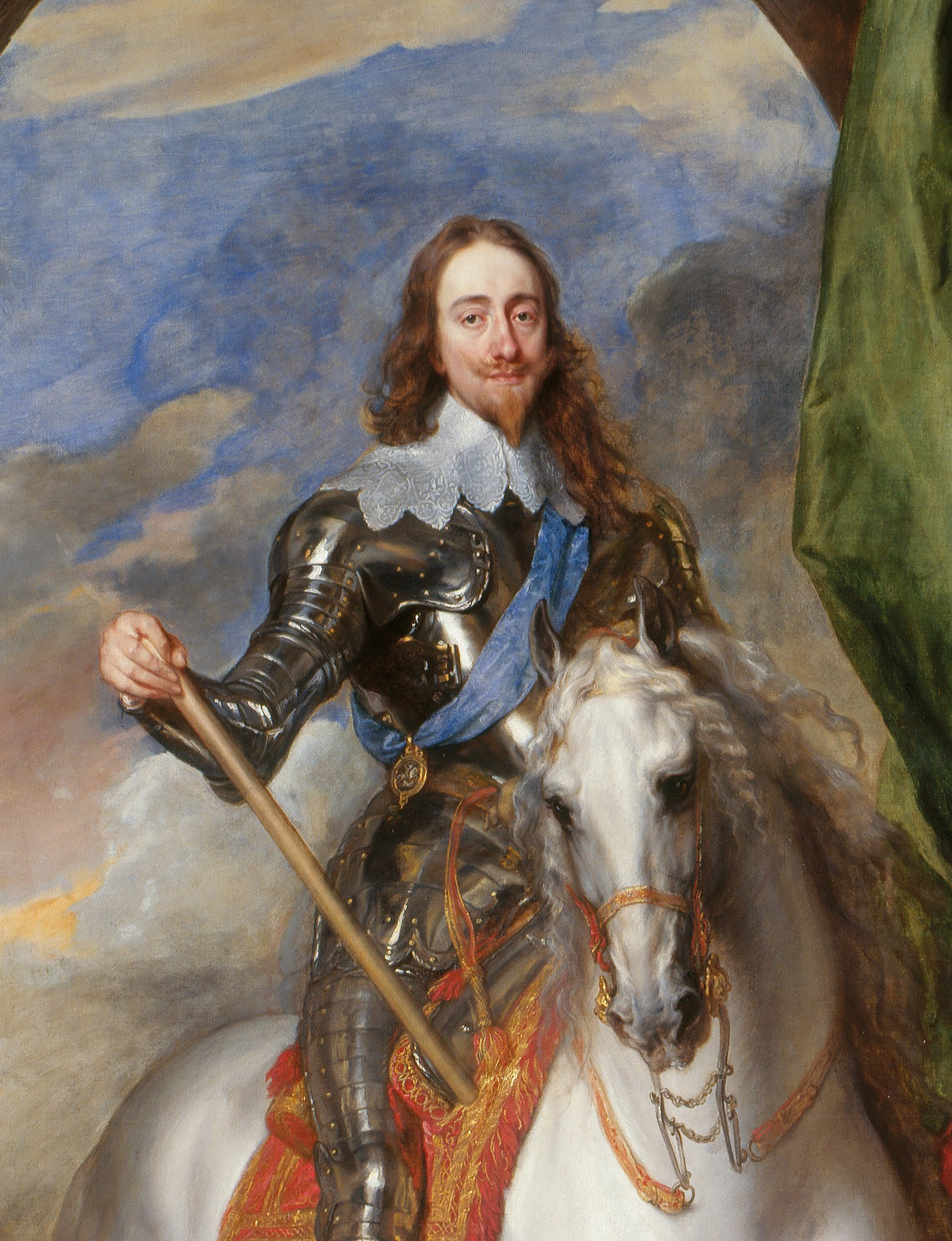
Charles I

In England Charles's supporters, the Royalists, were opposed by the combined forces of the Parliamentarians and the Scots. In 1643 the latter pair formed an alliance bound by the Solemn League and Covenant. After four years of war the Royalists were defeated and Charles surrendered to the Scots on 5 May 1646. The Scots agreed with the English Parliament on a peace settlement which would be put before the King. Known as the Newcastle Propositions, the Scots spent months trying to persuade Charles to agree to them but he refused. The Scots eventually handed Charles over to the English Parliamentary forces in exchange for a financial settlement and left England on 3 February 1647.

Charles then engaged in separate negotiations with different factions. Presbyterian English Parliamentarians and the Scots wanted him to accept a modified version of the Newcastle Propositions, but in June 1647 a junior army officer seized Charles and the army council pressed him to accept the Heads of Proposals, a less demanding set of terms. He rejected these as well and instead signed an offer known as the Engagement, which had been thrashed out with the Scottish delegation, on 26 December 1647. Charles agreed to confirm the Solemn League and Covenant by Act of Parliament in both kingdoms, and other conditions, in return for the Scots' assistance in enforcing his claim to the English throne.

When the Scottish delegation returned to Edinburgh with the Engagement, the Scots were bitterly divided on whether to ratify its terms. After a protracted political struggle those in favour of it, known as the Engagers, gained a majority in the Scottish Parliament and on 11 April 1648 repudiated the 1643 treaty with the Parliamentarians. On 29 April, they seized the English border town of Carlisle.

=== War ===
Oliver Cromwell

Meanwhile, the coalition of interests which had cohered on the Parliamentarian side during the first war fractured in 1647. There were risings in support of the Royalist cause in England and Wales and mutinies by Parliamentarian garrisons. These were especially serious in Kent, Essex and South Wales and marked the start of the Second English Civil War. Six English warships defected to the Royalists. The most reliable military force the Parliamentarian leaders had at their disposal was the New Model Army. (Note: The New Model Army was a standing army formed in 1645 by the Parliamentarians with an establishment of 22,000. It was a permanent and fully professional force; commanded by Thomas Fairfax it gained a formidable reputation during the last two years of the First English Civil War.) This had been split into garrisons across the country; its commander, Sir Thomas Fairfax, based in London, put down the revolt in Kent on 1 June at the fiercely fought Battle of Maidstone. He then moved into Essex and began an eleven-week siege of Colchester. In South Wales the Parliamentarians faced mutinous garrisons in Chepstow, Tenby and Pembroke Castle as well as Royalist risings.

The Scots raised an army under the command of the Duke of Hamilton to send into England to fight on behalf of the King. With rebellion breaking out in England and Wales and the Scottish army marching for the border the future of Britain hung in the balance, in the view of the modern historian Ian Gentles. The summer of 1648 was extremely wet and stormy, causing both sides to be hampered by the weather. Major General John Lambert was in charge of Parliamentarian forces in the north of England. His men harassed the Royalist force around Carlisle, gathered information and besieged Pontefract Castle from early June. Marmaduke Langdale raised 4,000 English Royalists and covered the arrival of Hamilton's army.

When Lieutenant General Oliver Cromwell arrived in South Wales on 11 May with 5,000 men of the New Model Army he found the local Parliamentarian forces regaining control. A force of 8,000 ill-armed Royalists had been defeated by a much smaller force under Colonel Thomas Horton on 8 May at the battle of St Fagans. Tenby was besieged by Horton and capitulated on 31 May while Cromwell besieged Pembroke Castle in the far south west on 31 May, hampered by a lack of artillery. As the situation with regards to the siege and the restiveness of the local populace improved, Cromwell despatched cavalry regiments one at a time to march north and reinforce Lambert. Siege guns arrived on 1 July and the castle surrendered on the 11th. Cromwell mopped up and was marching east with more than 4,000 men within a week.

== Prelude ==
Hamilton crossed the border into England on 8 July and joined with Langdale's English Royalists at Carlisle on the 9th. This combined force besieged Appleby Castle while waiting for reinforcements and artillery from Scotland and the arrival of a Scottish corps which had been serving in Ireland. In early August the Royalist army started moving south in stages. By 17 August its advance guard had reached Wigan, but the army was strung out over 50 miles (80 km). Lambert, acting on Cromwell's orders, stood on the defensive until reinforced at Weatherby on 12 August when Cromwell arrived and took command of the combined force. On 13 August Cromwell directed his army westward; Langdale promptly informed Hamilton that the combined Parliamentarian force was bearing down on their east flank, but this warning was largely disregarded.

=== Battle of Preston ===
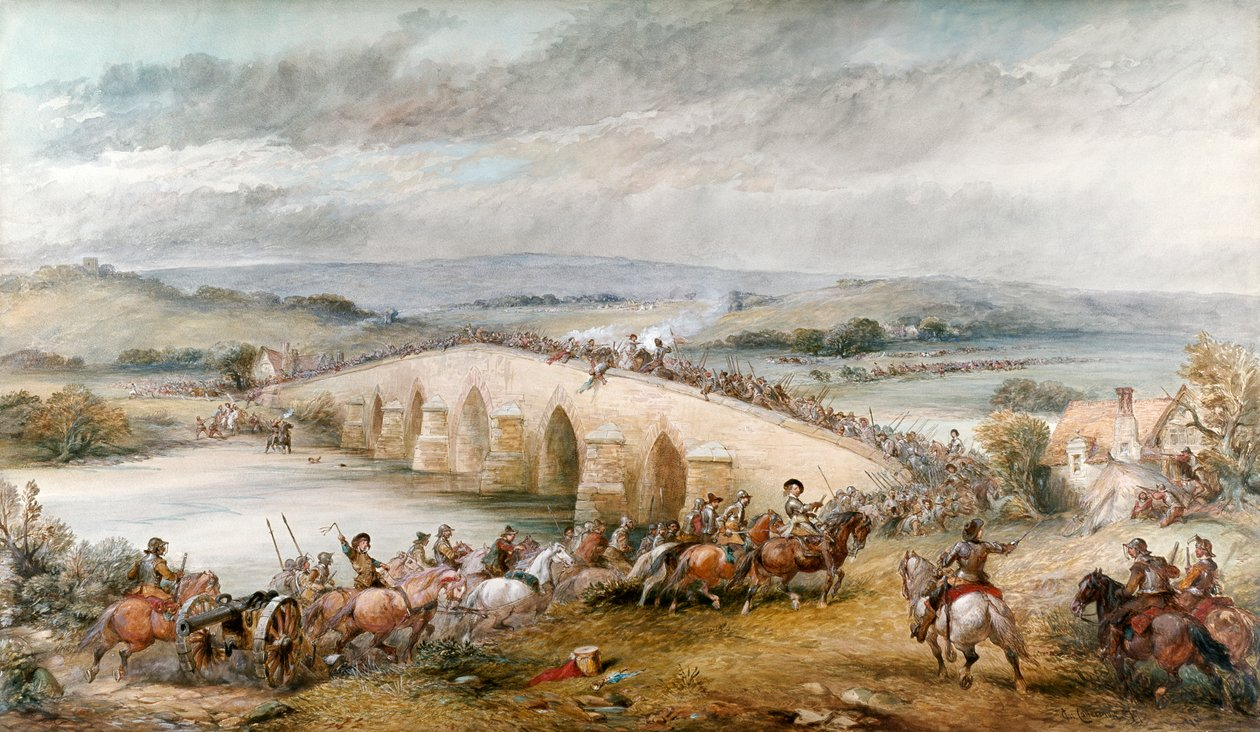
1877 impression of the fight for Preston Bridge

On the morning of 17 August the Scottish infantry, the largest single contingent of the Royalist army, was just to the north of Preston. Langdale's corps of 4,000 men was 8 miles (13 km) north east of Preston and falling back ahead of the Parliamentarian advance scouts. Langdale again warned Hamilton as to the situation and was again ignored. Hamilton concentrated on passing the Scottish infantry over the Ribble bridge while Langdale set up a defensive position north west of Preston. An initial Parliamentarian attack was beaten back and follow up assaults resulted in fierce fighting. After four hours the weight of numbers told and the Parliamentarians broke through. They cut off all the Royalist forces north of the Ribble and brought the bridge under a withering fire. The bridge was strongly defended by 600 Scottish infantry, but the Parliamentarians captured it in two hours of furious fighting, by which time night was falling. Approximately 1,000 Royalists were dead and 4,000 captured by the end of the day.

=== Retreat from Preston ===
The Scottish leaders south of the river held a council of war and decided that the survivors should immediately make their way south, to be well away from Cromwell's force by morning and link up with their main force of cavalry at Wigan. To move as rapidly and stealthily as possible the Scots abandoned their baggage and ammunition trains, only taking with them what each man could carry. The baggage, equipment, artillery and ammunition left behind was supposed to be destroyed once the march was well under way, but it was not and was all captured before daylight.

Discovering that the Scots had left their camp, the Parliamentarians sent a force of cavalry across the bridge and down the road south. Within 3 miles (5 km) they had closed with the few cavalry the Scots were using as a rear guard. Nearly the whole of the mounted contingent of the New Model Army, reinforced by some Lancashire troops, was in pursuit by the next morning, some 2,500 cavalry and dragoons. Their advance guard harried the Scottish cavalry, determined to break through them to force the Royalist infantry to stand and fight. The Scottish cavalry under Middleton, recalled from Wigan, took up a position to hold off the Parliamentarian pursuit. Throughout 18 August the Parliamentarians pressed, so aggressively that in one skirmish the commander of the advance guard was killed. All of the infantry of the New Model Army was now following their mounted comrades, a further 2,900 men. The Parliamentarians were still outnumbered by the surviving Royalists, who in the immediate aftermath of Preston may have numbered as many as 11,000, mostly Scots.

On the evening of 18 August at least a substantial part of the Scottish infantry formed up on Standish Moor north of Wigan, briefly holding off their pursuers. Cromwell reported a hundred prisoners taken outside Wigan. The Scots entered the town, thoroughly plundered it and marched on through the night. Some men had not eaten nor slept for two nights; cavalrymen fell asleep in their saddles. Hungry, cold, soaking wet, exhausted and short of dry powder or matchlock the Scots continued south, leaving bands of stragglers and deserters behind them. Sanderson, who fought at Winwick, wrote of the roads, fields, woods and ditches being littered with the dead from Preston to Warrington.

== Battle ==
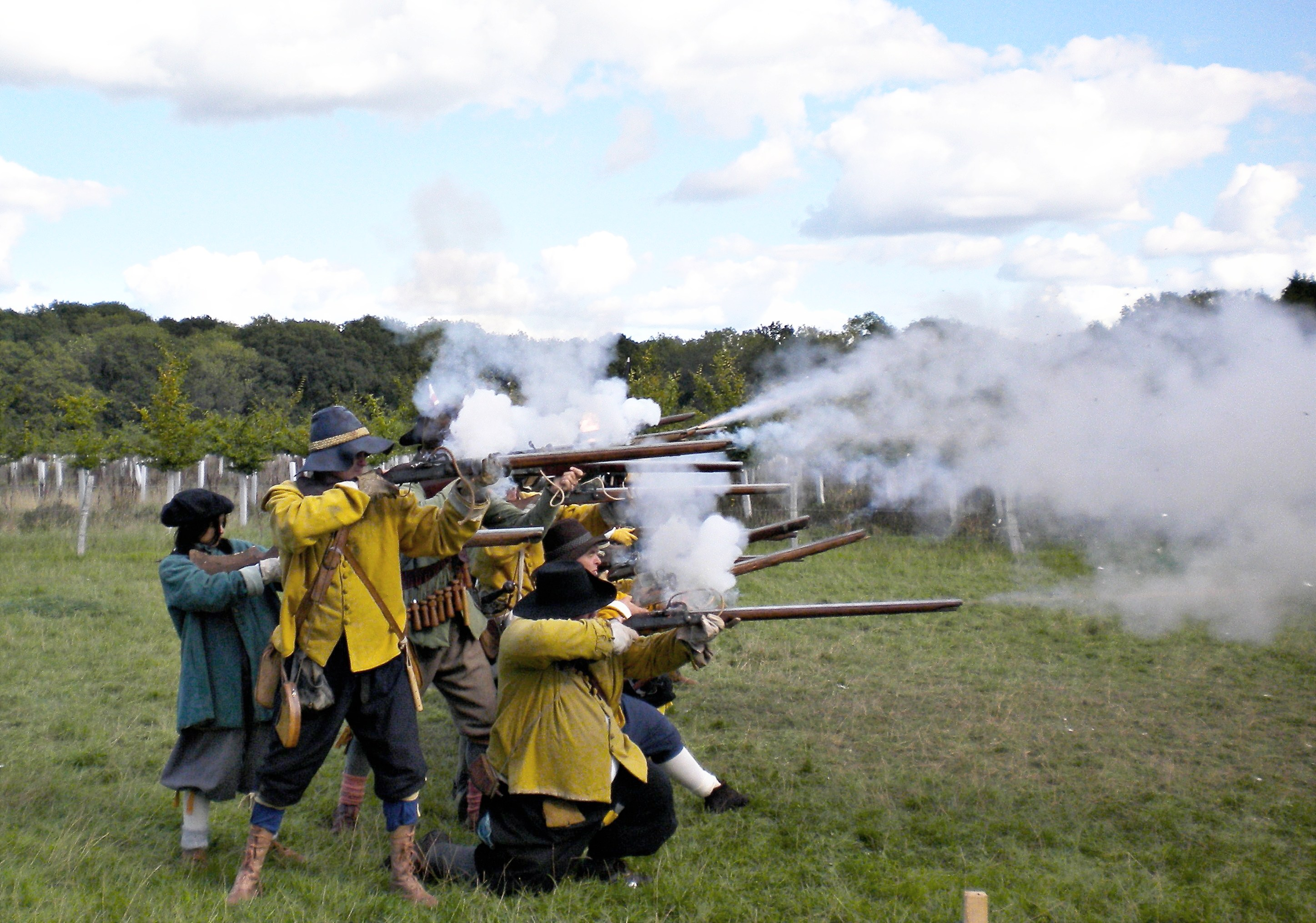
A modern re-enactment of a musket volley of the period

During the morning of 19 August, about 9 miles (14 km) south of Wigan, the Scots halted between the villages of Newton and Winwick. They had found a naturally strong defensive position where the road crossed Hermitage Brook, and they could take defensive advantage of a large bank on the south side of the stream's valley, the "Red Bank", and plentiful hedges. (It is this bank which causes the battle to be sometimes known as Red Bank.) The ground around the ford and the stream valley was very muddy, which would hamper any attack. They prepared for battle, positioning stands of pikemen at the ford and other access points, and lining the hedges above the valley of the stream with musketmen. The cavalry continued to Warrington, 3 miles (5 km) to the south. The plan was for the cavalry to secure the bridge while the infantry gave the Parliamentarian advance guard a rebuff. This would gain enough time for the infantry to cross the bridge – always a dangerous time, when forces were inevitably divided and unable to support each other – covered by the cavalry. Perhaps coordination broke down, for the cavalry crossed the bridge, making it dangerous for the infantry to follow them until the situation had been resolved. The cavalry did barricade the bridge and construct some field fortifications.

English Heritage estimate that the Scots numbered about 4,000–6,000 infantry at the start of the battle; the historian Richard Brooks gives a total of 7,000, including the cavalry, who were not engaged. The Parliamentarians were pursuing with nearly all of the New Model Army, supplemented by some local troops: approximately 2,500 cavalry and dragoons and 2,900 infantry for a total of some 5,400–5,500 men. The Parliamentarian pursuers rode up the road – their horses were exhausted and unable to manage more than a walk – and in the words of Hodgson the Scots "snaffled our forlorn [advance guard], and put them to retreat". Heath writes of them "having lost abundance of men".

A lengthy pause followed as the weary Parliamentarian mounted troops waited for some of their infantry to catch up. Once they arrived they attempted to storm the Scottish positions in a push of the pike, led by Pride's Regiment, but were initially repulsed. More Parliamentarian infantry arrived and the assault was renewed; fierce fighting continued for more than three hours, with repeated Parliamentarian charges and prolonged close-quarter fighting between the opposing pike formations. Colonel Thomas Pride distinguished himself leading his regiment in this fighting, but the Parliamentarians were unable to dislodge the Scots. The modern historian Trevor Royle says "Both sides fought with equal ferocity and determination". Cromwell's account accepts that several Parliamentarian pike attacks were thrown back and talks of his troops "charging very hard upon them [the Scots]".

By now the Scottish musketmen had run out of gunpowder, partly because of having abandoned their baggage train at Preston and partly because the persistent heavy rain dampened many powder flasks. Cannonballs are reported as having been recovered from the site, indicating that at least some artillery was employed. The Scots are believed to have marched south with as many as 20 easily portable pieces of light artillery to supplement the fire of their musketmen although Parliamentarian accounts claim that these were all captured when the Scots abandoned their baggage train after the battle of Preston. The Parliamentarian infantry fell back and their cavalry and some skirmishing dragoons held the Scots in place – if they had attempted to retreat the cavalry would have attacked them in their rear.

During this hiatus the Parliamentarian infantry took a circuitous route to the east behind woods and in dead ground to emerge on the flank and rear of the Scots. Sanderson, who was there, has local people telling the Parliamentarians the best route by which to outflank the Scots. At about the time the Parliamentarians emerged some Scottish cavalry returned from Warrington, but the sight of the enemy emerging on their right flank was too much for the exhausted Scots. The Scottish infantry broke and fled before the Parliamentarians contacted them. About half routed towards Winwick and 300 Parliamentarian cavalry followed, cutting down many. The Scots discarded their weapons and crowded into the village church, where they were taken prisoner. Seeing that the battle was lost, the Scottish cavalry force withdrew back to Warrington. The rest of the Scottish infantry, fewer than 2,600 men, followed them, hard pressed by the Parliamentarians. Stragglers and wounded were attacked and killed by local people. The fighting at Winwick cost the Scots 1,000 killed and 2,000 taken prisoner.

When the Scottish infantry reached Warrington late on 19 August they discovered that their cavalry and their commander had abandoned them. Hamilton left a message saying they would "preserve themselves for a better time" and ordering the infantry to surrender on the best terms they could get. The commander of the infantry, Lieutenant General William Baillie, was at such a loss that he turned to his staff and "beseeched any that would to shoot him through the head". Warrington bridge was barricaded and terms of surrender were sought. Cromwell took them prisoner, sparing their lives and their immediate personal possessions. Cromwell declared the victory at Winwick to be "nothing but the hand of God".

=== Pursuit ===
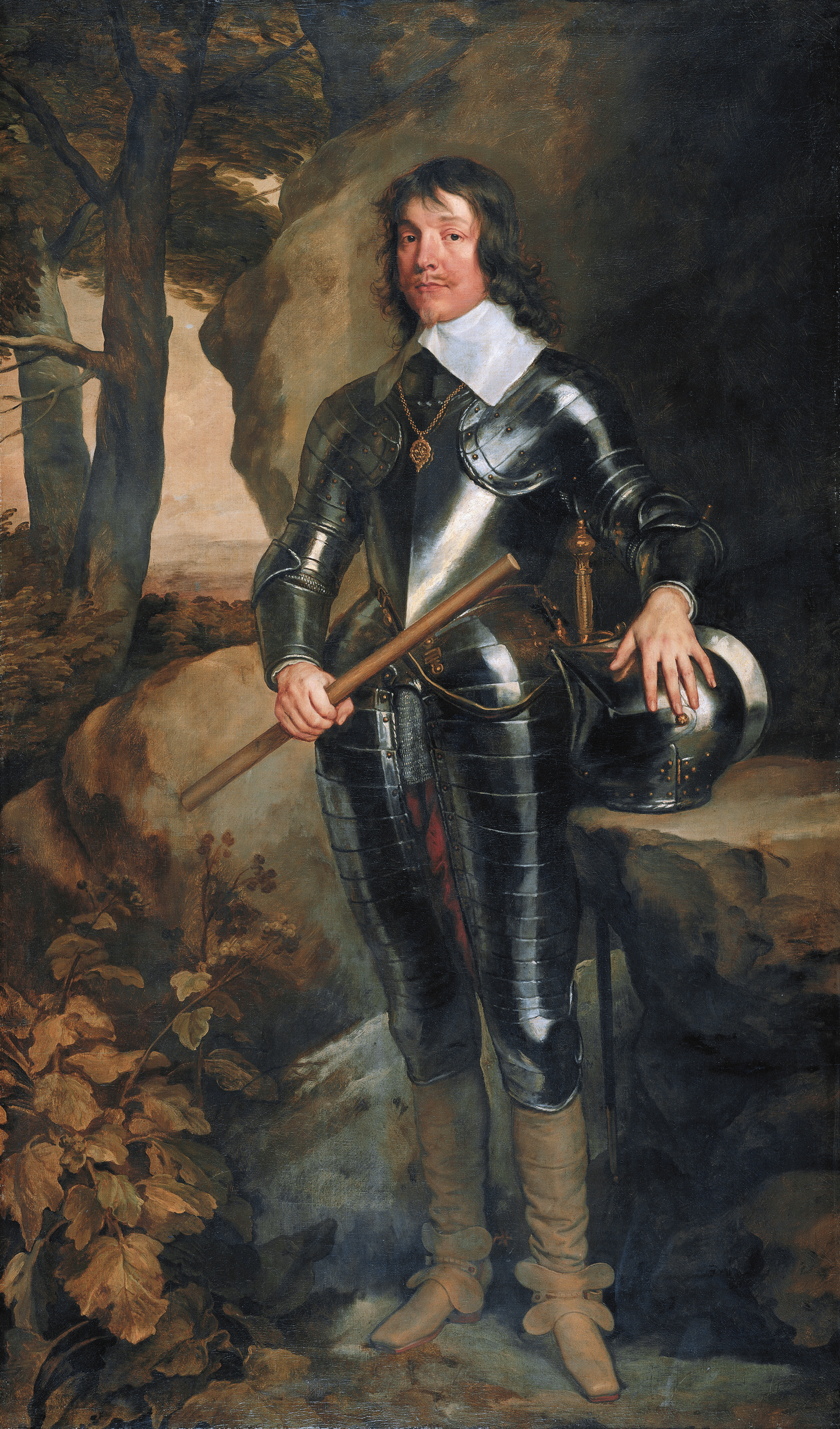
James Hamilton, Marquess of Hamilton

Approximately 2,500–3,000 mounted Scots headed south. They dispersed a force of militia at Whitchurch and turned east for Stone, hoping to later turn north and make for Pontefract Castle; which was still held by Royalists and from where they may have been able to return to Scotland. Discipline collapsed: troopers, even officers, deserted; one trooper shot his sergeant and was himself executed. Local militia repeatedly attacked, one group capturing the commander of the Scottish cavalry, the Earl of Middleton. The weather continued to be wet and stormy. At Uttoxeter on the morning of 24 August the Scots refused to march. A handful of the senior officers left, some of whom made their way to safety. Hamilton was too sick to move and surrendered on terms to the still pursuing Parliamentarians. The prisoners, excepting the senior commanders, were promised their lives and their clothes, they were not to be beaten, the sick and wounded would be treated locally and Hamilton was allowed six servants.

=== Casualties ===
Numbers of casualties are difficult to calculate. Modern historians accept that approximately 1,000 Royalists were killed at Preston and 4,000 taken prisoner. During the retreat from Preston and at Winwick and its aftermath approximately a further 1,000 Royalists are believed to have died. About 2,000 Scots were captured at Winwick – contemporary estimates vary widely – and a further 2,600 at Warrington. The capture of Hamilton and the cavalry with him – possibly as many as 3,000 – completed the annihilation of the Royalist army. Again neither contemporary nor modern estimates agree. Those prisoners who had served voluntarily, as opposed to being conscripted, were sold as slaves: to work the land in the Americas or as galley slaves to Venice. Hamilton was beheaded for treason in March 1649.

The English Parliament announced that their losses during the whole campaign had been 100 or fewer killed. Cromwell declined to quantify the loss, but did speak of "many" wounded. A Parliamentary casualty figure of 100 is widely given by modern historians; Bull and Seed are sceptical and estimate that in excess of 500 were killed or wounded.

== Aftermath ==
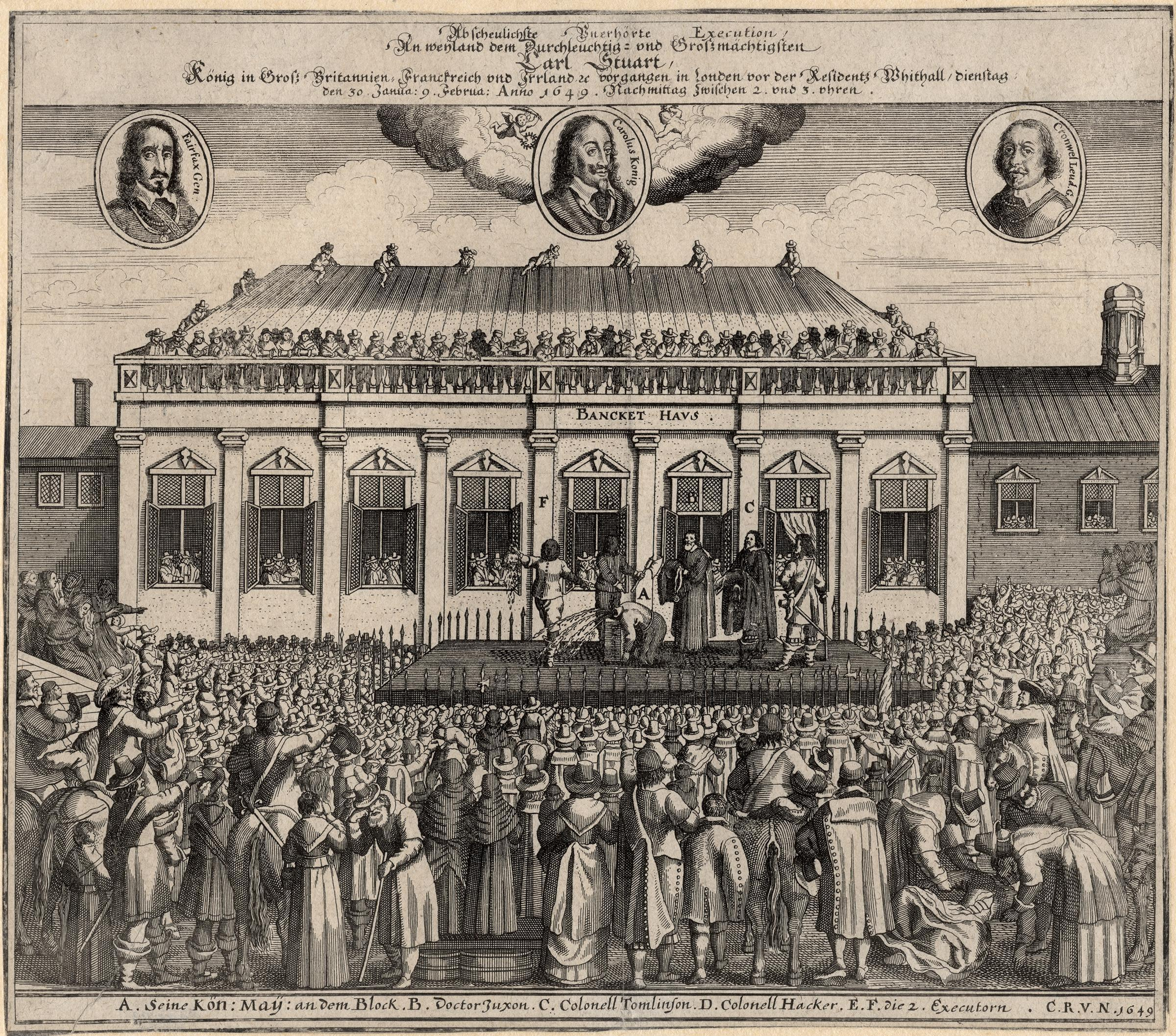
Contemporary German print of the execution of Charles I

The Battle of Winwick was the last battle of the Second English Civil War. Hearing of the outcome of Winwick, Colchester surrendered to Fairfax on 27 August 1648 on harsh terms. This effectively ended the war, although Pontefract held out until 22 March the following year.

The rout of the Engager army led to further political upheaval in Scotland and the faction opposed to the Engagement was able to gain control of the government, with the assistance of a group of English Parliamentarian cavalry led by Cromwell. Exasperated by the duplicity of Charles I and by the English Parliament's refusal to stop negotiating with him and accept the demands of the New Model Army, the Army purged Parliament and established the Rump Parliament, which appointed a High Court of Justice to try Charles I for treason against the English people. He was convicted and on 30 January 1649 beheaded. On 19 May, with the establishment of the Commonwealth of England, the country became a republic.

The Scottish Parliament, which had not been consulted before the King's execution, declared his son Charles II, King of Britain. Charles II set sail to Scotland, landing on 23 June 1650 and the Scottish Parliament set about rapidly recruiting an army to support the new king. The leaders of the English Commonwealth felt threatened by the Scots reassembling an army and the New Model Army, led by Cromwell, invaded Scotland on 22 July. After 14 months of hard fighting Scotland was largely subjugated and a Scottish counter-invasion was crushed at the Battle of Worcester. Charles was one of the few to escape, into exile on the continent.

The defeated Scottish government was dissolved and the English Parliament absorbed the kingdom of Scotland into the Commonwealth. Military rule was imposed, with 10,000 English troops garrisoned across the country to quell the threat of local uprisings. After in-fighting between factions in the English Parliament and the army, Cromwell ruled over the Commonwealth as Lord Protector from December 1653 until his death in September 1658. On 3 February the dominant army faction, under Lieutenant General George Monck, called new parliamentary elections. These resulted in the Convention Parliament which on 8 May 1660 declared that Charles II had reigned as the lawful monarch since the execution of Charles I. Charles II returned from exile and was crowned king of England on 23 April 1661, (Note: He had been crowned King of Scotland twelve years earlier on 1 January 1651 at Scone, the traditional place of coronation for Scottish monarchs.) completing the Restoration.

== Battlefield today ==
The site of the battle was listed by Historic England on the Register of Historic Battlefields on 31 January 2018. It is one of only 47 English battlefields accorded the status of being the location of an "engagement of national significance". It is noted to be "the only English battlefield of the Second Civil War which remains in a good state of preservation." The site of the battle and the "Red Bank" have been shown on Ordnance Survey maps since 1849. At the time of the battle the area was moorland and rough grazing with wooded, marshy valleys. Farming and mining activities, and work on the Wigan to Warrington road, have considerably altered the lie of the land; there has also been housing development around the fringes of the site, especially to the south. Nevertheless, the line of the Hermitage Brook and the barrier of the Red Bank on the south side of Hermitage Green Lane can still be clearly seen.

== Notes, citations and sources ==
=== Sources ===
- Baker, Anthony (1986) [1986]. A Battlefield Atlas of the English Civil War. London: Promotional Reprint. ISBN 978-1-85648-334-6.
- Braddick, Michael (2009). God's Fury, England's Fire: A New History of the English Civil Wars. London: Penguin UK. ISBN 978-0-14-100897-4.
- Brooks, Richard (2005). Cassell's Battlefields of Britain and Ireland. London: Weidenfeld & Nicolson. ISBN 978-0-304-36333-9.
- Bull, Stephen; Seed, Mike (1998). Bloody Preston: The Battle of Preston, 1648. Lancaster: Carnegie. ISBN 978-1-85936-041-5.
- Dow, F. D. (1979). Cromwellian Scotland 1651–1660. Edinburgh: John Donald Publishers Ltd. ISBN 978-0-85976-049-2.
- Ffoulkes, Charles John & Hopkinson, Edward Campbell (2013) [1938]. Sword, Lance & Bayonet: a Record of the Arms of the British Army & Navy. Cambridge: Cambridge University Press. ISBN 978-1-107-67015-0.
- Furgol, Edward (2002). "The Civil Wars in Scotland". In Kenyon, John & Ohlmeyer, Jane (eds.). The Civil Wars: A Military History of England, Scotland and Ireland 1638–1660. Oxford: Oxford University Press. pp. 41–72. ISBN 978-0-19-280278-1.
- Gaunt, Peter (1991). A Nation Under Siege: The Civil War in Wales, 1642–48. London: Cadw, Welsh Historic Monuments. ISBN 978-0-11-701222-6.
- Gentles, Ian (2002). "The Civil Wars in England". In Kenyon, John & Ohlmeyer, Jane (eds.). The Civil Wars: A Military History of England, Scotland and Ireland 1638–1660. Oxford: Oxford University Press. pp. 103–154. ISBN 978-0-19-280278-1.
- Hannay, David (1911). "Pride, Thomas" . In Chisholm, Hugh (ed.). Encyclopædia Britannica. Vol. 22 (11th ed.). Cambridge University Press. p. 315. OCLC 1121218253.
- "Battle of Winwick (also known as Battle of Red Bank) 1648". Historic England. 2023.
- "Registered Battlefields". Historic England. 2023.
- Keeble, N. H. (2002). The Restoration: England in the 1660s. Oxford: Blackwell. ISBN 978-0-631-19574-0.
- Kenyon, John & Ohlmeyer, Jane (2002). "The Background to the Civil Wars in the Stuart Kingdoms". In Kenyon, John & Ohlmeyer, Jane (eds.). The Civil Wars: A Military History of England, Scotland and Ireland 1638–1660. Oxford: Oxford University Press. pp. 3–40. ISBN 978-0-19-280278-1.
- Lodge, Richard (1969). The History of England – From the Restoration to the Death of William III (1660–1702). New York: Greenwood. OCLC 59117818.
- MacKenzie, Kirsteen (2009). "Oliver Cromwell and the Solemn League and Covenant of the Three Kingdoms". In Little, Patrick (ed.). Oliver Cromwell: New Perspectives. Basingstoke: Palgrave Macmillan. ISBN 978-0-230-57421-2.
- Reese, Peter (2006). Cromwell's Masterstroke: The Battle of Dunbar 1650. Barnsley: Pen & Sword. ISBN 978-1-84415-179-0.
- Reid, Stuart (2008) [2004]. Dunbar 1650: Cromwell's Most Famous Victory. Oxford: Osprey Publishing. ISBN 978-1-84176-774-1.
- Rodwell, Warwick (2013). The Coronation Chair and Stone of Scone: History, Archaeology and Conservation. Oxford: Oxbow Books. ISBN 978-1-78297-153-5.
- Royle, Trevor (2005) [2004]. Civil War: The Wars of the Three Kingdoms, 1638–1660. London: Abacus. ISBN 978-0-349-11564-1.
- Sherwood, Roy Edward (1997). Oliver Cromwell: King In All But Name, 1653–1658. New York: St Martin's Press. ISBN 978-0-7509-1066-8.
- Stewart, Laura A. M. (2016). Rethinking the Scottish Revolution. Oxford: Oxford University Press. ISBN 978-0-19-871844-4.
- Wanklyn, Malcolm (2014) [2006]. Decisive Battles of the English Civil War. Barnsley: Pen & Sword. ISBN 978-1-78346-975-8.
- Wheeler, James Scott (2002). The Irish and British Wars 1637–1654: Triumph, Tragedy and Failure. London: Routledge. ISBN 978-0-415-22132-0.
- Woolrych, Austin (2002). Britain in Revolution 1625–1660. Oxford: Oxford University Press. ISBN 978-0-19-820081-9.
- Young, John R. (1996). The Scottish Parliament 1649–1661: A Political and Constitutional Analysis. Edinburgh: John Donald Publishers. ISBN 978-0-85976-412-4.
