= Listed buildings in Winwick, Cheshire =

Winwick is a village and civil parish in the Borough of Warrington in Cheshire, England, north of the town of Warrington. Within the boundaries of the historic county of Lancashire, it contains 16 buildings that are recorded in the National Heritage List for England as designated listed buildings. The parish is partly residential and partly rural. The listed buildings include two churches, a holy well, two milestones, and a mounting block. The other structures are houses, farms, or buildings related to them.

== Key ==
Grade	Criteria
Grade I	Buildings of exceptional interest, sometimes considered to be internationally important.
Grade II*	Particularly important buildings of more than special interest.
Grade II	Buildings of national importance and special interest.

== Buildings ==
Name and location	Photograph	Date	Notes	Grade
St Oswald's Church; 53.4308°N 2.5979°W		Early 13th century	Additions and alterations have been made over the centuries, including the rebuilding of the chancel, sanctuary and vestry by A. W. N. Pugin in 1847–49, and the rebuilding of the spire and restoration of the church in 1869 by Paley and Austin. The church is constructed in sandstone, and has a west tower. Many of the furnishings were designed by Pugin. Inside the church is the cross-arm of an Anglo-Saxon preaching cross dating from around 750.	I
Church House Farmhouse; 53.4305°N 2.5969°W	—	Early 17th century	The house probably has a timber-framed core, and some timber framing is still present in the internal walls. It is in two storeys, and was later pebbledashed. The roofs are partly slated, and partly tiled. Inside the house are beams, an inglenook, oak panelling, and stone fireplaces.	II
Lower Alder Root Farmhouse; 53.4306°N 2.6147°W	—	Early 17th century (probable)	The building has been altered and extended, and is entirely pebbledashed with a slate roof. The main features of interest are inside the house, in particular the 16-panelled ceiling in the front parlour, with moulded beams.	II
Arbury Farmhouse; 53.4283°N 2.5884°W	—	1641	The farmhouse was altered and extended in the 18th and 19th centuries. It is constructed in brick with sandstone quoins. The windows are casements. Inside the house are beams, and formerly there were back-to-back inglenooks.	II
Myddleton Hall Farmhouse; 53.4314°N 2.5741°W	—	1656	The farmhouse was later extended. It is in brick with stone quoins. The original part has three storeys with a stone-slate roof; the later extension is in two storeys with a slate roof. The windows are mainly casements, with one horizontally sliding sash window. Inside the house are beams, an inglenook, and a dog-leg staircase.	II
Myddleton Hall; 53.4321°N 2.5734°W	—	1658	A brick country house standing on a sandstone plinth with sandstone dressings. It is in two storeys and consists of a hall with two cross wings, and another right wing. The windows are mullioned and/or transomed. Some of the 19th-century additions have been demolished.	II*
Manor House; 53.4315°N 2.5970°W	—	1717 or earlier	The house was extended and altered in the 19th century. It is in rendered brick with a slate roof. The house has two storeys with attics, and has sash windows. The main doorway has a Doric doorcase with pilasters and a voussoired keystone under a pediment. Internal features include stone cellars, beams and a dog-leg staircase.	II
Barn, Woodhead Farmhouse; 53.4437°N 2.5924°W	—	18th century (probable)	A brick building with stone dressings and a slate roof, and a wing added later. It is in five bays, and has diamond-shaped ventilation holes.	II
Woodhead Farmhouse; 53.4434°N 2.5921°W	—	Late 18th century (probable)	A brick farmhouse standing on a stone plinth with stone dressings and quoins and slate roofs. The building has four bays, the end bay being recessed. Most of the bays have three storeys, with the end bay in two storeys. The windows are mullioned and transomed. The entrance door has a Gibbs surround.	II
Ivy House; 53.4317°N 2.5762°W	—	c. 1840	This is a brick house, painted white, with a hipped slate roof. It is a symmetrical house in two storeys, with a single-storey single-room wing to the left. The windows are casements.	II
Former canal stables 53.4211°N 2.6099°W		1841	Formerly associated with the now-closed Sankey Canal, this is a brick building with a slate roof. Its features include archways of various types, stable windows, and horseshoe-shaped pitch holes.	II
Milestone, Newton Road; 53.43316°N 2.60128°W	—	Mid-19th century or earlier	A stone milestone on the west side of the A49 road. It has a round front and a straight back, and is surmounted by a half-dome. It is inscribed with the distances to Wigan and Warrington.	II
Mounting block 53.42984°N 2.59744°W		1860	A mounting block located on Swan Green at the intersection of the A49 and A573 roads. It is formed from a monolithic piece of sandstone, and has retained a clear inscription.	II
Milestone, Golbourne Road; 53.43188°N 2.59752°W		Late 19th century	A stone milestone on the west side of the A573 road. It is triangular with a sloping top, and is inscribed with the distances to Wigan and Warrington.	II
Roman Catholic Church, Winwick Hospital; 53.4299°N 2.6023°W		c. 1900	A Roman Catholic Church built to serve the former Winwick Psychiatric Hospital, possibly designed by Synott, Synott and Powell. It is constructed in brick with stone dressings and has Westmorland slate roofs. Its design is an Arts and Crafts interpretation of the Perpendicular style. The church has an apsidal chancel, and an eastern bellcote and stair tower. Since being declared redundant it has been used as a nursery.	II
St Oswald's Well; 53.44218°N 2.59248°W	—	Unknown	A holy well on the supposed site where Saint Oswald was killed at the Battle of Maserfield. It consists of a square stone chamber with three steps on its south side. A stone slab partly covers its aperture. The well is also a scheduled monument.	II
