= Winwick, Cheshire =

Village in Cheshire, England

Coordinates: 53°25′49″N 2°35′50″W

Winwick
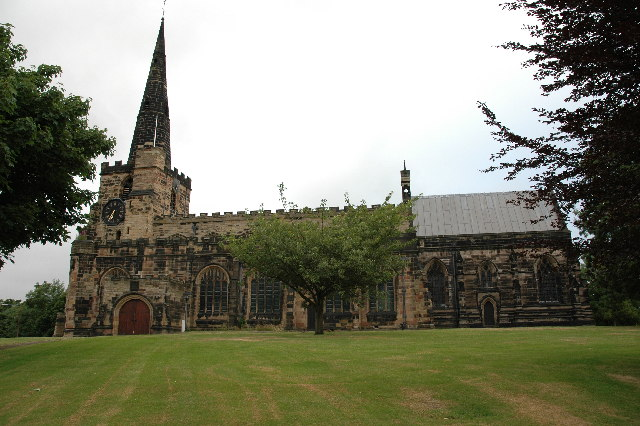
- St Oswald's Church, Winwick

- Location within Cheshire
- Population: 4,899 (2021 census)
- OS grid reference: SJ603928
- Civil parish: Winwick
- Unitary authority: Warrington
- Ceremonial county: Cheshire
- Region: North West
- Country: England
- Sovereign state: United Kingdom
- Post town: Warrington
- Postcode district: WA2
- Dialling code: 01925
- Police: Cheshire
- Fire: Cheshire
- Ambulance: North West
- UK Parliament: Warrington North

Winwick is a village and civil parish in the Borough of Warrington, Cheshire, England. Located within the historic boundaries of Lancashire, it is situated about 3 miles (4.8 km) north of Warrington town centre, nearby is junction 22 of the M6 motorway and junction 9 of the M62. Winwick borders Newton-le-Willows and Burtonwood. At the 2021 census, the village had a population of 2,060, while the wider civil parish had a population of 4,899.

Winwick Hospital, a large Victorian mental asylum, closed down in 1997. A smaller hospital called Hollins Park is currently situated on the site. Hollins Park Hospital is also the headquarters for North West Boroughs Healthcare NHS Foundation Trust.

== History ==
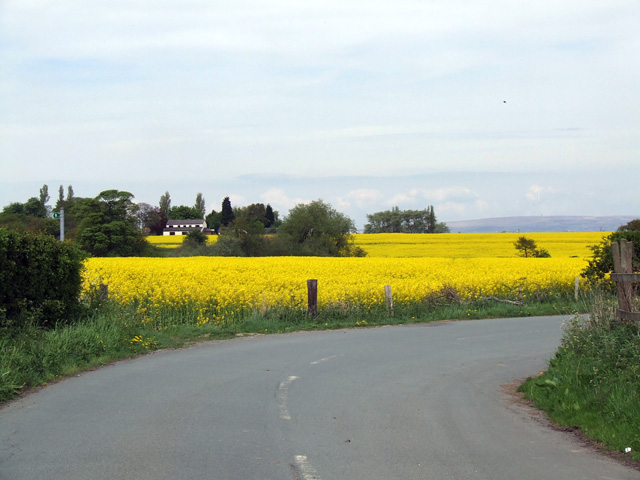
An oilseed rape field in Winwick

King Oswald of Northumbria is believed to have been killed in the Winwick area and the parish church, dedicated to him, was reputedly located with guidance from the "Winwick Pig", a carving of which can still be seen on the church wall. Richard Sherlock was the incumbent at Winwick for some thirty years in the seventeenth century, and Thomas Wilson, Bishop of Sodor and Man, spent his early years in the care of Sherlock at Winwick.

At the time of the Domesday Survey (1086), the village itself was also known as St Oswalds. This was little more than four hundred years after the death of Oswald. In the church, the remains of a 7th-century stone cross with an engraving of the reputed demise of Oswald can be seen.

Winwick was the site of the battle of Winwick in the second English Civil War on 19 August 1648, where Oliver Cromwell defeated a mainly Scottish Royalist army.

The captain of the RMS Titanic, Edward Smith, married Sarah Eleanor Pennington on 13 January 1887 at St Oswald's Church.

In the 1934 Winwick rail crash 11 people were killed and 19 people were injured. Another accident occurred in 1967, but there were no fatalities or serious injuries.

== Demographics ==
At the 2021 census, the civil parish had a population of 4,899 people in 2,006 households. The Office for National Statistics also defines a built-up area for Winwich, which excludes outlying parts of the parish, including areas south of the M62 on the periphery of the Warrington built-up area; this had a population of 2,060 in 2021.

Census population of Winwick parish
Census	Population	Female	Male	Households	Source
2001	4,366	2,261	2,105	1,744	
2011	4,968	2,539	2,429	1,975	
2021	4,899	2,548	2,351	2,006	

== Sport ==
Winwick Athletic F.C. is a junior football club. Initially an FA Charter Standard Development Club from 2006, it won the FA Charter Standard National Club of the Year Award in 2009. In January 2013, Winwick Athletic became an FA Charter Standard Community Club, which is the highest level possible for an FA Grassroots Football Club, and, as of 2014, was a Nike Partner Club.

== Notable people ==
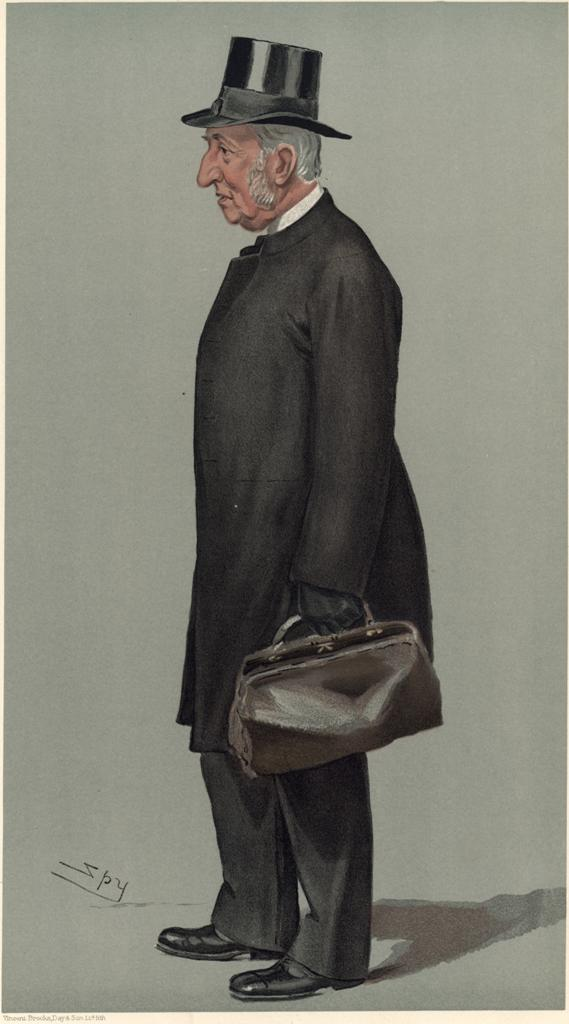
Caricature of "The Head" (J.J.Hornby) in Vanity Fair, 1901

- Thomas Hazlehurst (1779–1842), businessman, founded the soap and alkali company, Hazlehurst & Sons in Runcorn
- Phipps Hornby (1785–1867), Royal Navy admiral.
- Thomas Legh Claughton (1808–1892), academic, poet, and clergyman.
- Henry Cadman Jones (1818–1902), an English law reporter.
- Geoffrey Hornby (1825–1895), Royal Navy Admiral of the Fleet.
- James John Hornby (1826–1909), an English rower and headmaster of Eton College from 1868 to 1884.
- John Maines (born 1948), musician, trombone player, brass band conductor, tutor, compere and concert presenter.

== See also ==
- Listed buildings in Winwick, Cheshire
