= St Oswald's Church, Winwick =

Coordinates: 53.4308°N 2.5979°W

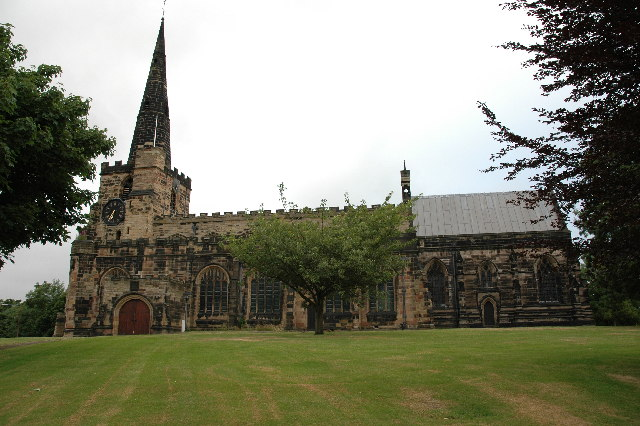
- St Oswald's Church, Winwick, from the south

- Location in Cheshire
- OS grid reference: SJ 604,928
- Location: Winwick, Cheshire
- Country: England
- Denomination: Anglican
- Website: St Oswald's Winwick

History
- Status: Parish church
- Dedication: St Oswald

Architecture
- Functional status: Active
- Heritage designation: Grade I
- Designated: 9 August 1966
- Architect(s): A. W. N. Pugin (1847–49); Paley and Austin (1869); Henry Paley (1931–34)
- Architectural type: Church
- Style: Gothic, Gothic Revival
- Completed: 1849

Specifications
- Materials: Sandstone

Administration
- Province: York
- Diocese: Liverpool
- Archdeaconry: Warrington
- Deanery: Winwick
- Parish: Winwick

Clergy
- Rector: Revd Canon June L. Steventon

St Oswald's Church, is in the village of Winwick, Cheshire, England. The church is recorded in the National Heritage List for England as a designated Grade I listed building. It is an active Anglican parish church in the diocese of Liverpool, the archdeaconry of Warrington and the deanery of Winwick.

== History ==
A church at Winwick is recorded in the Domesday Book of 1086. The earliest parts of the present church are the bases of the north arcade which date from the early 13th century, and the walls of the Legh Chapel and the organ chamber which are dated 1330. The west tower was built in 1358, and the walls and north arcade of the nave (except for the Legh Chapel and the organ chamber) date from 1580. Much damage was done to the church in 1648 when Oliver Cromwell stationed his troops in the church after the Battle of Red Bank. The south porch was added in 1720, and the south arcade of the nave was rebuilt in 1836 reusing earlier stones. The chancel, sanctuary and vestry were rebuilt by Pugin in 1847–49 for the 13th Earl of Derby. The spire was rebuilt and the church was restored in 1869 by the Lancaster partnership of Paley and Austin. On Thursday 13 January 1887, Titanic Captain Edward Smith married Sarah Eleanor Pennington in the church. In 1931–32 Henry Paley successor in the Lancaster architectural practice, now known as Austin and Paley, restored the tower at a cost of £463, and in 1934 he added a new vestry, porch and entrance at a cost of £232.

== Architecture ==
=== Exterior ===
The church is built of sandstone with a metal, stainless steel, roof. Its plan consists of a west tower, a nave of six bays with a clerestory, north and south aisles, a south porch, a chapel in the east bay of each aisle, a chancel and sanctuary of three bays, and a north vestry. The south chapel is the Legh Chapel and the north chapel belonged to the Gerard family. The tower is in three stages and has a recessed spire. On the west face is a door above which is a three-light window. On each side of the window are niches containing restored statues of Saints Anthony and Oswald. To the right of Saint Anthony is a carved pig. On the west and east sides are clock faces. Above these are two-light bell openings; the parapet is crenellated. The parapet of the north aisle is plain; that of the south aisle is crenellated. On the west gable of the chancel is a bellcote.

The south wall was rebuilt during the early part of the 16th century, and a tribute to St. Oswald was engraved in Latin along the cornice. A translation by William Beamont appears in "A History of Winwick" :

"This place of yore did Oswald greatly love, Northumbria's king, but now a saint above: Who in Marcelde's field fighting fall, O, blest one hear ! when here on thee we call.

In fifteen hundred and just three times ten, Sclater restored and built this wall again, And Henry Johnson here was curate then."

=== Interior ===
The nave and aisles have camber beam panelled oak roofs dated 1711. The Legh Chapel has a 16th-century panelled roof. In the Legh Chapel is a brass to Sir Peter Legh and his wife Ellen dated 1527. This is the only known English monumental brass to combine the military and the sacred. It shows the "Knight and Priest" in clerical vestments worn over armour, with his sword by his side. Also in the chapel are monuments to other members of the Legh family, including one to Mrs Ellen Legh who died in 1831 by R. J. Wyatt. In the Gerrard Chapel is a damaged font dating from around 1400, and a brass to Peter Gerard who died in 1495. Beneath the floor of this chapel is the family vault but this has not been used since the Reformation. At the east end is a communion table dated 1725. On the north wall is an aumbry. On a window-ledge in the Gerard Chapel is the cross-arm of an Anglo-Saxon preaching cross dating from around 750. The pews, furnishings and glass in the chancel and sanctuary were designed by Pugin. The timber screen between the nave and the tower was erected in 1920 as a First World War memorial. The organ was built around 1838, probably by Rushworth and Dreaper of Liverpool. Since then Rushworth and Dreaper have made various additions. There is a ring of six bells. Five of these were cast from the four existing bells in 1711 by Richard Sanders, and the sixth in 1882 is by John Taylor and Company.

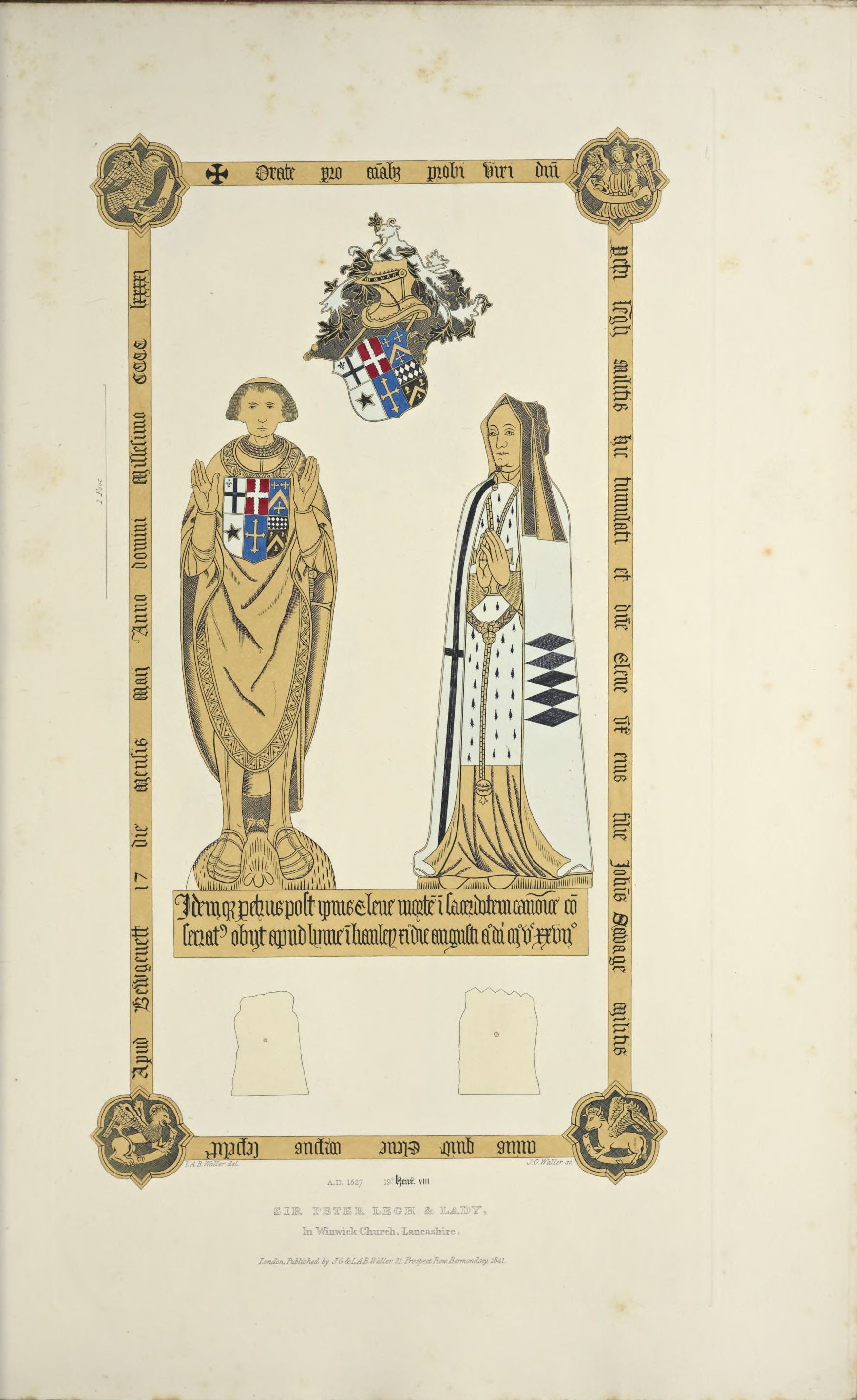
Memorial brass to Sir Peter and Dame Ellen Legh

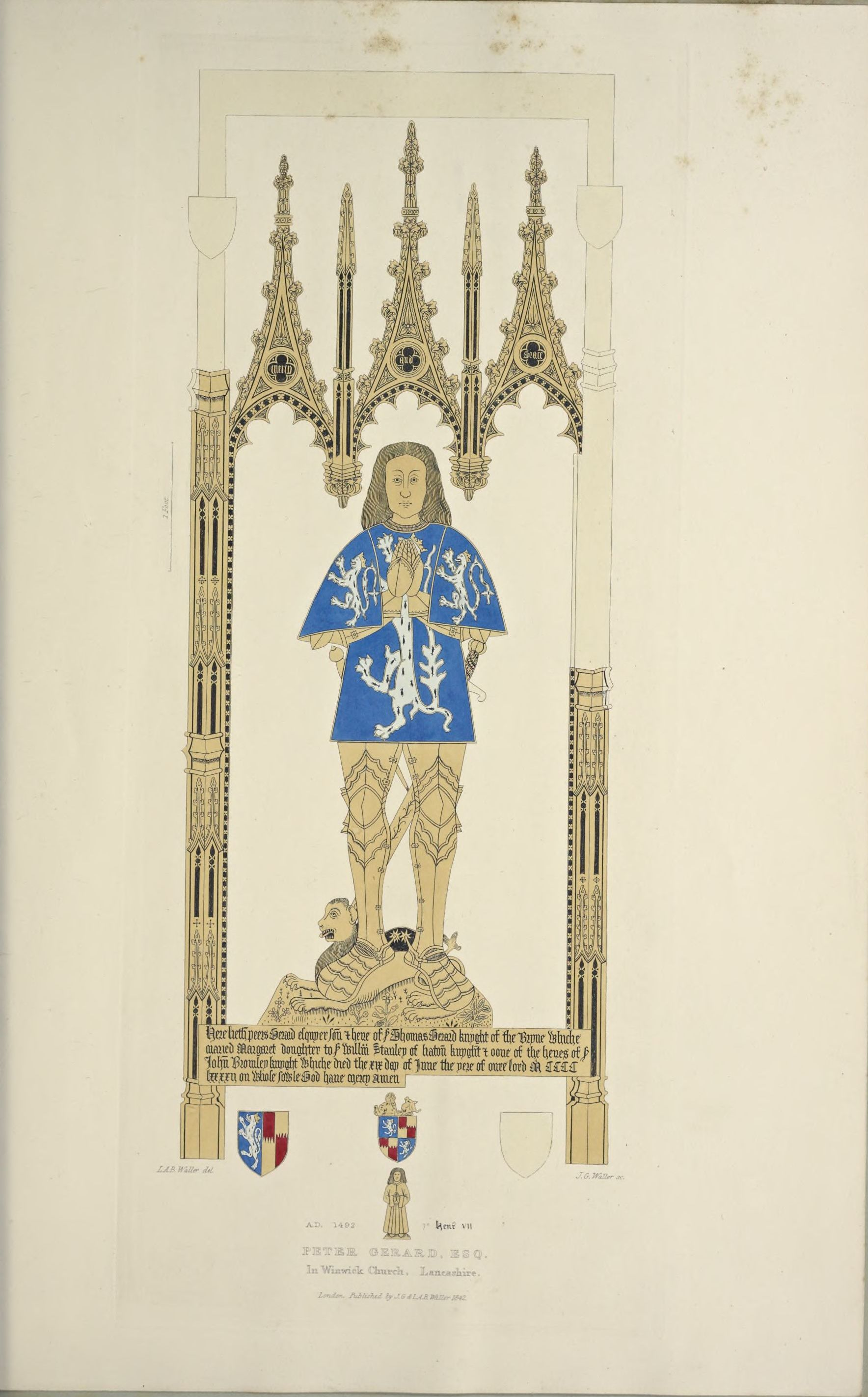
Memorial brass to Peter Gerard

== Churchyard ==
Two soldiers of World War I who were buried in the churchyard are commemorated by special memorial erected by the Commonwealth War Graves Commission.

== St Oswald's Well ==
About 1 mile (1.6 km) to the north of the church in a field alongside the A573 road between Winwick and Golborne at Hermitage Green is a holy well dedicated to St Oswald (grid reference SJ607941). It is lined with medieval stonework and is covered by a protective stone slab. The well is a scheduled monument, and is listed at Grade II.

== See also ==
- Grade I and II* listed buildings in Warrington
- Grade I listed churches in Cheshire
- Scheduled Monuments in Cheshire (1066–1539)
- Listed buildings in Winwick, Cheshire
- List of ecclesiastical works by Paley and Austin
- List of ecclesiastical works by Austin and Paley (1916–44)
- Richard Sherlock
- John Blackburne
