= Carlos Caballero =

Carlos Caballero may refer to:

- Carlos José Caballero (1917–1963), Argentinian politician
- Carlos Caballero (Spanish footballer) (born 1984), Spanish football midfielder
- Carlos Caballero (Honduran footballer) (born 1958), Honduran footballer and manager
- Carlos Caballero (weightlifter) (born 1927), Colombian weightlifter

== See also ==
- Caballero (surname)
