= Caballero (surname) =

Caballero, a common surname deriving from the Spanish word caballero, meaning "knight", "gentleman", or "vaquero"; can refer to:

== Academics ==
- Alberto Caballero (astronomer), Spanish astronomer
- Francis Caballero, French lawyer and academic
- Manuel Caballero, Venezuelan historian
- María Emilia Caballero, Mexican mathematician
- Pino Caballero Gil (born 1968), Spanish computer scientist
- Ricardo J. Caballero, Chilean economist

== Clergy ==
- Félix Caballero, Dominican priest
- Juan Caballero y Ocio, priest

== Performers ==
- Elizabeth Caballero, Cuban-American soprano
- Eula Caballero, Filipina actress
- Flavio Caballero, Colombian actor
- Jordi Caballero, Spanish actor
- Jorge Caballero (actor), Mexican actor
- Roxann Caballero (born 1958), American actress and director, known as Roxann Dawson, R. Biggs, R. Biggs-Dawson

== Politicians ==
- Anna Caballero, member of the California State Assembly
- Bernardino Caballero, President of Paraguay from 1880 until 1886 and founder of the Colorado Party
- Enrique Caballero Peraza, Mexican medical doctor, psychologist and politician
- Francisco Largo Caballero, Spanish politician and trade unionist
- Guillermo Caballero Vargas, Paraguayan politician and businessman
- Javiera Caballero, American politician
- José Manuel Caballero Serrano (born 1970), Spanish politician
- Pilar Caballero Alvarez (born 1993), German politician
- Raymond Caballero, the mayor of El Paso, Texas from 2001 until 2003

== Sportspeople ==
- Celestino Caballero, Panamanian boxer
- Fabián Caballero, Argentine footballer
- Gabriel Caballero, Mexican footballer
- Jean Caballero, French footballer
- Jorge Luis Caballero Torres, Mexican footballer
- Jorge López Caballero, Colombian footballer
- José Caballero (baseball), Panamanian baseball infielder
- Luis Caballero (footballer), Paraguayan footballer
- Mauro Caballero, Paraguayan footballer
- Miguel Caballero Ortega, Spanish ski mountaineer and long-distance runner
- Putsy Caballero, American baseball infielder
- Randy Caballero, Nicaraguan-American boxer
- Roberney Caballero (born 1995), Cuban footballer
- Samuel Caballero, Honduran football defender
- Steve Caballero, professional skateboarder
- Willy Caballero, Argentinian soccer player

== Others ==
- Diego Caballero, Conquistador
- Eugenio Caballero, Mexican production designer
- Fernán Caballero, pseudonym adopted from the name of a village in the province of Ciudad Real by the Spanish novelist Cecilia Francisca Josefa Arrom de Ayala
- Guy Caballero, a character in the Canadian sketch comedy series SCTV portrayed by Joe Flaherty
- María Cristina Caballero, Colombian journalist
- Raimundo Diosdado Caballero, Catholic miscellaneous writer
