= English Civil War =

Series of wars in England, 1642–1651

- Part of the Wars of the Three Kingdoms
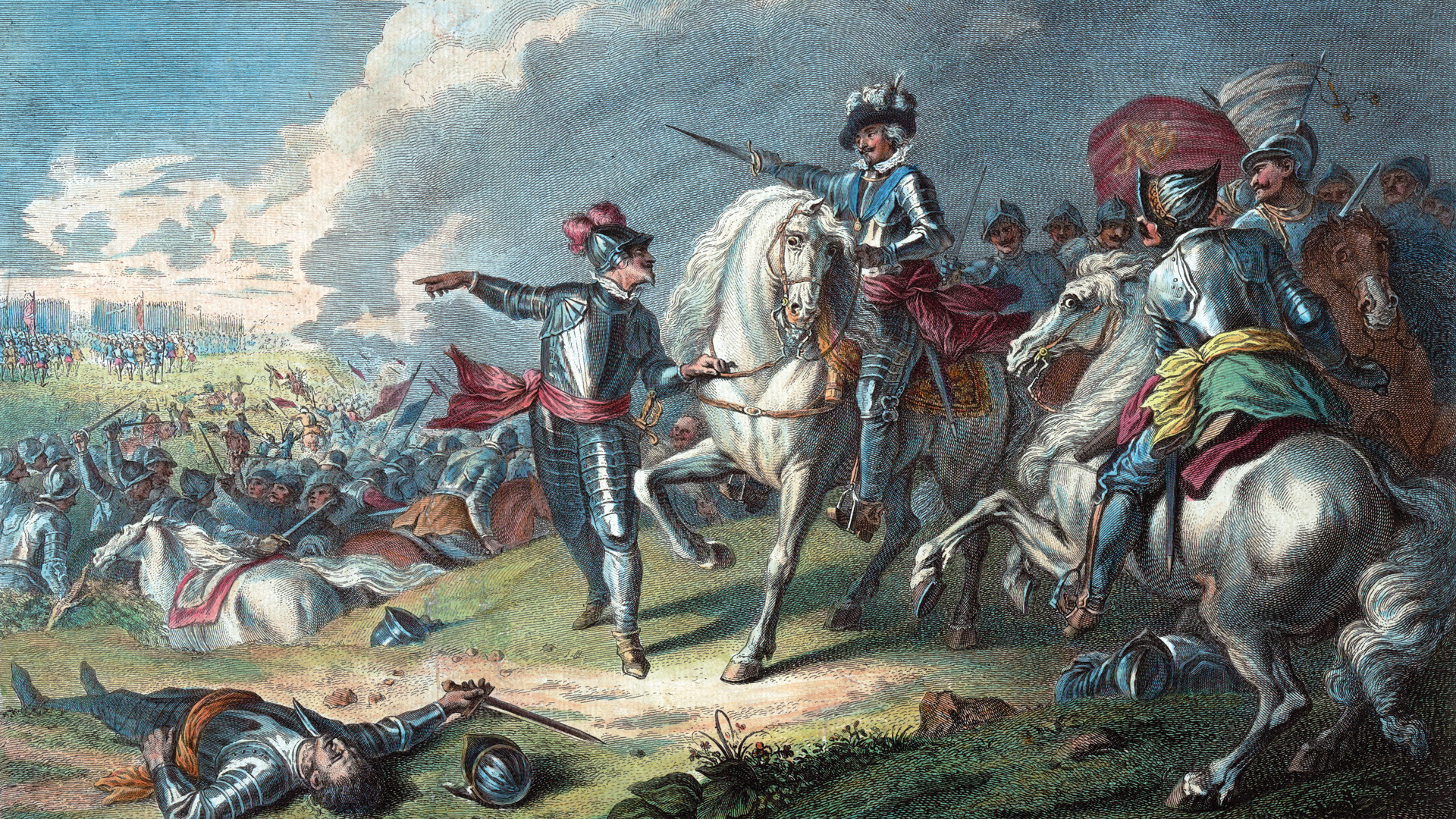
- The Battle of Naseby, 14 June 1645, a Parliamentarian victory considered to be the turning point of the English Civil War
Date	August 1642 – September 1651
Location	England and Wales, English America
Result	Parliamentarian victory

Belligerents
(Kingdom of England) Parliamentarians; Scotland (1643 to 1647)	Royalists; Scotland (1649 to 1652)

Commanders and leaders
Earl of Essex; Earl of Manchester; Thomas Fairfax; Oliver Cromwell; William Waller; Earl of Leven (1643 to 1647); David Leslie (1643 to 1645)	Charles I (surrendered) (executed); Prince Rupert (surrendered); Marquess of Newcastle; Prince Maurice; George Goring; Ralph Hopton; Charles II; Earl of Leven (1648 to 1651); David Leslie (1650 to 1651)

Casualties and losses
34,130 killed; 32,823 captured	50,700 killed; 83,467 captured
- 127,000 non-combat deaths (including some 40,000 civilians) (Note: While it is notoriously difficult to determine the number of casualties in any war, it has been estimated that the conflict in England and Wales claimed about 85,000 lives in combat, with a further 127,000 noncombat deaths (including some 40,000 civilians).)

The English Civil War or Great Rebellion was a series of civil wars and political machinations between Royalists and Parliamentarians in the Kingdom of England (Note: The Kingdom of England then comprised Wales in addition to modern-day England.) from 1642 to 1651. Part of the wider 1639 to 1653 Wars of the Three Kingdoms, the struggle consisted of the First English Civil War and the Second English Civil War. The Anglo-Scottish war of 1650 to 1652 is sometimes referred to as the Third English Civil War. The English Civil War also had a significant influence on the development of the English language. The conflict popularized political terms that are still used today, such as "Cavalier" for supporters of King Charles I and "Roundhead" for supporters of Parliament. The 1640s also saw a massive increase in the production of pamphlets, newsbooks, and political tracts, which is considered one of the first examples of mass communication in English. This period helped expand political vocabulary and introduced new words related to democracy, liberty, and religious toleration into everyday English.

While the conflicts in the three kingdoms of England, Scotland and Ireland had similarities, each had its own specific issues and objectives. The First English Civil War was fought primarily over the correct balance of power between Parliament and Charles I. It ended in June 1646 with Royalist defeat and the king in custody.

However, victory exposed Parliamentarian divisions over the nature of the political settlement. The vast majority had gone to war in 1642 to assert Parliament's right to participate in government, not abolish the monarchy, which meant Charles' refusal to make concessions led to a stalemate. Concern over the political influence of radicals within the New Model Army like Oliver Cromwell led to an alliance between moderate Parliamentarians and Royalists, supported by the Covenanter Scots. Royalist defeat in the 1648 Second English Civil War resulted in the execution of Charles I in January 1649, and the establishment of the Commonwealth of England.

In 1650, Charles II was crowned King of Scotland, in return for agreeing to create a Presbyterian church in both England and Scotland. The subsequent Anglo-Scottish war ended with Parliamentarian victory at Worcester on 3 September 1651. Both Ireland and Scotland were incorporated into the Commonwealth, and the British Isles became a unitary state. This arrangement ultimately proved both unpopular and unviable in the long term, and was dissolved upon the Stuart Restoration in 1660. The outcome of the civil wars effectively set England and Scotland on course towards a parliamentary monarchy form of government.

== Terminology ==
The term English Civil War appears most often in the singular, but historians often divide the conflict into two or three separate wars. These were not restricted to England alone, as Wales (having been annexed into the Kingdom of England) was affected by the same political instabilities. The conflicts also involved wars with Scotland and Ireland and civil wars within them. Some historians have favoured the term The British Civil Wars. From the Restoration to the 19th century, the common phrase for the civil wars was "the rebellion" or "the great rebellion".

The wars spanning all four countries are known as the Wars of the Three Kingdoms. In the early 19th century, Walter Scott referred to it as "The Great Civil War". The 1911 Encyclopædia Britannica called the series of conflicts the "Great Rebellion". Some historians, notably Marxists such as Christopher Hill, favoured the term "English Revolution".

The common nicknames of Cavaliers and Roundheads, respectively for the Royalists and Parliamentarians, both originated as pejoratives. Cavalier comes from the same Latin root as the Spanish word caballero ("knight, horseman") and had been used in the court of Elizabeth I as an insult implying pro-Spanish sympathies. Roundhead refers to how some Puritans and London apprentices wore their hair closely cropped around the head or flat, though generals of both sides wore their hair at similar lengths.

== Geography ==
Each side had a geographical stronghold, such that minority elements were silenced or fled. The Royalist areas included the countryside, the Shires, the cathedral cities of York, Chester, Worcester and Oxford, and the less economically developed areas of northern and western England and Wales. Parliament's strengths spanned the industrial centres, ports, and economically advanced regions of southern and eastern England, including the remaining cathedral cities. Historian Lacey Baldwin Smith wrote: "the words populous, rich, and rebellious seemed to go hand in hand".

== Strategy and tactics ==
Many officers and veteran soldiers had fought in European wars, notably the Eighty Years' War between the Spanish and the Dutch, which began in 1568, as well as earlier phases of the Thirty Years' War which began in 1618 and concluded in 1648.

The war was of unprecedented scale for the English. During the campaign seasons, 120,000 to 150,000 soldiers would be in the field, a higher proportion of the population than were fighting in Germany in the Thirty Years' War.

The main battle tactic came to be known as pike and shot infantry. The two sides would line up opposite one another, with infantry brigades of musketeers in the centre. These carried matchlock muskets, an inaccurate weapon which nevertheless could be lethal at a range of up to 300 yards. Musketeers would assemble three rows deep, the first kneeling, second crouching, and third standing. At times, troops divided into two groups, allowing one to reload while the other fired. Among the musketeers were pike men, carrying pikes of 12 feet (4 m) to 18 feet (5.5 m) long, whose main purpose was to protect the musketeers from cavalry charges. Positioned on each side of the infantry were cavalry, with a right wing led by the lieutenant-general and the left by the commissary general. Its main aim was to rout the opponents' cavalry, then turn and overpower their infantry.

The Royalist cavaliers' skill and speed on horseback led to many early victories. Prince Rupert, commanding the king's cavalry, used a tactic learned while fighting in the Dutch army, where cavalry would charge at full speed into the opponent's infantry, firing their pistols just before impact. However, with Oliver Cromwell and the introduction of the more disciplined New Model Army, a group of disciplined pike men would stand its ground, which could have a devastating effect. The Royalist cavalry had a tendency to chase down individual targets after the initial charge, leaving their forces scattered and tired, whereas Cromwell's cavalry was slower but better disciplined. Trained to operate as a single unit, it went on to win many decisive victories.

== History ==
=== Background ===
The English Civil War broke out in 1642, less than 40 years after the death of Queen Elizabeth I. Elizabeth had been succeeded by her first cousin twice-removed, King James VI of Scotland, as James I of England, creating the first personal union of the Scottish and English kingdoms. (Note: Although the early 17th-century Stuart monarchs styled themselves King of Great Britain, France, and Ireland, with the exception of the constitutional arrangements during the Interregnum (see the Tender of Union), full union of the Scottish and English realms into a new realm of Great Britain did not occur until the passing of the Act of Union 1707.) As King of Scots, James had become accustomed to Scotland's weak parliamentary tradition since assuming control of the Scottish government in 1583, so that upon assuming power south of the border, the new King of England was affronted by the constraints the English Parliament attempted to place on him in exchange for money. Consequently, James's personal extravagance, which resulted in him being perennially short of money, meant that he had to resort to extra-parliamentary sources of income. Moreover, increasing inflation during this period meant that even though Parliament was granting the King the same nominal value of subsidy, the income was actually worth less.

This extravagance was tempered by James's peaceful disposition, so that by the succession of his son Charles I in 1625 the two kingdoms had both experienced relative peace, internally and in their relations with each other. Charles followed his father's dream in hoping to unite the kingdoms of England, Scotland and Ireland into a single kingdom. Many English Parliamentarians were suspicious of such a move, fearing that such a new kingdom might destroy old English traditions that had bound the English monarchy. Because James had described kings as "little gods on Earth", chosen by God to rule in accordance with the doctrine of the Divine Right of Kings, and Charles shared his father's position, the suspicions of the Parliamentarians had some justification.

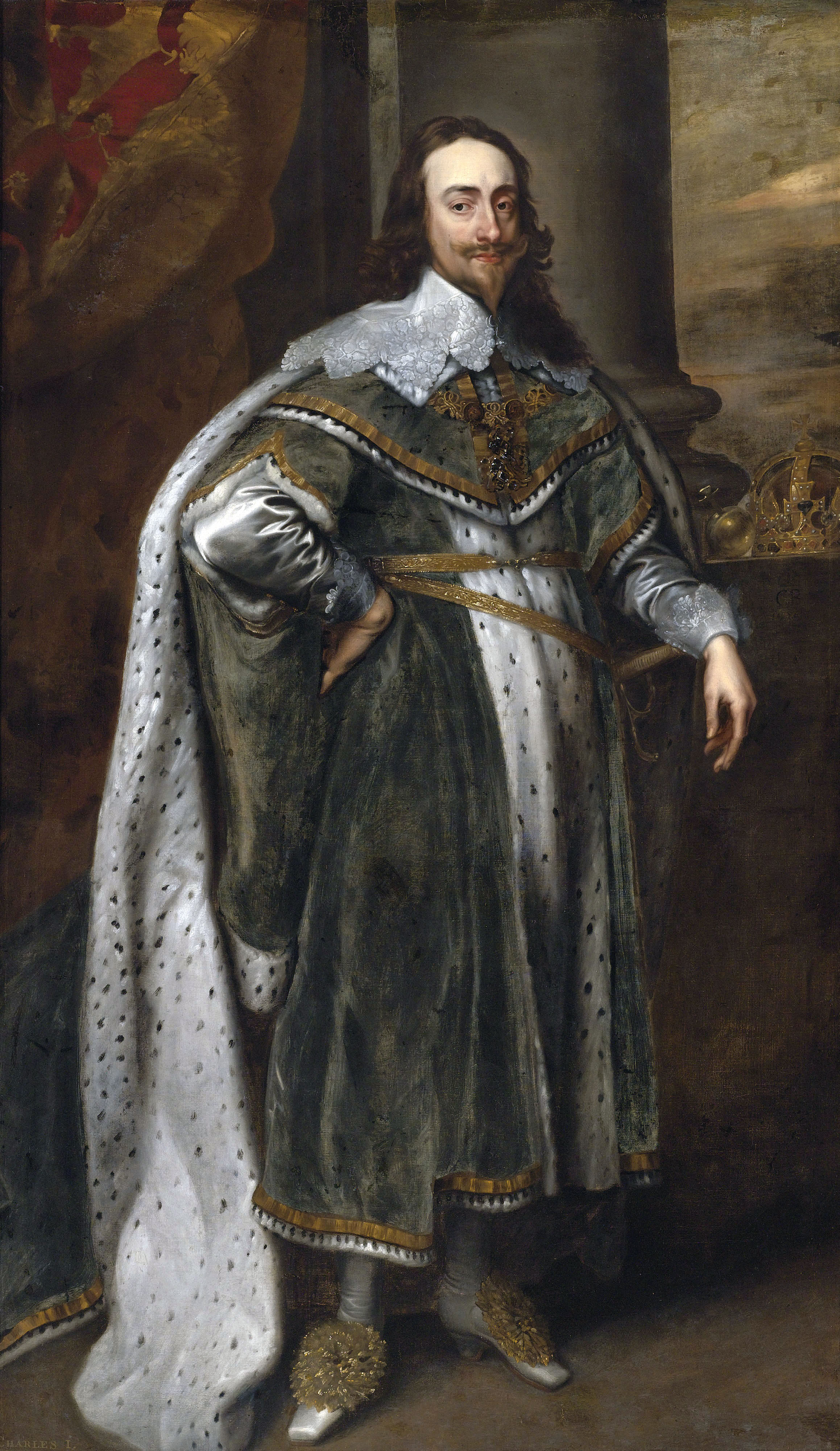
Charles I believed in the divine right of kings; painting by Van Dyck

==== Parliament in an English constitutional framework ====
At the time, the Parliament of England did not have a large permanent role in the English system of government. Instead, it functioned as a temporary advisory committee and was summoned only if and when the monarch saw fit. Once summoned, a Parliament's continued existence was at the King's pleasure since it was subject to dissolution by him at any time.

Yet in spite of this limited role, Parliament had acquired over the centuries de facto powers of enough significance that monarchs could not simply ignore them indefinitely. For a monarch, Parliament's most indispensable power was its ability to raise tax revenues far in excess of all other sources of revenue at the Crown's disposal. By the 17th century, Parliament's tax-raising powers had come to be derived from the fact that the gentry was the only stratum of society with the ability and authority to collect and remit the most meaningful forms of taxation then available at the local level. So, if the king wanted to ensure smooth revenue collection, he needed the gentry's cooperation. For all of the Crown's legal authority, its resources were limited by any modern standard to the extent that if the gentry refused to collect the king's taxes on a national scale, the Crown lacked a practical means of compelling them.

From the thirteenth century, monarchs ordered the election of representatives to sit in the House of Commons, with most voters being the owners of property, although in some potwalloper boroughs every male householder could vote. When assembled along with the House of Lords, these elected representatives formed a Parliament. So the concept of Parliaments allowed representatives of the property-owning class to meet, primarily, at least from the point of view of the monarch, to sanction whatever taxes the monarch wished to collect. In the process, the representatives could debate and enact statutes, or acts. However, Parliament lacked the power to force its will upon the monarch; its only leverage was the threat of withholding the financial means required to implement his plans.

==== Parliamentary concerns and the Petition of Right ====
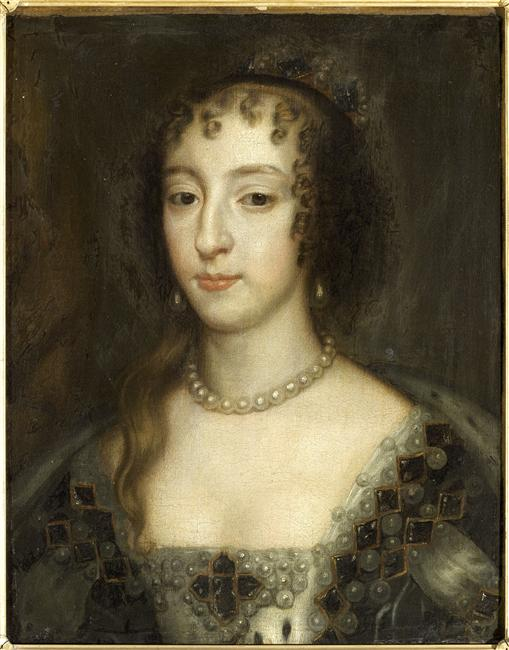
Henrietta Maria, painted by Peter Lely, 1660

Many concerns were raised over Charles's marriage in 1625 to a Roman Catholic French princess, Henrietta Maria. Parliament refused to assign him the traditional right to collect customs duties for his entire reign, deciding instead to grant it only on a provisional basis and negotiate with him.

Charles, meanwhile, decided to send an expeditionary force to relieve the French Huguenots, whom French royal troops held besieged in La Rochelle. Such military support for Protestants on the Continent potentially alleviated concerns about the King's marriage to a Catholic. However, Charles's insistence on giving command of the English force to his unpopular royal favorite George Villiers, the Duke of Buckingham, undermined that support. Unfortunately for Charles and Buckingham, the 1627 relief expedition proved a fiasco, and Parliament, already hostile to Buckingham for his monopoly on royal patronage, opened impeachment proceedings against him. Charles responded by dissolving Parliament. This saved Buckingham but confirmed the impression that Charles wanted to avoid Parliamentary scrutiny of his ministers.

Having dissolved Parliament and unable to raise money without it, the king assembled a new one in 1628. (The elected members included Oliver Cromwell, John Hampden, and Edward Coke.) The new Parliament drew up a Petition of Right, which Charles accepted as a concession to obtain his subsidy. The Petition made reference to Magna Carta, but did not grant him the right of tonnage and poundage, which Charles had been collecting without Parliamentary authorization since 1625. Several more active members of the opposition were imprisoned, which caused outrage; one, John Eliot, subsequently died in prison and came to be seen as a martyr for the rights of Parliament.

==== Personal rule ====
Charles avoided calling a Parliament for the next decade, a period known as the "personal rule of Charles I", or by its critics as the "Eleven Years' Tyranny". During this period, Charles's policies were determined by his lack of money. First and foremost, to avoid Parliament, the King needed to avoid war. Charles made peace with France and Spain, effectively ending England's involvement in the Thirty Years' War. However, that in itself was far from enough to balance the Crown's finances.

Unable to raise revenue without Parliament and unwilling to convene it, Charles resorted to other means. One was to revive conventions, often outdated. For example, a failure to attend and receive knighthood at Charles's coronation became a finable offence with the fine paid to the Crown. The King also tried to raise revenue through ship money, demanding in 1634–1636 that the inland English counties pay a tax for the Royal Navy to counter the threat of privateers and pirates in the English Channel. Established law supported the policy of coastal counties and inland ports such as London paying ship money in times of need, but it had not been applied to inland counties before.

Authorities had ignored it for centuries, and many saw it as yet another extra-Parliamentary, illegal tax, which prompted some prominent men to refuse to pay it. Charles issued a writ against John Hampden for his failure to pay, and although five judges including George Croke supported Hampden, seven judges found in favour of the King in 1638. The fines imposed on people who refused to pay ship money and standing out against its illegality aroused widespread indignation.

During his "Personal Rule", Charles aroused most antagonism through his religious measures. He believed in High Anglicanism, a sacramental version of the Church of England, theologically based upon Arminianism, a creed shared with his main political adviser, Archbishop William Laud. In 1633, Charles appointed Laud Archbishop of Canterbury and started making the Church more ceremonial, replacing the wooden communion tables with stone altars. Puritans accused Laud of reintroducing Catholicism, and when they complained he had them arrested. In 1637, John Bastwick, Henry Burton, and William Prynne had their ears cut off for writing pamphlets attacking Laud's views – a rare penalty for gentlemen, and one that aroused anger. Moreover, the Church authorities revived statutes from the time of Elizabeth I about church attendance and fined Puritans for not attending Anglican services.

==== Rebellion in Scotland ====
The end of Charles's independent governance came when he attempted to apply the same religious policies in Scotland. The Church of Scotland, reluctantly episcopal in structure, had independent traditions. Charles wanted one uniform Church throughout Britain and introduced a new, High Anglican version of the English Book of Common Prayer to Scotland in the middle of 1637. This was violently resisted. A riot broke out in Edinburgh, which may have been started in St Giles' Cathedral, according to legend, by Jenny Geddes. In February 1638, the Scots formulated their objections to royal policy in the National Covenant. This document took the form of a "loyal protest", rejecting all innovations not first tested by free Parliaments and General Assemblies of the Church.

By the spring of 1639, a political movement known as the Covenanters had taken control of Scotland and Charles decided to re-assert his authority by force. He accompanied an army to the Scottish border near Berwick but hostilities were avoided when a truce was agreed. However, both sides viewed the truce as temporary, and continued preparations for military confrontation.

==== Recall of the English Parliament ====
Charles needed to suppress the rebellion in Scotland but he lacked sufficient funds. To obtain finance, in February 1640 for the first time in 11 years, he recalled an English Parliament. The majority faction of the new Parliament, led by John Pym, were opposed to an English invasion of Scotland and used Charles's appeal for money as a chance to redress grievances. Charles took exception to this lèse-majesté. Negotiations collapsed and after only a few weeks he dissolved what later became known as the Short Parliament.

Without Parliament's support, Charles again prepared for war with Scotland. In August, a Scots army invaded, won a battle at Newburn and occupied parts of the north of England. This put Charles in a desperate financial state and, according to advice from the Magnum Concilium, another truce was established where Charles agreed to pay the Scottish army's expenses pending the negotiation of a final settlement. He also agreed to summon another English Parliament in November 1640.

==== The Long Parliament ====
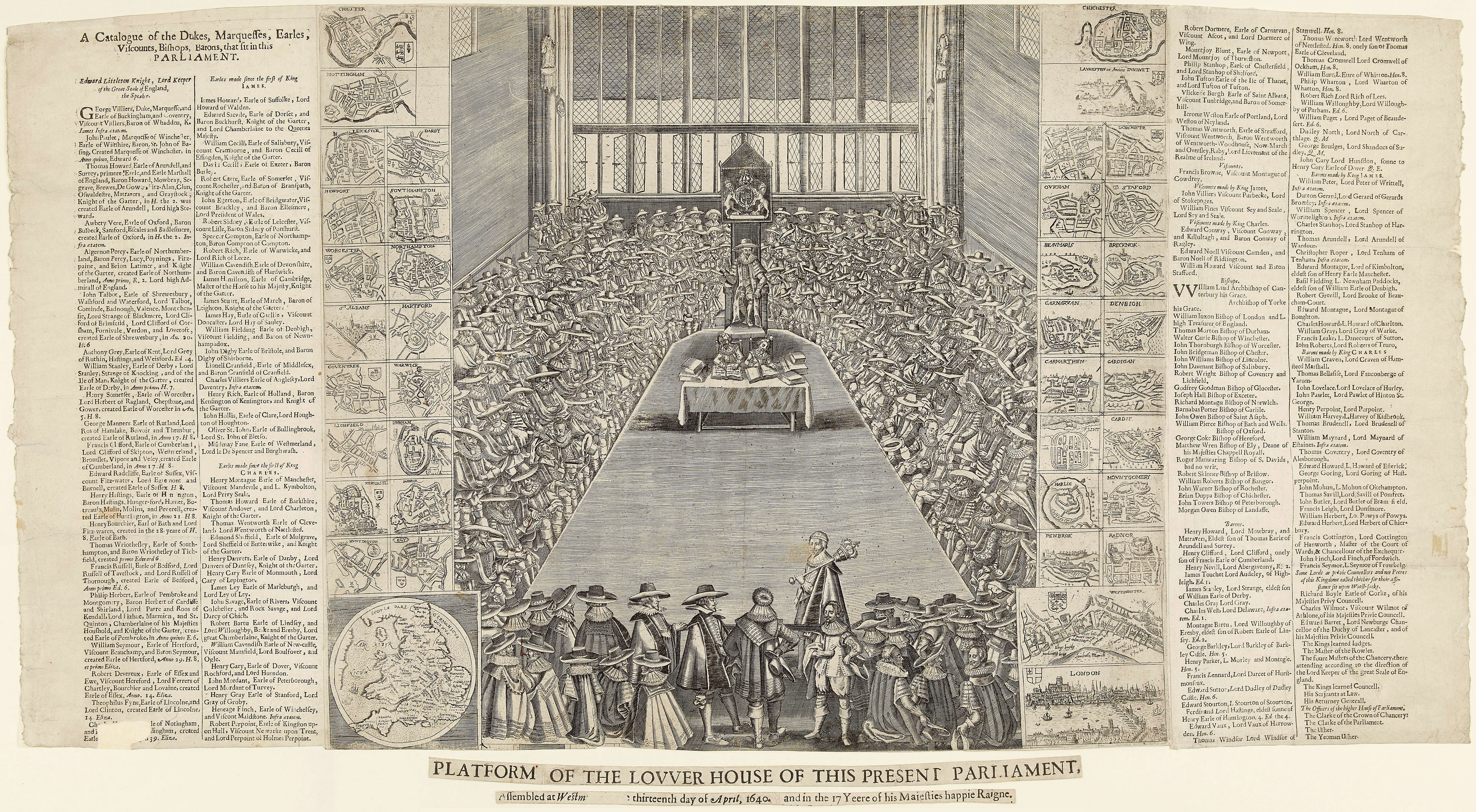
A sitting of the Long Parliament, 1640

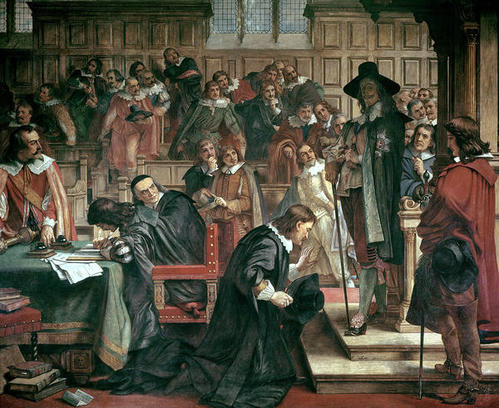
The king's attempt to arrest the Five Members, depicted in a 19th-century painting.

The new Parliament proved even more hostile to Charles than its predecessor. It immediately began to discuss grievances against him and his government, with Pym and Hampden in the lead. They took the opportunity presented by the King's troubles to force various reforming measures – including many with strong "anti-Papist" themes – upon him. The members passed a law stating that a new Parliament would convene at least once every three years – without the King's summons if need be. Other laws passed making it illegal for the king to impose taxes without Parliamentary consent and later gave Parliament control over the King's ministers.

Finally, the Parliament passed a law forbidding the King to dissolve it without its consent, even if the three years were up. These laws equated to a tremendous increase in Parliamentary power. Ever since, this Parliament has been known as the Long Parliament. However, Parliament did attempt to avert conflict by requiring all adults to sign The Protestation, an oath of allegiance to Charles. (Note: See Walter 1999, p. 294, for some of the complexities of how the Protestation was interpreted by different political actors.)

Early in the Long Parliament, the house overwhelmingly accused Thomas Wentworth (now Earl of Strafford) of high treason and other crimes and misdemeanors. Henry Vane the Younger supplied evidence of Strafford's claimed improper use of the army in Ireland, alleging that he had encouraged the King to use his Ireland-raised forces to threaten England into compliance. This evidence was obtained from Vane's father, Henry Vane the Elder, a member of the King's Privy Council, who refused to confirm it in Parliament out of loyalty to Charles. On 10 April 1641, Pym's case collapsed, but Pym made a direct appeal to the Younger Vane to produce a copy of the notes from the King's Privy Council, discovered by the Younger Vane and secretly turned over to Pym, to the great anguish of the Elder Vane. These notes contained evidence that Strafford had told the King, "Sir, you have done your duty, and your subjects have failed in theirs; and therefore you are absolved from the rules of government, and may supply yourself by extraordinary ways; you have an army in Ireland, with which you may reduce the kingdom."

Pym immediately launched a Bill of Attainder stating Strafford's guilt and demanding that he be put to death. Unlike a guilty verdict in a court case, attainder did not require a legal burden of proof to be met, but it did require the king's approval. Charles, however, guaranteed Strafford that he would not sign the attainder, without which the bill could not be passed. Furthermore, the Lords opposed the severity of a death sentence on Strafford. Yet increased tensions and a plot in the army to support Strafford began to sway the issue.

On 21 April, the Commons passed the Bill (204 in favour, 59 opposed, and 250 abstained), and the Lords acquiesced. Charles, still incensed over the Commons' handling of Buckingham, refused his assent. Strafford himself, hoping to head off the war he saw looming, wrote to the king and asked him to reconsider. Charles, fearing for the safety of his family, signed on 10 May. Strafford was beheaded two days later. In the meantime, both Parliament and the King agreed to an independent investigation into the king's involvement in Strafford's plot.

The Long Parliament then passed the Triennial Act 1640, also known as the Dissolution Act, in May 1641, to which royal assent was readily granted. The Triennial Act required Parliament to be summoned at least once in three years. When the king failed to issue a proper summons, the members could assemble on their own. This act also forbade ship money without Parliament's consent, fines in distraint of knighthood, and forced loans. Monopolies were cut back sharply, the courts of the Star Chamber and High Commission abolished by the Habeas Corpus Act 1640, and the Triennial Act respectively.

All remaining forms of taxation were legalised and regulated by the Tonnage and Poundage Act 1640. On 3 May, Parliament decreed The Protestation, attacking the 'wicked counsels' of Charles's government, whereby those who signed the petition undertook to defend 'the true reformed religion', Parliament, and the king's person, honour and estate. Throughout May, the House of Commons launched several bills attacking bishops and Episcopalianism in general, each time defeated in the Lords.

Charles and his Parliament hoped that the execution of Strafford and the Protestation would end the drift towards war, but in fact, they encouraged it. Charles and his supporters continued to resent Parliament's demands, and Parliamentarians continued to suspect Charles of wanting to impose episcopalianism and unfettered royal rule by military force. Within months, the Irish Catholics, fearing a resurgence of Protestant power, struck first, and all Ireland soon descended into chaos. Rumours circulated that the King supported the Irish, and Puritan members of the Commons soon started murmuring that this exemplified the fate that Charles had in store for them all.

On 4 January 1642, Charles, followed by 400 soldiers, entered the House of Commons and attempted to arrest five members on a charge of treason. The members had learned that he was coming and escaped. Charles not only failed to arrest them but turned more people against him.

==== Local grievances ====
In the summer of 1642, these national troubles helped to polarise opinion, ending indecision about which side to support or what action to take. Opposition to Charles also arose from many local grievances. For example, imposed drainage schemes in The Fens disrupted the livelihood of thousands after the King awarded a number of drainage contracts. Many saw the King as indifferent to public welfare, and this played a role in bringing much of eastern England into the Parliamentarian camp. This sentiment brought with it such people as Edward Montagu, Earl of Manchester and Oliver Cromwell, each a notable wartime adversary of the King. Conversely, one of the leading drainage contractors, Robert Bertie, Earl of Lindsey, was to die fighting for the King at the Battle of Edgehill.

=== First English Civil War (1642–1646) ===
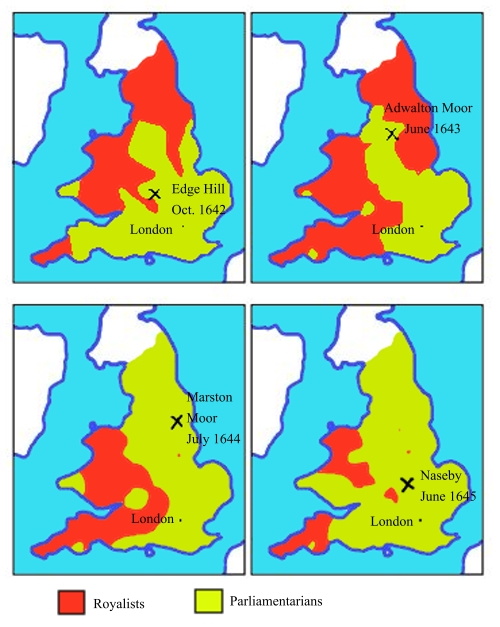
Maps of territory held by Royalists (red) and Parliamentarians (yellow-green), 1642–1645

In early January 1642, a few days after failing to capture five members of the House of Commons, Charles feared for the safety of his family and retinue and left the London area for the north country.

Further frequent negotiations by letter between the King and the Long Parliament, through to early summer, proved fruitless. On 1 June the English Lords and Commons approved a list of proposals known as the Nineteen Propositions. In these demands, the Parliament sought a larger share of power in the governance of the kingdom. Before the end of the month the King rejected the Propositions.

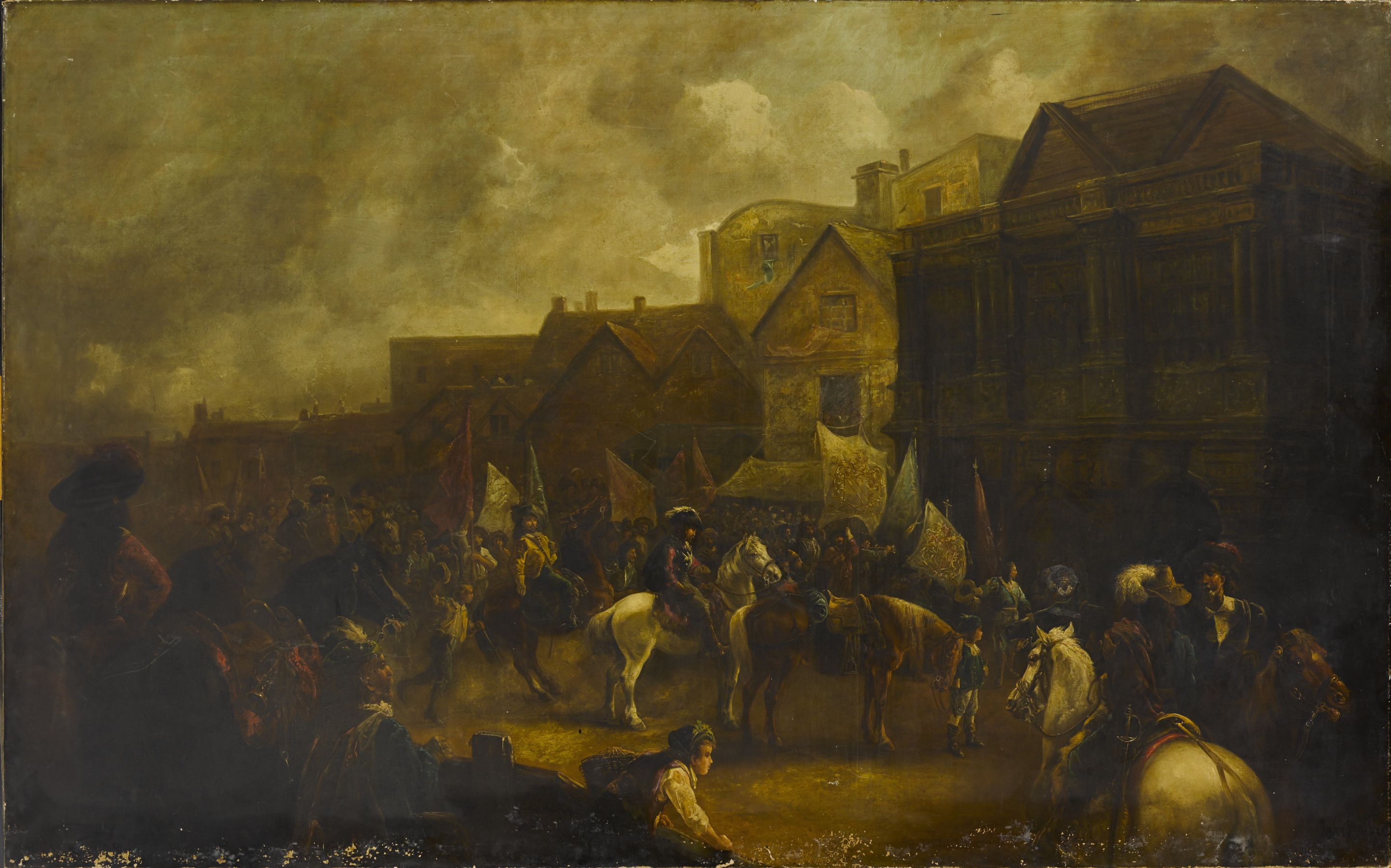
'Cavalier Troops Mustering outside the Guildhall, Exeter' by John Joseph Barker, 1886. This oil on canvas depicts Cavalier troops outside the Exeter Guildhall. From the Royal Albert Memorial Museum's collection (93/1978x)

As the summer progressed, cities and towns declared their sympathies for one faction or the other: for example, the garrison of Portsmouth commanded by George Goring declared for the King, but when Charles tried to acquire arms from Kingston upon Hull, the weaponry depository used in the previous Scottish campaigns, John Hotham, the military governor appointed by Parliament in January, refused to let Charles enter the town, and when Charles returned with more men later, Hotham drove them off. Charles issued a warrant for Hotham's arrest as a traitor but was powerless to enforce it. Throughout the summer, tensions rose and there was brawling in several places, the first death from the conflict taking place in Manchester.

==== 1642 battles ====
Oliver Cromwell rose to become Lord Protector in 1653

At the outset of the conflict, much of the country remained neutral, though the Royal Navy and most English cities favoured Parliament, while the King found marked support in rural communities. The war quickly spread and eventually involved every level of society. Many areas attempted to remain neutral. Some formed bands of Clubmen to protect their localities from the worst excesses of the armies of both sides, but most found it impossible to withstand both King and Parliament.

On one side, the King and his supporters fought for what they saw as traditional government in church and state. On the other, most Parliamentarians initially took up arms to defend what they viewed as a traditional balance of government in church and state, and which they felt had been undermined by bad advice the King received from his advisers — such as George Villiers, Duke of Buckingham — and during his Personal Rule (the "Eleven Years' Tyranny"). The views of the members of Parliament ranged from unquestioning support of the King – at one point during the First Civil War, more members of the Commons and Lords gathered in the King's Oxford Parliament than at Westminster — through to radicals who sought major reforms in religious independence and redistribution of power at a national level.

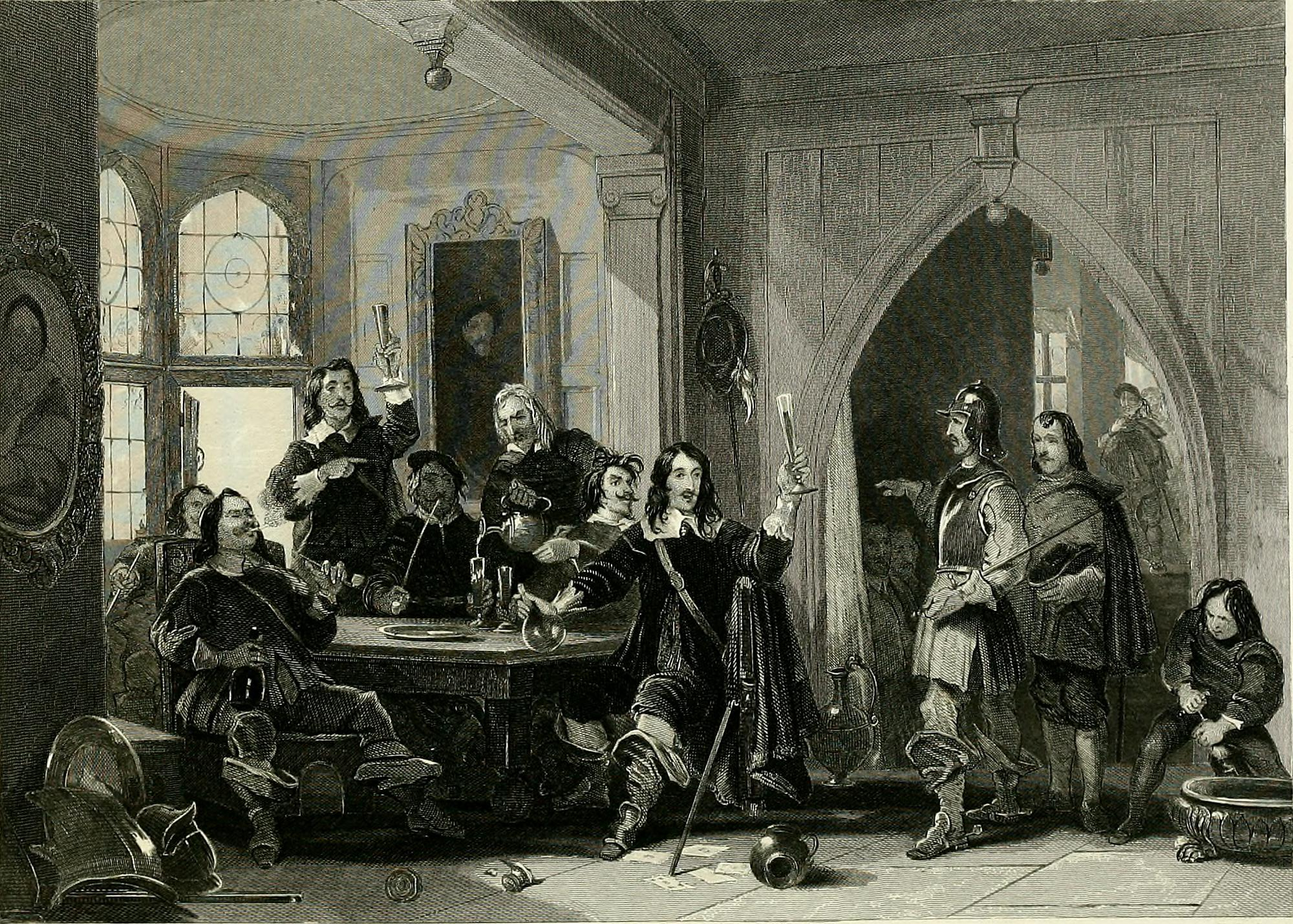
Charles I. and Cromwell

After the debacle at Hull, Charles moved on to Nottingham, raising the royal standard there on 22 August 1642. At the time, Charles had with him about 2,000 cavalry and a small number of Yorkshire infantrymen, and using the archaic system of a Commission of Array, his supporters started to build a larger army around the standard. Charles moved in a westerly direction, first to Stafford, then on to Shrewsbury, as support for his cause seemed particularly strong in the Severn valley area and in North Wales. While passing through Wellington, he declared in what became known as the "Wellington Declaration" that he would uphold the "Protestant religion, the laws of England, and the liberty of Parliament".

The Parliamentarians who opposed the King did not remain passive in this pre-war period. As in Hull, they took measures to secure strategic towns and cities by appointing to office men sympathetic to their cause. On 9 June they voted to raise an army of 10,000 volunteers and appointed Robert Devereux, 3rd Earl of Essex its commander three days later. He received orders "to rescue His Majesty's person, and the persons of the Prince [of Wales] and the Duke of York [James II] out of the hands of those desperate persons who were about them." The Lords Lieutenant whom Parliament appointed used the Militia Ordinance to order the militia to join Essex's army.

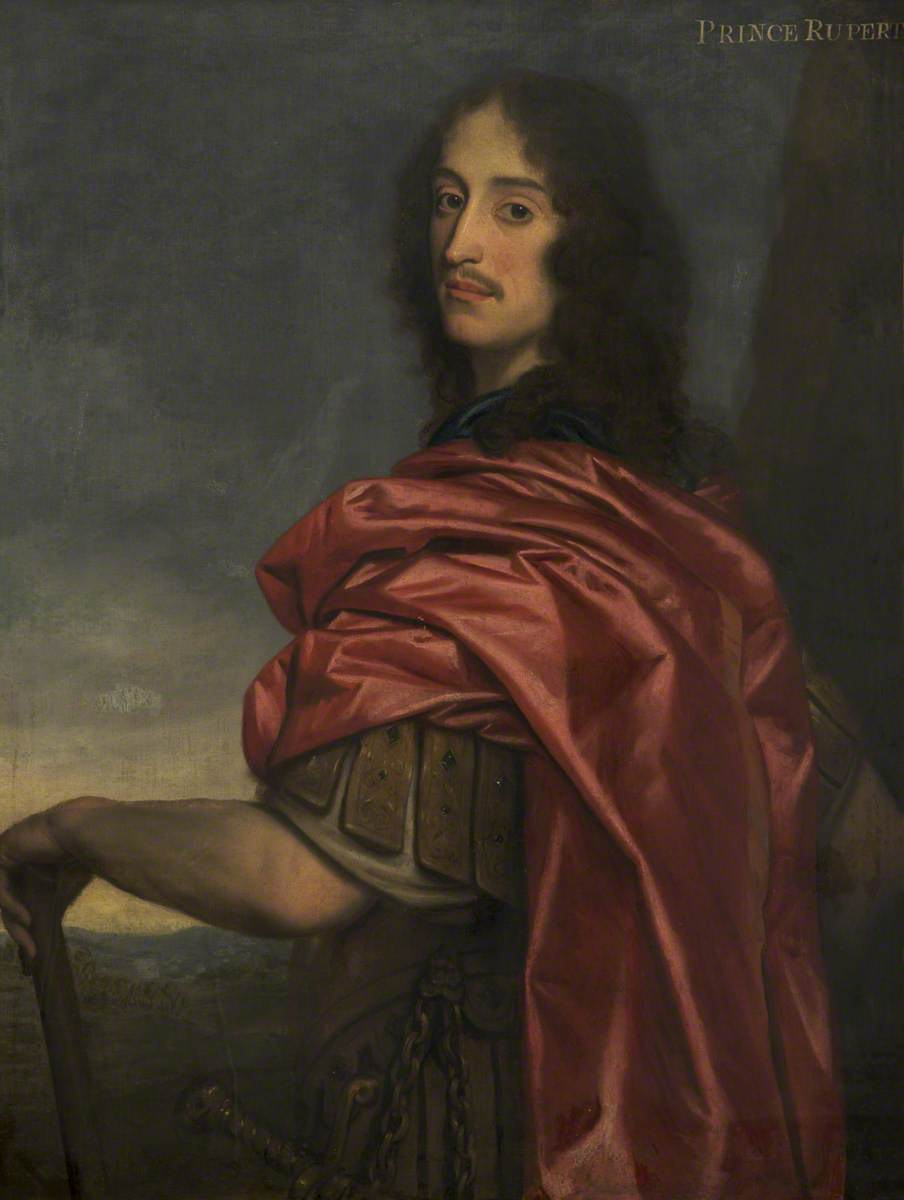
Prince Rupert of the Rhine

Two weeks after the King had raised his standard at Nottingham, Essex led his army north towards Northampton, picking up support along the way (including a detachment of Huntingdonshire cavalry raised and commanded by Oliver Cromwell). (Note: Cromwell had already secured Cambridge and the supplies of college silver.) By mid-September Essex's forces had grown to 21,000 infantry and 4,200 cavalry and dragoons. On 14 September he moved his army to Coventry and then to the north of the Cotswolds, a strategy that placed it between the Royalists and London. With the size of both armies now in the tens of thousands and only Worcestershire between them, it was inevitable that cavalry reconnaissance units would meet sooner or later. This happened in the first major skirmish of the Civil War, when a troop of about 1,000 Royalist cavalry under Prince Rupert, a German nephew of the King and one of the outstanding cavalry commanders of the war, defeated a Parliamentary cavalry detachment under Colonel John Brown at the Battle of Powick Bridge, which crossed the River Teme close to Worcester.

Rupert withdrew to Shrewsbury, where a council-of-war discussed two courses of action: whether to advance towards Essex's new position near Worcester, or march down the now open road towards London. The Council decided on the London route, but not to avoid a battle, for the Royalist generals wanted to fight Essex before he grew too strong, and the temper of both sides made it impossible to postpone the decision. In the Earl of Clarendon's words, "it was considered more counsellable to march towards London, it being morally sure that the earl of Essex would put himself in their way." Hence, the army left Shrewsbury on 12 October, gaining two days' start on the enemy, and moved south-east. This had the desired effect of forcing Essex to move to intercept them.

The first pitched battle of the war, at Edgehill on 23 October, proved inconclusive, with both Royalists and Parliamentarians claiming victory. The second field action, the stand-off at Turnham Green, saw Charles forced to withdraw to Oxford, which would serve as his base for the rest of the war.

==== 1643 battles ====
In 1643, Royalist forces won at Adwalton Moor, gaining control of most of Yorkshire. In the Midlands, a Parliamentary force under John Gell besieged and captured the cathedral city of Lichfield, after the death of the original commander, Lord Brooke. This group then joined forces with William Brereton at the inconclusive Battle of Hopton Heath (19 March), where the Royalist commander, the Earl of Northampton, was killed. John Hampden died after being wounded in the Battle of Chalgrove Field (18 June 1643). Subsequent battles in the west of England at Lansdowne and Roundway Down also went to the Royalists. Prince Rupert could then take Bristol. In the same year, however, Cromwell formed his troop of "Ironsides", a disciplined unit that demonstrated his military leadership ability. With their assistance he won a victory at the Battle of Gainsborough in July.

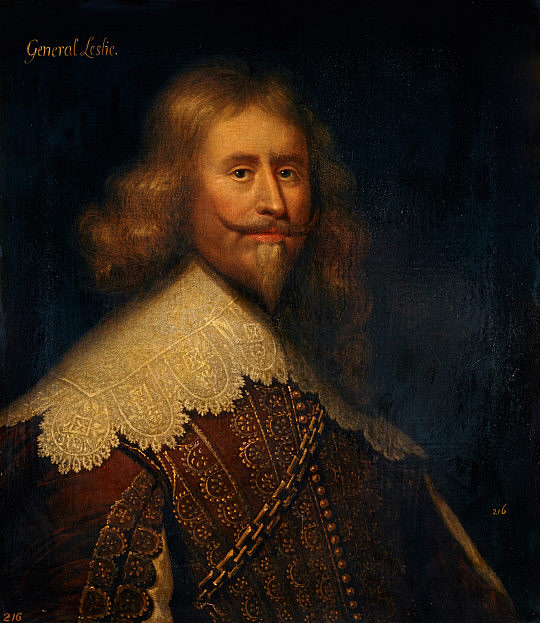
Alexander Leslie, 1st Earl of Leven, Lord General of the Covenanter Army and one of the victors of Marston Moor

At this stage, from 7 to 9 August, there were some popular demonstrations in London – both for and against war. They were protesting at Westminster. A peace demonstration by London women, which turned violent, was suppressed; the women were beaten and fired upon with live ammunition, leaving several dead. Many were arrested and incarcerated in Bridewell and other prisons. After these August events, the Venetian ambassador in England reported to the doge that the London government took considerable measures to stifle dissent.

In general, the early part of the war went well for the Royalists. The turning point came in the late summer and early autumn of 1643, when the Earl of Essex's army forced the king to raise the Siege of Gloucester and then brushed the Royalists aside at the First Battle of Newbury (20 September), to return triumphantly to London. Parliamentarian forces led by the Earl of Manchester besieged the port of King's Lynn, Norfolk, which under Hamon L'Estrange held out until September. Other forces won the Battle of Winceby, giving them control of Lincoln. Political manoeuvring to gain an advantage in numbers led Charles to negotiate a ceasefire in Ireland, freeing up English troops to fight on the Royalist side in England, while Parliament offered concessions to the Scots in return for aid and assistance.

==== 1644 battles ====
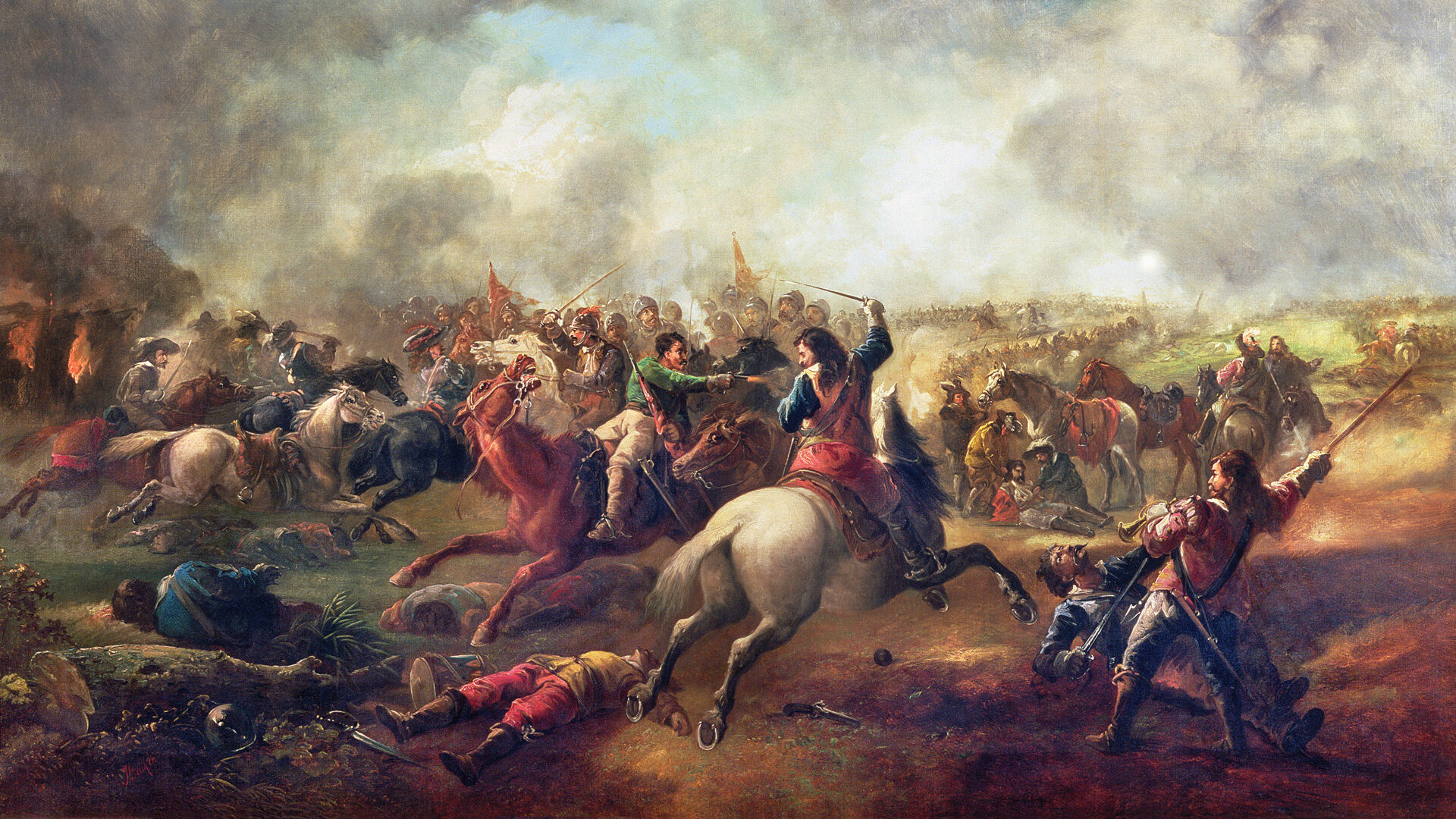
The Battle of Marston Moor in July 1644 was won by the Parliamentarians

Helped by the Scots, Parliament won at Marston Moor (2 July), gaining York and the north of England. Cromwell's conduct in the battle proved decisive, and showed his potential as a political and as an important military leader. Parliament's defeat at the Battle of Lostwithiel in Cornwall, however, marked a serious reverse in the south-west of England. Subsequent fighting around Newbury (27 October), though tactically indecisive, strategically gave another check to Parliament.

==== 1645 battles ====
In 1645, Parliament reaffirmed its determination to fight the war to a finish. It passed the Self-denying Ordinance, by which all members of either House of Parliament laid down their commands and re-organised its main forces into the New Model Army, under the command of Thomas Fairfax, with Cromwell as his second-in-command and Lieutenant-General of Horse. In two decisive engagements – the Battle of Naseby on 14 June and the Battle of Langport on 10 July – the Parliamentarians effectively destroyed Charles's armies.

==== 1646 battles ====
In the remains of his English realm, Charles tried to recover a stable base of support by consolidating the Midlands. He began to form an axis between Oxford and Newark-on-Trent in Nottinghamshire. These towns had become fortresses and showed more reliable loyalty to him than others. He took Leicester, which lies between them, but found his resources exhausted. Having little opportunity to replenish them, in May 1646 he sought shelter with a Presbyterian Scottish army at Southwell in Nottinghamshire. Charles was eventually handed over to the English Parliament by the Scots and imprisoned. This marked the end of the First English Civil War.

=== Interbellum ===
The end of the First Civil War, in 1646, left a partial power vacuum in which any combination of the three English factions, Royalists, Independents of the New Model Army ("the Army"), and Presbyterians of the English Parliament, as well as the Scottish Parliament allied with Scottish Presbyterians, could prove strong enough to dominate the rest. Armed political Royalism was at an end, but despite being a prisoner, Charles I was considered by himself and his opponents (almost to the last) as necessary to ensure the success of whichever group could come to terms with him. Thus, he passed successively into the hands of the Scots, the Parliament and the Army.

The King attempted to reverse the verdict of arms by "coquetting" with each in turn. On 3 June 1647, Cornet George Joyce of Thomas Fairfax's cavalry seized the King for the New Model Army; following the seizure, the English Presbyterians and the Scots began to prepare for a fresh civil war, less than two years after the conclusion of the first, this time against "Independency" as embodied in the Army. After making use of the Army, its opponents attempted to disband it, send it onward to foreign service, and to cut off its arrears of pay.

The result was that the Army leadership was exasperated beyond control, and, remembering not merely its grievances but also the principle for which the Army had fought, it soon became the most powerful political force in the realm. From 1646 to 1648 the breach between Army and Parliament widened day by day, until finally the Presbyterian party, combined with the Scots and the remaining Royalists, felt itself strong enough to begin a Second Civil War.

=== Second English Civil War (1648–1649) ===
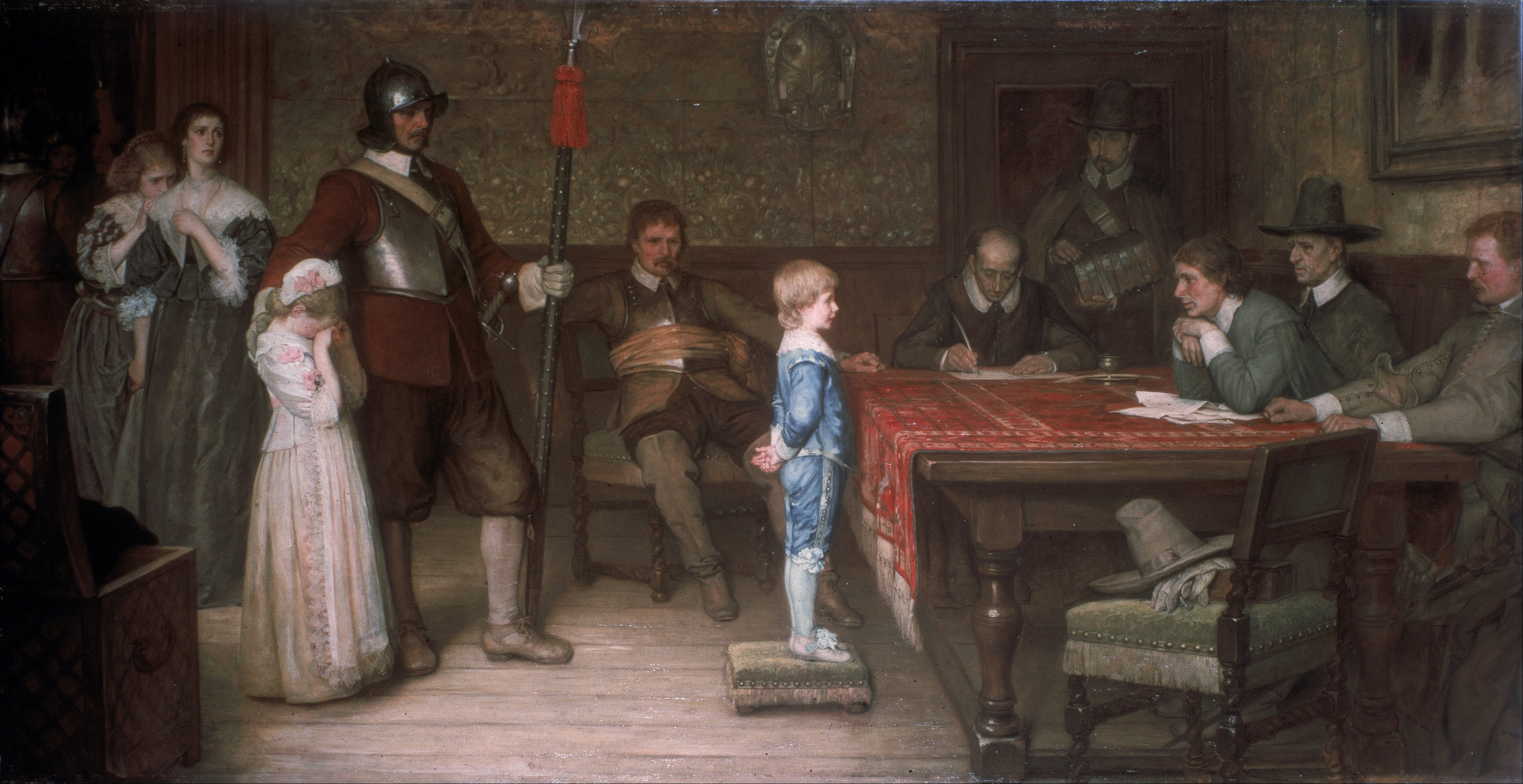
"And when did you last see your father?" by William Frederick Yeames. The oil-on-canvas picture, painted in 1878, depicts a scene in an imaginary Royalist household during the English Civil War. The Parliamentarians have taken over the house and question the son about his Royalist father. The man lounging on a chair in the centre of the scene is identifiable as a Roundhead officer by his military attire and his orange sash.

Charles I took advantage of the deflection of attention away from himself to negotiate on 28 December 1647 a secret treaty with the Scots, again promising church reform. Under the agreement, called the "Engagement", the Scots undertook to invade England on Charles's behalf and restore him to the throne.

A series of Royalist uprisings throughout England and a Scottish invasion occurred in the summer of 1648. Forces loyal to Parliament put down most of those in England after little more than a skirmish, but uprisings in Kent, Essex and Cumberland, the rebellion in Wales, and the Scottish invasion involved pitched battles and prolonged sieges.

In the spring of 1648, unpaid Parliamentarian troops in Wales changed sides. Colonel Thomas Horton defeated the Royalist rebels at the Battle of St Fagans (8 May) and the rebel leaders surrendered to Cromwell on 11 July after a protracted two-month siege of Pembroke. Thomas Fairfax defeated a Royalist uprising in Kent at the Battle of Maidstone on 1 June. Fairfax, after his success at Maidstone and the pacification of Kent, turned north to reduce Essex, where, under an ardent, experienced and popular leader, Charles Lucas, the Royalists had taken up arms in great numbers. Fairfax soon drove the enemy into Colchester, but his first attack on the town met with a repulse and he had to settle down to a long siege.

In the North of England, Major-General John Lambert fought a successful campaign against several Royalist uprisings, the largest being that of Marmaduke Langdale in Cumberland. Thanks to Lambert's successes, the Scottish commander, the Duke of Hamilton, had to take a western route through Carlisle in his pro-Royalist Scottish invasion of England. The Parliamentarians under Cromwell engaged the Scots at the Battle of Preston (17–19 August). The battle took place largely at Walton-le-Dale near Preston, Lancashire, and resulted in a victory for Cromwell's troops over the Royalists and Scots commanded by Hamilton. This victory marked the end of the Second English Civil War.

Nearly all the Royalists who had fought in the First Civil War had given their word not to bear arms against Parliament, and many, like Lord Astley, were therefore bound by oath not to take any part in the second conflict. So, the victors in the Second Civil War showed little mercy to those who had brought war into the land again. On the evening of the surrender of Colchester, Parliamentarians had Charles Lucas and George Lisle shot. Parliamentary authorities sentenced the leaders of the Welsh rebels, Major-General Rowland Laugharne, Colonel John Poyer and Colonel Rice Powel to death, but executed only Poyer (25 April 1649), having selected him by lot. Of five prominent Royalist peers who had fallen into Parliamentary hands, three – the Duke of Hamilton, the Henry Rich, Earl of Holland, and Arthur Capell, one of the Colchester prisoners and a man of high character – were beheaded at Westminster on 9 March.

=== Trial of Charles I for treason ===
Charles's secret pacts and encouragement of supporters to break their parole caused Parliament to debate whether to return the King to power at all. Those who still supported Charles's place on the throne, such as the army leader and moderate Fairfax, tried again to negotiate with him. The Army, furious that Parliament continued to countenance Charles as a ruler, then marched on Parliament and conducted "Pride's Purge", named after the commanding officer of the operation, Thomas Pride, in December 1648.

Troops arrested 45 members and kept 146 out of the chamber. They allowed only 75 members in, and then only at the Army's bidding. This Rump Parliament received orders to set up, in the name of the people of England, a High Court of Justice for the trial of Charles I for treason. Fairfax, a constitutional monarchist, declined to have anything to do with the trial. He resigned as head of the army, so clearing Cromwell's road to power.

At the end of the trial the 59 Commissioners judged Charles I guilty of high treason as a "tyrant, traitor, murderer and public enemy". He was beheaded on a scaffold in front of the Banqueting House of the Palace of Whitehall on 30 January 1649. After the Restoration in 1660, nine of the surviving regicides not living in exile were executed and most others sentenced to life imprisonment.

After the regicide, Charles, Prince of Wales as the eldest son was publicly proclaimed King Charles II in the Royal Square of St. Helier, Jersey, on 17 February 1649 (after a first such proclamation in Edinburgh on 5 February 1649). It took longer for the news to reach the trans-Atlantic colonies, with the Somers Isles (also known as Bermuda) becoming the first to proclaim Charles II King on 5 July 1649.

=== Third English Civil War (1649–1651) ===
==== Ireland ====
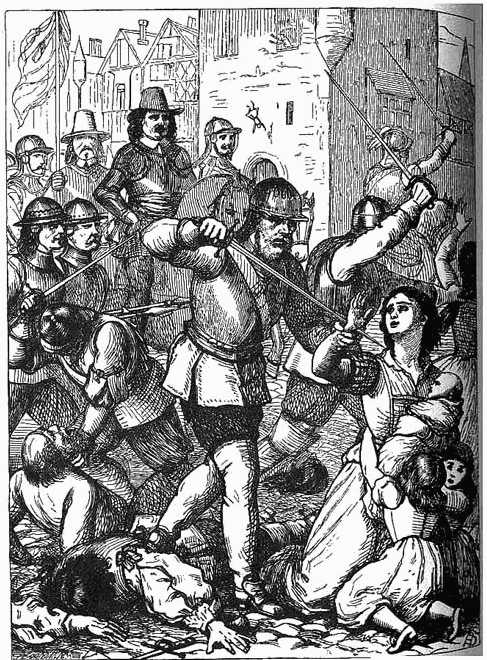
A 19th-century representation of the Massacre at Drogheda in Ireland in 1649

Ireland had undergone continual war since the rebellion of 1641, with most of the island controlled by the Irish Confederates. Increasingly threatened by the armies of the English Parliament after Charles I's arrest in 1648, the Confederates signed a treaty of alliance with the English Royalists. The joint Royalist and Confederate forces under James Butler, Duke of Ormonde tried to eliminate the Parliamentary army holding Dublin by laying siege in 1649, but their opponents routed them at the Battle of Rathmines (2 August 1649). Admiral Robert Blake, a former Member of Parliament, had blockaded Prince Rupert's fleet in Kinsale, enabling Oliver Cromwell to land at Dublin on 15 August 1649 with an army to quell the Royalist alliance.

Cromwell's suppression of the Royalists in Ireland in 1649 is still remembered by the Irish. After the Siege of Drogheda, the massacre of nearly 3,500 people – around 2,700 Royalist soldiers and 700 others, including civilians, prisoners, and Catholic priests (all of whom Cromwell claimed had carried arms) – became one of the historical memories that has driven Irish-English and Catholic-Protestant strife during the last three centuries. The Parliamentarian conquest of Ireland ground on for another four years until 1653, when the last Irish Confederate and Royalist troops surrendered. In the wake of the conquest, the victors confiscated almost all Irish Catholic-owned land and distributed it to Parliament's creditors, to Parliamentary soldiers who served in Ireland, and to English who had settled there before the war.

==== Scotland ====
The execution of Charles I altered the dynamics of the Civil War in Scotland, which had raged between Royalists and Covenanters since 1644. By 1649, the struggle had left the Royalists there in disarray and their erstwhile leader, James Graham, Marquess of Montrose, had gone into exile. At first, Charles II encouraged Montrose to raise a Highland army to fight on the Royalist side. When the Scottish Covenanters, who did not agree with the execution of Charles I and who feared for the future of Presbyterianism under the new Commonwealth, offered him the crown of Scotland, Charles abandoned Montrose to his enemies.

Montrose, who had raised a mercenary force in Norway, had already landed and could not abandon the fight. He did not succeed in raising many Highland clans and the Covenanters defeated his army at the Battle of Carbisdale in Ross-shire on 27 April 1650. The victors captured Montrose shortly afterwards and took him to Edinburgh. On 20 May the Scottish Parliament sentenced him to death and had him hanged the next day.

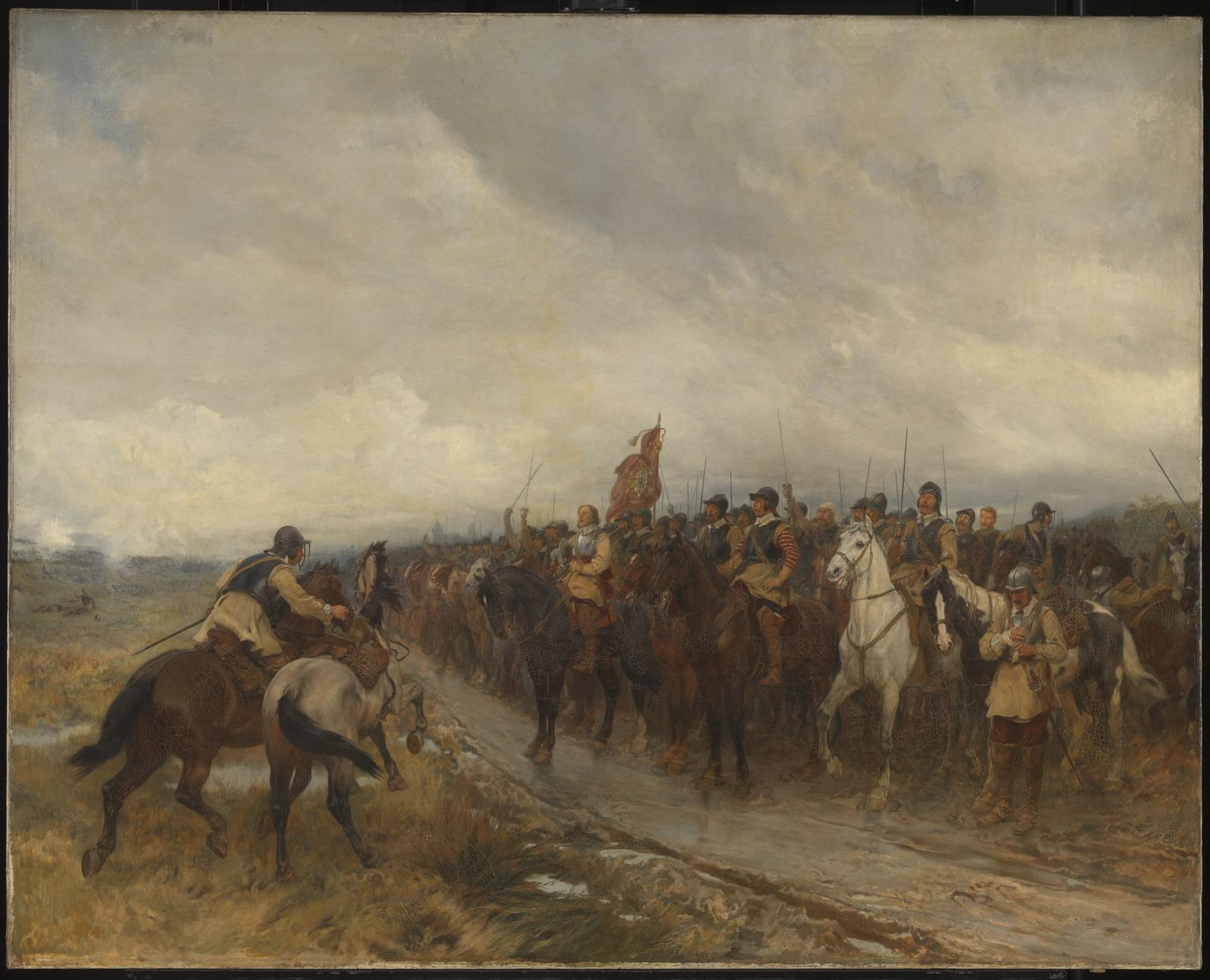
Cromwell at Dunbar, by Andrew Carrick Gow, 1886

Charles II landed in Scotland at Garmouth in Morayshire on 23 June 1650 and signed the 1638 National Covenant and the 1643 Solemn League and Covenant shortly after coming ashore. With his original Scottish Royalist followers and his new Covenanter allies, Charles II became the greatest threat facing the new English republic. In response to the threat, Cromwell left some of his lieutenants in Ireland to continue the suppression of the Irish Royalists and returned to England.

He arrived in Scotland on 22 July 1650 and proceeded to lay siege to Edinburgh. By the end of August, disease and a shortage of supplies had reduced his army, and he had to order a retreat towards his base at Dunbar. A Scottish army under the command of David Leslie tried to block the retreat, but Cromwell defeated them at the Battle of Dunbar on 3 September. Cromwell's army then took Edinburgh, and by the end of the year his army had occupied much of southern Scotland.

In July 1651, Cromwell's forces crossed the Firth of Forth into Fife and defeated the Scots at the Battle of Inverkeithing (20 July 1651). The New Model Army advanced towards Perth, which allowed Charles, at the head of the Scottish army, to move south into England. Cromwell followed Charles into England, leaving George Monck to finish the campaign in Scotland. Monck took Stirling on 14 August and Dundee on 1 September. The next year, 1652, saw a mopping up of the remnants of Royalist resistance, and under the terms of the "Tender of Union", the Scots received 30 seats in a united Parliament in London, with General Monck as the military governor of Scotland.

==== England ====
Although Cromwell's New Model Army had defeated a Scottish army at Dunbar, Cromwell could not prevent Charles II from marching from Scotland deep into England at the head of another Royalist army. They marched to the west of England where English Royalist sympathies were strongest, but although some English Royalists joined the army, they were far fewer in number than Charles and his Scottish supporters had hoped. Cromwell finally engaged and defeated the new Scottish king at Worcester on 3 September 1651.

==== Wales ====
For several reasons most of Wales was not as engaged in the English Civil Wars to the same degree as other parts of the British Isles. Wales was isolated from England, both physically and linguistically, so the Welsh were not as much engaged as England in the issues between the king and Parliament. The English considered Wales a remote land, with Welsh, not English, as the primary language. Since England had formally assimilated Wales into the kingdom, starting in 1536 formal agreements had been put in place under Henry VIII and continued under Charles I that allowed for Welsh local administrative authority and economic control, which allowed the Welsh to function to some degree independently. Another factor was the Puritan religion, which played a major role in the English Civil Wars but was not widely practised throughout Wales. Welsh Puritan religious dominance was found in northeast Wales near Wrexham, Denbighshire, and an indirect Puritan influence found along the southwestern coast near Haverfordwest, Pembroke, and Tenby due to a combination of a strong influence by the third earl of Essex and their strong trade relations with Bristol, England, a fervent Puritan stronghold. In addition, Wales was comparatively more rural in character than England at this time, and lacked the large number of urban settlements home to mercantile, trade, and manufacturing interests who were a bulwark of support for both Puritanism and eventually the Parliamentarian cause.

Many of the key Welsh Civil Wars leaders were from the gentry class holding Royalist sympathies, or from the Church. Those Welsh who did participate in the Civil Wars battles were underequipped, underfed, and not properly trained for warfare. The majority of Welsh followed the Protestant faith with a religious perspective that differed from the English puritan zeal. They were also leery of the Irish Catholics invading Wales. The Welsh also did not want to lose what they had, for the gentry were aware of the destruction the Thirty Years' War caused in Europe.

Most of those English Civil War battles where Wales was impacted occurred near the border with England and in south Wales. Some of the more significant engagements were:

- In Gloucester, England (not far from Wales) Lord Herbert of Raglan (Wales) had Welsh troops assisting the royalists trying to take Gloucester in March, August, and September 1643, but without success;
- In November 1643 Thomas Myddelton had secured the north Wales Royalist stronghold of Flintshire and the area east of Denbighshire, depriving Royalists based in Chester, England of their supplies. In response to this attack Archbishop John Williams, on behalf of the Royalists, responded to this attack by taking Wrexham from the Parliamentarians;
- Initially in the summer of 1643, Royalist forces under Richard Vaughan of Golden Grove, 2nd Earl of Carbery, who had been appointed lieutenant-general by the King, was successful in securing three of the southwestern Welsh counties; but in early 1644 Parliamentarians conducted a successful sea and land assault campaign on Pembroke, Haverfordwest, Milford Pil; and continuing on to Swansea and Cardiff. As a result of these Royalist failures the King replaced Carbery with Colonel Charles Gerard, 1st Earl of Macclesfield who was able to regain many of these lost territories in Cardiganshire and Carmarthenshire;
- On 18 September 1644 the first pitched battle on Welsh soil at Montgomery was a successful win for Myddelton;
- On 1 August 1645 the Royalist forces were once again defeated at Colby Moor;
- During the Second Civil War the Royalists were decisively defeated at the battle of St. Fagans near Cardiff, which was one of the last more significant battles.

In addition to the Civil Wars' impact on the monarchy and the changes in national leadership, unexpected outcomes of the English Civil Wars to Wales included a significant degradation of the country's road system, a deterioration of government administrative functions to the general population, destruction of castles with only the remnants of them remaining, and the desecration of churches.

==== Immediate aftermath ====
After the Royalist defeat at Worcester, Charles II escaped to France via safe houses and an oak tree. Parliament was left in de facto control of England. Resistance continued for a time in Ireland and Scotland, but with the pacification of England, resistance elsewhere did not threaten the military supremacy of the New Model Army and its Parliamentary paymasters.

== Political control ==
During the Wars, the Parliamentarians established a number of successive committees to oversee the war effort. The first, the Committee of Safety set up in July 1642, comprised 15 members of Parliament. After the Anglo-Scottish alliance against the Royalists, the Committee of Both Kingdoms replaced the Committee of Safety between 1644 and 1648. Parliament dissolved the Committee of Both Kingdoms when the alliance ended, but its English members continued to meet as the Derby House Committee. A second Committee of Safety then replaced it.

=== Episcopacy ===
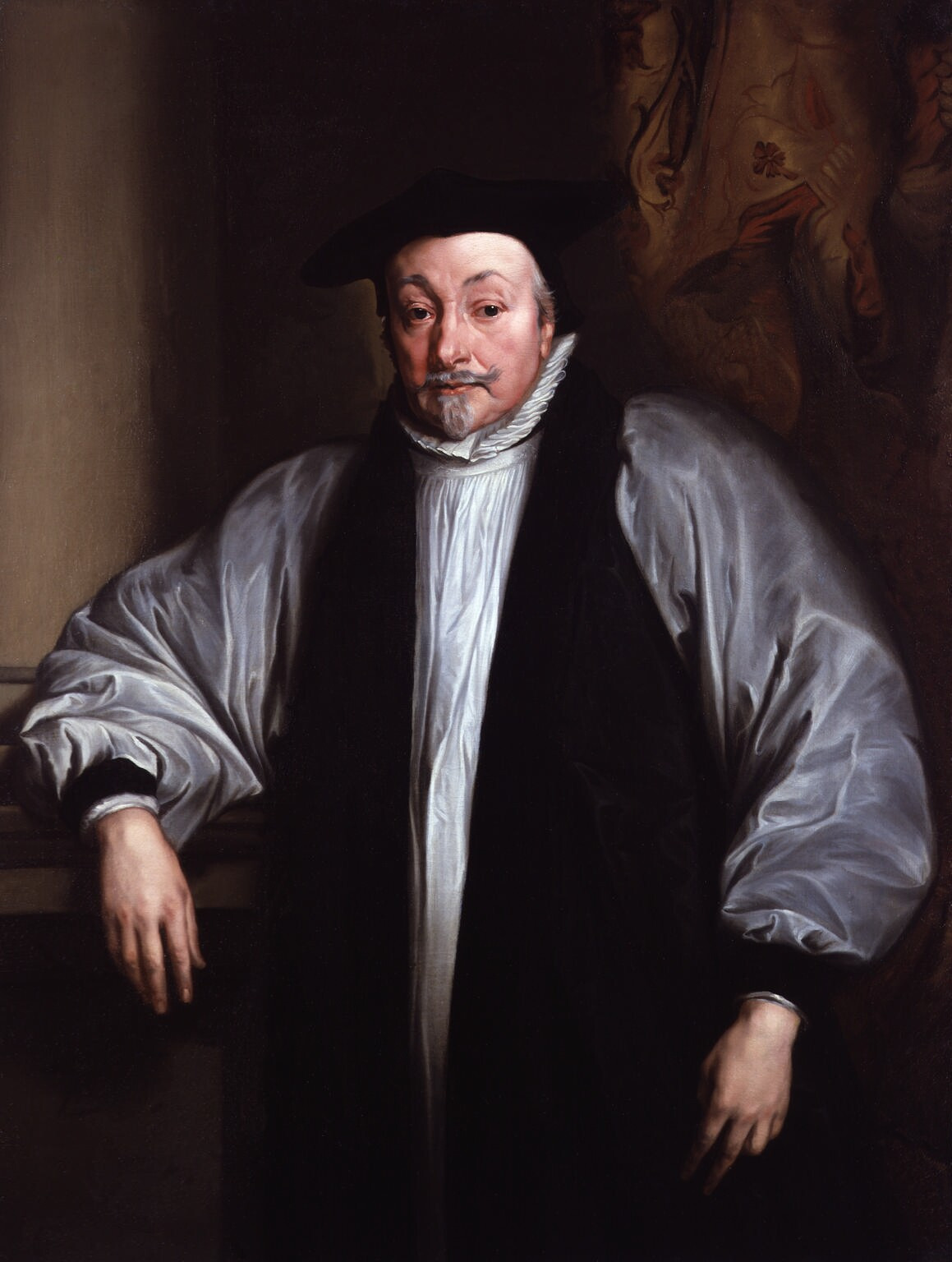
William Laud, Charles I's Archbishop of Canterbury.

During the English Civil War, the role of bishops as wielders of political power and upholders of the established church became a matter of heated political controversy. John Calvin of Geneva had formulated a doctrine of Presbyterianism, which held that the offices of presbyter and episkopos in the New Testament were identical; he rejected the more traditional doctrine of apostolic succession. Calvin's follower John Knox brought Presbyterianism to Scotland when the Scottish church was reformed in 1560. In practice, Presbyterianism meant that committees of elders had a substantial voice in church government, as opposed to merely being subjects to a ruling hierarchy.

This vision of at least partial democracy in ecclesiology paralleled the struggles between Parliament and the King. A body within the Puritan movement in the Church of England sought to abolish the office of bishop and remake the Church of England along Presbyterian lines. The Martin Marprelate tracts (1588–1589), applying the pejorative name of prelacy to the church hierarchy, attacked the office of bishop with satire that deeply offended Elizabeth I and her Archbishop of Canterbury John Whitgift. The vestments controversy also related to this movement, seeking further reductions in church ceremony, and labelling the use of elaborate vestments as "unedifying" and even idolatrous.

King James VI, reacting against the perceived contumacy of his Presbyterian Scottish subjects, adopted "No Bishop, no King" as a slogan. He tied the hierarchical authority of the bishop to the absolute authority he sought as King and viewed attacks on the authority of the bishops as attacks on his authority. Matters came to a head when Charles I appointed William Laud as Archbishop of Canterbury. Laud aggressively attacked the Presbyterian movement and sought to impose the full Book of Common Prayer. The controversy eventually led to Laud's impeachment for treason by a bill of attainder in 1645 and subsequent execution. Charles also attempted to impose episcopacy on Scotland. The Scots' violent rejection of bishops and liturgical worship sparked the Bishops' Wars in 1639–1640.

During the height of Puritan power under the Commonwealth and the Protectorate, episcopacy was formally abolished in the Church of England on 9 October 1646. The Church of England remained Presbyterian until the Restoration of the monarchy.

== English overseas possessions ==
During the English Civil War, the English overseas possessions became highly involved. In the Channel Islands, the island of Jersey and Castle Cornet in Guernsey supported the King until a surrender with honour in December 1651.

Although the newer, Puritan settlements in North America, notably Massachusetts (which still styles itself the "Commonwealth of Massachusetts"), were dominated by Parliamentarians, the older colonies sided with the Crown. Friction between Royalists and Puritans in Maryland came to a head in the Battle of the Severn. The Virginia Company's settlements, Bermuda and Virginia, as well as Antigua and Barbados, were conspicuous in their loyalty to the Crown. Bermuda's Independent Puritans were expelled, settling the Bahamas under William Sayle as the Eleutheran Adventurers. Parliament passed An Act for prohibiting Trade with the Barbadoes, Virginia, Bermuda and Antego in October 1650, which stated that:

...due punishment [be] inflicted upon the said Delinquents, do Declare all and every the said persons in Barbada's, Antego, Bermuda's and Virginia, that have contrived, abetted, aided or assisted those horrid Rebellions, or have since willingly joyned with them, to be notorious Robbers and Traitors, and such as by the Law of Nations are not to be permitted any manner of Commerce or Traffic with any people whatsoever; and do forbid to all manner of persons, Foreigners, and others, all manner of Commerce, Traffic and Correspondence whatsoever, to be used or held with the said Rebels in the Barbados, Bermuda's, Virginia and Antego, or either of them.

The Act also authorised Parliamentary privateers to act against English vessels trading with the rebellious colonies:

All Ships that Trade with the Rebels may be surprized. Goods and tackle of such ships not to be embezeled, till judgement in the Admiralty.; Two or three of the Officers of every ship to be examined upon oath.

Far to the North, Bermuda's regiment of Militia and its coastal batteries prepared to resist an invasion that never came. The Royalist party (known as "the Country"), with control of the coastal fortifications and the militia, was able to enforce its rule, replace the appointed Governor with one of its own members, and to force Independent Parliamentarians into exile. When it was learnt in Bermuda in 1650 that a new governor was to be sent to the colony, where the practice had been for some time that Governors were appointed from the leading men of the colony, militia officer Lieutenant Michael Burrows told Independent John Somersall that he might not be permitted to land. Somersall said he would venture his life to bring him in, and that the Independents were not altogether fools, for though they were disarmed, there were yet "other armes besides guns and bullets". Built-up inside the natural defence of a nearly impassable barrier reef, to fend off the might of Spain, these defences would have been a formidable obstacle for the Parliamentary fleet sent in 1651 under the command of Admiral George Ayscue to subdue the trans-Atlantic colonies, but after the fall of Barbados, the Bermudians made a separate peace that respected the internal status quo. The Parliament of Bermuda avoided the Parliament of England's fate during The Protectorate, becoming one of the oldest continuous legislatures in the world.

Virginia's population swelled with Cavaliers during and after the English Civil War. Even so, Virginia Puritan Richard Bennett was made Governor answering to Cromwell in 1652, followed by two more nominal "Commonwealth Governors". The loyalty of Virginia's Cavaliers to the Crown was rewarded after the 1660 Restoration of the Monarchy when Charles II dubbed it the Old Dominion.

== Casualties ==
Figures for casualties during this period are unreliable. Some attempt has been made to provide rough estimates.

In England, a conservative estimate is that roughly 100,000 people died from war-related disease during the three civil wars, plus at least 60,000 in Scotland. Historical records count 84,830 combat dead from the wars themselves. Counting in accidents and the two Bishops' wars, a "conservative" estimate of 190,000 dead is achieved, out of a total population of about five million. It is estimated that from 1638 to 1651, from a pre-war population of approximately 6 million (5 million in England and Wales and 1 million in Scotland) some 25% of all adult males in Britain served in the military at some point. Deaths amounted to 3.7 per cent of the total population in England and 6 per cent in Scotland.

As was typical for the era, most combat deaths occurred in minor skirmishes rather than large, pitched battles. There were a total of 645 engagements throughout the wars: 588 of these involved fewer than 250 casualties in total, with these 588 accounting for 39,838 fatalities (average count of less than 68) or nearly half of the conflict's combat deaths. There were only 9 major pitched battles (at least 1,000 fatalities) which in total accounted for 15% of casualties.

An anecdotal example of how high casualties in England may have been perceived is to be found in the posthumously published writing (generally titled The History of Myddle), by a Shropshire man, Richard Gough (lived 1635–1723) of Myddle near Shrewsbury, who, writing in about 1701, commented of men from his rural home parish who joined the Royalist forces: "And out of these three townes [sic - ie townships], Myddle, Marton and Newton, there went noe less than twenty men, of which number thirteen were kill'd in the warrs". Edited by David Hey. Originally published in 1831 as History and Antiquities of the Parish of Myddle. After listing those he recalled did not return home, four of whose exact fates were unknown, he concluded: "And if soe many dyed out of these 3 townes [townships] wee may reasonably guess that many thousands dyed in England in that warre."

Figures for Scotland are less reliable and should be treated with caution. Casualties include the deaths of prisoners-of-war in conditions that accelerated their deaths, with estimates of 10,000 prisoners not surviving or not returning home (8,000 captured during and immediately after the Battle of Worcester were deported to New England, Bermuda and the West Indies to work for landowners as indentured labourers). There are no figures to calculate how many died from war-related diseases, but if the same ratio of disease to battle deaths from English figures is applied to the Scottish figures, a not unreasonable estimate of 60,000 people is achieved, from a population of about one million.

Figures for Ireland are described as "miracles of conjecture". Certainly, the devastation inflicted on Ireland was massive, with the best estimate provided by William Petty, the father of English demography. Petty estimated that 112,000 Protestants and 504,000 Catholics were killed through plague, war and famine, giving an estimated total of 616,000 dead, out of a pre-war population of about one and a half million. Although Petty's figures are the best available, they are still acknowledged as tentative; they do not include an estimated 40,000 driven into exile, some of whom served as soldiers in European continental armies, while others were sold as indentured servants to New England and the West Indies. Many of those sold to landowners in New England eventually prospered, but many sold to landowners in the West Indies were worked to death.

These estimates indicate that England suffered a 4 per cent loss of population, Scotland a loss of 6 per cent, while Ireland suffered a loss of 41 per cent of its population. Putting these numbers into the context of other catastrophes helps to understand the devastation of Ireland in particular. The Great Famine of 1845–1852 resulted in a loss of 16 per cent of the population, while during the Soviet famine and Holodomor of 1932–33 the population of the Soviet Ukraine fell by 14 per cent.

== Popular gains ==
Ordinary people took advantage of the dislocation of civil society in the 1640s to gain personal advantages. The contemporary guild democracy movement won its greatest successes among London's transport workers. The old status quo began a retrenchment after the end of the First Civil War in 1646, and more especially after the Restoration in 1660, but some gains were long-term. The democratic element introduced into the Watermen's Company in 1642, for example, survived with vicissitudes until 1827.

Parliament adopted a policy of confiscating ("sequestrating") the estates of "delinquents" (active Royalists) in 1643, a policy carried out by local committees. Rural communities seized timber and other resources on the sequestrated estates of Royalists and Catholics, and on the estates of the royal family and church hierarchy. Some communities improved their conditions of tenure on such estates.

== Aftermath ==
The wars left England, Scotland, and Ireland among the few countries in Europe without a monarch. In the wake of victory, many of the ideals (and many idealists) became sidelined. The republican government of the Commonwealth of England ruled England (and later all of Scotland and Ireland) from 1649 to 1653 and from 1659 to 1660. Between the two periods, and due to in-fighting among various factions in Parliament, Oliver Cromwell ruled over the Protectorate as Lord Protector (effectively a military dictator) until his death in 1658. (Note: For a longer analysis of the relationship between Cromwell's position, the former monarchy and the military, see Sherwood 1997, pp. 7–11.)

On Oliver Cromwell's death, his son Richard became Lord Protector, but the Army had little confidence in him. After seven months the Army removed Richard. In May 1659 it re-installed the Rump. Military force shortly afterward dissolved this as well. After the second dissolution of the Rump, in October 1659, the prospect of a total descent into anarchy loomed, as the Army's pretense of unity dissolved into factions.

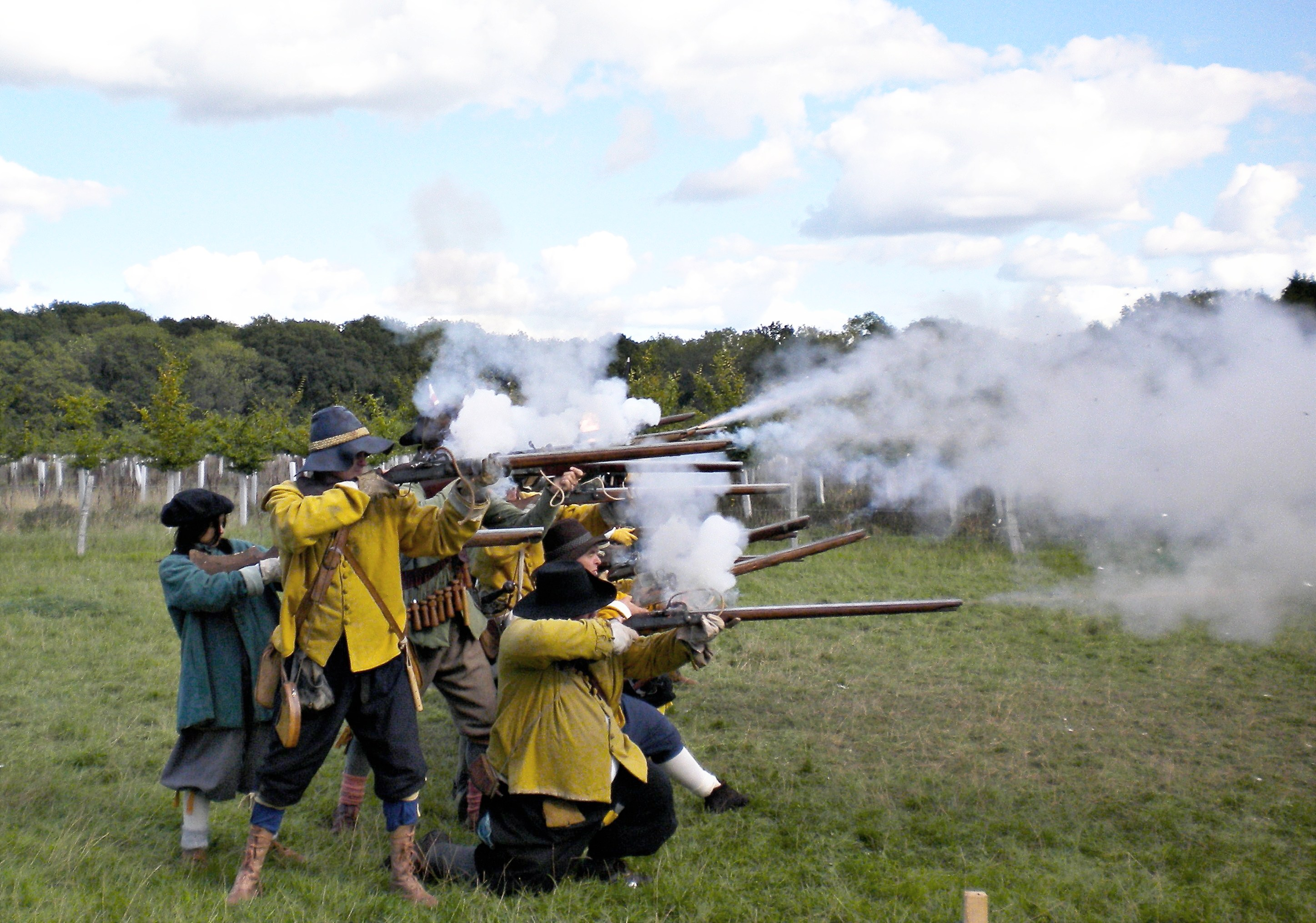
Muskets being fired at a civil war re-enactment

Into this atmosphere General George Monck, Governor of Scotland under the Cromwells, marched south with his army from Scotland. On 4 April 1660, in the Declaration of Breda, Charles II made known the conditions of his acceptance of the Crown of England. Monck organised the Convention Parliament, which met for the first time on 25 April 1660.

On 8 May 1660, it declared that Charles II had reigned as the lawful monarch since the execution of Charles I in January 1649. Charles returned from exile on 23 May 1660. On 29 May 1660, the populace in London acclaimed him as king. His coronation took place at Westminster Abbey on 23 April 1661. These events became known as the Restoration.

Although the monarchy was restored, it was still with the consent of Parliament. So the civil wars effectively set England and Scotland on course towards a parliamentary monarchy form of government. The outcome of this system was that the future Kingdom of Great Britain, formed in 1707 under the Acts of Union, managed to forestall the kind of revolution typical of European republican movements which generally resulted in total abolition of their monarchies. Thus, the United Kingdom was spared the wave of revolutions that occurred in Europe in the 1840s. Specifically, future monarchs became wary of pushing Parliament too hard, and Parliament effectively chose the line of royal succession in 1688 with the Glorious Revolution.

== Historical interpretations ==
=== Hobbes' Behemoth ===
Thomas Hobbes gave an early historical account of the English Civil War in his Behemoth, written in 1668 and published in 1681. He assessed the causes of the war to be the conflicting political doctrines of the time. Behemoth offered a uniquely historical and philosophical approach to naming the catalysts for the war. It also attempted to explain why Charles I could not hold his throne and maintain peace in his kingdom. Hobbes analysed the following aspects of English thought during the war: the opinions of divinity and politics that spurred rebellion; rhetoric and doctrine used by the rebels against the king; and how opinions about "taxation, the conscription of soldiers, and military strategy" affected the outcomes of battles and shifts of sovereignty.

Hobbes attributed the war to the novel theories of intellectuals and divines spread for their own pride of reputation. He held that clerical pretensions had contributed significantly to the troubles — "whether those of puritan fundamentalists, papal supremacists or divine right Episcopalians". Hobbes wanted to abolish the independence of the clergy and bring it under the control of the civil state. Some scholars suggest that Hobbes's Behemoth has not received its due as an academic work, being comparatively overlooked and under-rated in the shadow of the same author's Leviathan. Its scholarly reputation may have suffered because it takes the form of a dialogue, which, while common in philosophy, is rarely adopted by historians. Other factors that hindered its success include Charles II's refusing its publication and Hobbes' lack of empathy with views different from his own.

=== Whig and Marxist views ===
In the early decades of the 20th century, the Whig school was the dominant theoretical view. It explained the Civil War as resulting from centuries of struggle between Parliament (notably the House of Commons) and the Monarchy, with Parliament defending the traditional rights of Englishmen, while the Stuart monarchy continually attempted to expand its right to dictate law arbitrarily. The major Whig historian, S. R. Gardiner, popularised the idea that the English Civil War was a "Puritan Revolution" that challenged the repressive Stuart Church and prepared the way for religious toleration. Thus, Puritanism was seen as the natural ally of a people preserving their traditional rights against arbitrary monarchical power.

The Whig view was challenged and largely superseded by the Marxist school, which became popular in the 1940s, and saw the English Civil War as a bourgeois revolution. According to Marxist historian Christopher Hill:

The Civil War was a class war, in which the despotism of Charles I was defended by the reactionary forces of the established Church and conservative landlords, Parliament beat the King because it could appeal to the enthusiastic support of the trading and industrial classes in town and countryside, to the yeomen and progressive gentry, and to wider masses of the population whenever they were able by free discussion to understand what the struggle was really about.

=== Later views ===
In the 1970s, revisionist historians challenged both the Whig and the Marxist theories, notably in the 1973 anthology The Origins of the English Civil War (Conrad Russell ed.). These historians focused on the minutiae of the years immediately before the civil war, returning to the contingency-based historiography of Clarendon's History of the Rebellion and Civil Wars in England. This, it was claimed, demonstrated that patterns of war allegiance did not fit either Whig or Marxist theories. Parliament was not inherently progressive, nor the events of 1640 a precursor for the Glorious Revolution.

From the 1990s, a number of historians replaced the historical title "English Civil War" with "Wars of the Three Kingdoms" and "British Civil Wars", positing that the civil war in England cannot be understood apart from events in other parts of Britain and Ireland. King Charles I remains crucial, not just as King of England, but through his relationship with the peoples of his other realms. For example, the wars began when Charles forced an Anglican Prayer Book upon Scotland, and when this was met with resistance from the Covenanters, he needed an army to impose his will. However, this need of military funds forced Charles I to call an English Parliament, which was not willing to grant the needed revenue unless he addressed their grievances.

By the early 1640s, Charles was left in a state of near-permanent crisis management, confounded by the demands of the various factions. For example, Charles finally made terms with the Covenanters in August 1641, but although this might have weakened the position of the English Parliament, the Irish Rebellion of 1641 broke out in October 1641, largely negating the political advantage he had obtained by relieving himself of the cost of the Scottish invasion.

A number of revisionist historians such as William M. Lamont regarded the conflict as a religious war, with John Morrill (1993) stating: 'The English Civil War was not the first European revolution: it was the last of the Wars of Religion.' This view has been criticised by various pre-, post- and anti-revisionist historians. Glen Burgess (1998) examined political propaganda written by the Parliamentarian politicians and clerics at the time, noting that many were or may have been motivated by their Puritan religious beliefs to support the war against the 'Catholic' king Charles I, but tried to express and legitimise their opposition and rebellion in terms of a legal revolt against a monarch who had violated crucial constitutional principles and thus had to be overthrown. They even warned their Parliamentarian allies to not make overt use of religious arguments in making their case for war against the king.

However, in some cases it may be argued that they hid their pro-Anglican and anti-Catholic motives behind legal parlance, for example by emphasising that the Church of England was the legally established religion: 'Seen in this light, the defences of Parliament's war, with their apparent legal-constitutional thrust, are not at all ways of saying that the struggle was not religious. On the contrary, they are ways of saying that it was.' Burgess concluded: '[T]he Civil War left behind it just the sort of evidence that we could reasonably expect a war of religion to leave.'

== See also ==
- Chronology of the Wars of the Three Kingdoms
- Cromwell's Soldiers' Pocket Bible, booklet Cromwell issued to his army in 1643.
- Diggers
- English Dissenters
- English Revolution
- Gunpowder Plot
- The Levellers, a movement for political reform.
- Thirty Years' War, a defining event in European history during the reign of Charles I
- Timeline of the English Civil War, showing events leading up to, culminating in, and resulting from the English Civil Wars.
- William Hiseland, the last Royalist veteran of the Civil War
- List of English civil wars

== Sources ==
- Abbott, Jacob (2020). "Charles I: Downfall of Strafford and Laud".
- Adair, John (1976). A Life of John Hampden the Patriot 1594–1643. London: Macdonald and Jane's Publishers Limited. ISBN 978-0-354-04014-3.
- Ashelford, Jane (2009). The Art of Dress: Clothes and Society 1500–1914. National Trust. ISBN 978-1-9054-0079-9.
- Ashley, Maurice (1990). The English Civil War. Stoud: Sutton. ISBN 0-7509-0019-9.
- Aylmer, G. E. (1980). "The Historical Background". In Patrides, C. A.; Waddington, Raymond B. (eds.). The Age of Milton: Backgrounds to Seventeenth-Century Literature. Manchester University Press. pp. 1–33. ISBN 978-0-389-20052-9.
- Baker, Anthony (1986). A Battlefield Atlas of the English Civil War. Ian Allan. ISBN 978-0-7110-1654-5.
- Braddick, Michael (February 2018). God's Fury, England's Fire: A New History of the English Civil Wars. London: Penguin UK. ISBN 978-0-141-92651-3.
- Brett, A. C. A. (2008). Charles II and His Court. Read Books. ISBN 978-1-140-20445-9.
- Burgess, Glenn (1990). "Historiographical reviews on revisionism: an analysis of early Stuart historiography in the 1970s and 1980s". The Historical Journal. 33 (3): 609–627. doi:10.1017/s0018246x90000013. S2CID 145005781.
  —— (1998). "Was the English Civil War a War of Religion? The Evidence of Political Propaganda". Huntington Library Quarterly. 61 (2). University of California Press: 173–201. doi:10.2307/3817797. JSTOR 3817797.
- Burne, Alfred H.; Young, Peter (1998). The Great Civil War: A Military History of the First Civil War 1642–1646. Routledge. ISBN 978-1-317-86839-2.
- Burns, J. H. (1991). Cambridge History of Political Thought 1450-1700. Cambridge: Cambridge University Press. ISBN 0-521-24716-0.
- Carlton, Charles (1987). Archbishop William Laud. Routledge & Kegan Paul. ISBN 978-0-7102-0463-9.
  —— (1992). The Experience of the British Civil Wars. London: Routledge. ISBN 978-0-415-10391-6.
  —— (1995). Charles I: The Personal Monarch. Great Britain: Routledge. ISBN 978-0-415-12141-5.
  —— (1995a). Going to the wars: The experience of the British civil wars, 1638–1651. London: Routledge. ISBN 978-0-415-10391-6.
- Carpenter, Stanley D. M. (2005). Military Leadership in the British Civil Wars, 1642-1651: "The Genius of this Age". Psychology Press. ISBN 978-0-7146-5544-4.
- Chisholm, Hugh, ed. (1911). "Great Rebellion" . Encyclopædia Britannica. Vol. 12 (11th ed.). Cambridge University Press. p. 404.
- Clodfelter, Micheal (2002). Warfare and Armed Conflicts: A Statistical Reference to Casualty and Other Figures 1500–1999. McFarland & Co. ISBN 978-0-7864-1204-4.
- Croft, Pauline (2003). King James. Basingstoke: Palgrave Macmillan. ISBN 978-0-333-61395-5.
- Coward, Barry (1994). The Stuart Age. London: Longman. ISBN 978-0-582-48279-1. OL 4426162M.
- Dand, Charles Hendry (1972). The Mighty Affair: how Scotland lost her parliament. Oliver and Boyd.
- Davies, John (1993). A History of Wales (First English ed.). London: The Penguin Press. ISBN 0-713-99098-8.
- Durston, Christopher (1993). James I. London: Routledge. ISBN 978-0-4150-7779-8.
- Emberton, Wilfrid; Young, Peter (1978). Sieges of the Great Civil War, 1642–1646. Bell and Hyman. ISBN 978-0-7135-1983-9.
- Emberton, Wilfrid (1997). The English Civil War Day by Day. London: Grange Books. ISBN 1-84013-003-2.
- Fairfax, Thomas (18 May 1648). "19 May 1648: Letter from L. Fairfax, about the Disposal of the Forces, to suppress the Insurrections in Suffolk, Lancashire, and S. Wales; and for Belvoir Castle to be secured". 1648–1649. Journal of the House of Lords. Vol. 10. Institute of Historical Research. Archived from the original on 28 September 2007.
- Gardiner, Samuel R. (2006). History of the Commonwealth and Protectorate 1649–1660. Elibron Classics. ISBN 978-3-337-51446-4.
- Gaunt, Peter (2000). The English Civil War: the essential readings. Blackwell essential readings in history (illustrated ed.). Wiley-Blackwell. p. 60. ISBN 978-0-631-20809-9.
- Gentles, I. J. (12 July 2007). "Parliamentary Politics and the Politics of the Street: The London Peace Campaigns of 1642-3". Parliamentary History. 26 (2). doi:10.1353/pah.2007.0017. ISSN 1750-0206. S2CID 201772247.
- Goldsmith, M. M. (1966). Hobbes's Science of Politics. Ithaca, NY: Columbia University Press. pp. x–xiii.
- Gough, Richard (1981). The History of Myddle. London: Penguin Books. ISBN 0-14-00-5841-9.
- Gregg, Pauline (1981). King Charles I. London: Dent.
  —— (1984). King Charles I. Berkeley: University of California Press.
- Hibbert, Christopher (1968). Charles I. London: Weidenfeld and Nicolson.
  —— (1993). Cavaliers & Roundheads: the English Civil War, 1642–1649. Scribner. ISBN 978-0-246-13632-9.
- Hobbes, Thomas (1839). The English Works of Thomas Hobbes of Malmesbury. London: J. Bohn. p. 220.
- Hollis Hallett, A. C. (2005). 1612-1669. Bermuda Under the Somers Isles Company: Civil Records. Vol. I. Bermuda: A joint publication of Juniperhill Press and Bermuda Maritime Museum Press. ISBN 0-921992-14-9. "1652 Dec Assizes Civil Actions"
- Hill, Christopher (1972). The World Turned Upside Down: Radical ideas during the English Revolution. London: Viking.
- Hughes, Ann (1985). "The king, the parliament, and the localities during the English Civil War". Journal of British Studies. 24 (2): 236–263. doi:10.1086/385833. JSTOR 175704. S2CID 145610725.
  —— (1991). The Causes of the English Civil War. London: Macmillan. ISBN 1-349-27110-1.
- James, Lawrence (2003) [2001]. Warrior Race: A History of the British at War. New York: St. Martin's Press. p. 187. ISBN 978-0-312-30737-0.
- Jenkins, Geraint H. (1987). The Foundations of Modern Wales, 1642-1780. Oxford University Press. ISBN 0-19-821734-X.
- John, Terry (2008). The Civil War in Pembrokeshire. Logaston Press. ISBN 1-904396-90-9.
- Johnston, William Dawson (1901). The history of England from the accession of James the Second. Vol. I. Boston and New York: Houghton, Mifflin and company. pp. 83–86.
- Kaye, Harvey J. (1995). The British Marxist historians: an introductory analysis. Palgrave Macmillan. ISBN 978-0-312-12733-6.
- Keeble, N. H. (2002). The Restoration: England in the 1660s. Oxford: Blackwell. ISBN 0-470-75816-3.
- Kelsey, Sean (2003). "The Trial of Charles I". English Historical Review. 118 (477): 583–616. doi:10.1093/ehr/118.477.583.
- Kennedy, D. E. (2000). The English Revolution, 1642–1649. London: Macmillan. ISBN 0-312-23063-X.
- Kenyon, J. P. (1978). Stuart England. Harmondsworth: Penguin Books.
- King, Peter (July 1968). "The Episcopate during the Civil Wars, 1642–1649". The English Historical Review. 83 (328): 523–537. doi:10.1093/ehr/lxxxiii.cccxxviii.523. JSTOR 564164.
- Kirby, Michael (22 January 1999). The trial of King Charles I – defining moment for our constitutional liberties (PDF). speech to the Anglo-Australasian Lawyers association.
- Kraynak, Robert P. (1990). History and Modernity in the Thought of Thomas Hobbes. Ithaca, NY: Cornell University Press. p. 33. doi:10.7591/9781501745997. ISBN 978-1-5017-4599-7.
- Leniham, Pádraig (2008). Consolidating Conquest: Ireland 1603–1727. Harlow: Pearson Education. ISBN 0-582-77217-6.
- Lindley, Keith (1997). Popular politics and religion in Civil War London. Scolar Press. ISBN 1-85928-343-8.
- Lodge, Richard (2007). The History of England – From the Restoration to the Death of William III (1660–1702). Read Books. ISBN 1-330-51566-8.
- Macgillivray, Royce (1970). "Thomas Hobbes's History of the English Civil War A Study of Behemoth". Journal of the History of Ideas. 31 (2): 179–198. doi:10.2307/2708544. JSTOR 2708544.
- McClelland, J. S. (1996). A History of Western Political Thought. London: Routledge. ISBN 0-415-11962-6.
- Newman, P. R. (2006) [1998]. Atlas of the English Civil War (1st ed.). London: Routledge. ISBN 978-0415196109.
- Norton, Mary Beth (2011). Separated by Their Sex: Women in Public and Private in the Colonial Atlantic World. Cornell University Press. p. ~93. ISBN 978-0-8014-6137-8.
- Ohlmeyer, Jane (2002). "Civil Wars of the Three Kingdoms". History Today. Archived from the original on 5 February 2008.
- O'Riordan, Christopher (1993). "Popular Exploitation of Enemy Estates in the English Revolution". History. 78 (253): 184–200. doi:10.1111/j.1468-229x.1993.tb01577.x. Archived from the original on 26 October 2009.
- Outram, Quentin (Summer 2002). "The Demographic Impact of Early Modern Warfare". Social Science History. 26 (2). JSTOR 40267778.
- Pipes, Richard (1999). Property and Freedom. New York: Alfred A. Knopf. ISBN 0-375-40498-8.
- Purkiss, Diane (2007). The English Civil War: A People's History. London: Harper Perennial. ISBN 0-00-715062-8.
- Reid, Stuart; Turner, Graham (2004). Dunbar 1650: Cromwell's most famous victory. Oxford: Osprey. ISBN 978-184-176774-1.
- Rosner, Lisa; Theibault, John (2000). A Short History of Europe, 1600–1815: Search for a Reasonable World (1st ed.). New York: M. E. Sharpe. ISBN 978-0-765-60327-2.
- Royle, Trevor (2006) [2004]. Civil War: The Wars of the Three Kingdoms 1638–1660. London: Abacus. ISBN 978-0-349-11564-1.
- Russell, Geoffrey, ed. (1998). Beginnings to 1901. Who's who in British History. Routledge. p. 417. ISBN 1-884964-90-7.
- Russell, Conrad, ed. (1973). The Origins of the English Civil War. Problems in focus series. London: Macmillan. OCLC 699280.
- "Second and third English Civil Wars". Encyclopædia Britannica. 2 December 2016.
- Seel, Graham E. (1999). The English Wars and Republic, 1637–1660. London: Routledge. ISBN 978-0-203-97676-0.
- Sharp, David (2000). England in crisis 1640–60. Heinemann. ISBN 978-0-435-32714-9.
- Sherwood, Roy Edward (1992). The Civil War in the Midlands, 1642–1651. Alan Sutton. ISBN 978-0-750-90167-3.
  —— (1997). Oliver Cromwell: King In All But Name, 1653–1658 (1st ed.). New York: St Martin's Press. ISBN 978-0-750-91066-8.
- Smith, David L. (1999). The Stuart Parliaments 1603–1689. Vol. 31. London: Arnold. doi:10.2307/2671360. JSTOR 2671360.
- Smith, Lacey Baldwin (1983). This realm of England, 1399 to 1688 (3rd ed.). D. C. Heath. p. 251.
- Sommerville, Johann P. (1992). Hexter, Jack H. (ed.). "Parliament and Liberty from the Reign of Elizabeth to the English Civil War". Journal of British Studies. Cambridge University Press: 65, 71, 80. JSTOR 175996.
  —— (13 November 2012). Thomas Hobbes. University of Wisconsin-Madison. Archived from the original on 4 July 2017.
- Stoyle, Mark (17 February 2011). History – British History in depth: Overview: Civil War and Revolution, 1603–171. BBC.
- Stoyle, Mark (December 2000). "English 'Nationalism', Celtic Particularism, And the English Civil War". The Historical Journal. 43 (4). Cambridge University Press. doi:10.1017/S0018246X00001369. JSTOR 3020883. S2CID 159953456.
- Tincey, John (2012). Ironsides: English Cavalry 1588–168. Oxford: Osprey. ISBN 1-84176-213-X.
- Trevelyan, George Macaulay (2002). England Under the Stuarts. London: Routledge. ISBN 0-415-27785-X.
- Upham, Charles Wentworth (2009) [1836]. Jared Sparks (ed.). Life of Sir Henry Vane, Fourth Governor of Massachusetts in The Library of American Biography. New York: Harper & Brothers. ISBN 978-1-115-28802-6. OL 23473550M.
- Walter, John (1999). Understanding Popular Violence in the English Revolution: The Colchester Plunderers. Cambridge: Cambridge University Press. ISBN 978-0-521-02270-5.
- Wanklyn, Malcolm; Jones, Frank (2005). A Military History of the English Civil War, 1642–1646: Strategy and Tactics (1st ed.). Harlow: Pearson Education. doi:10.4324/9781315835617. ISBN 978-1-315-83561-7.
- Wedgwood, C. V. (1970). The King's War: 1641–1647. London: Fontana.
- Weiser, Brian (2003). "Charles II and the Politics of Access". The English Historical Review. 119 (483). Woodbridge: Boydell: 1058–1059. doi:10.1093/ehr/119.483.1058-a.
- Williams, Glanmor (1987). Recovery, Reorientation, And Reformation: Wales, C. 1415 – 1642. New York: Oxford University Press. ISBN 978-0-198-21733-6. OCLC 15488908.
- Worden, Blair (2009). The English Civil Wars, 1640–1660. London: Weidenfeld & Nicolson. ISBN 978-0-7538-2691-1.
- Young, Pete; Holmes, Richard (1974). The English Civil War: a military history of the three civil wars 1642–1651. Eyre Methuen.
- Young, Peter (1977) [1973]. The English Civil War Armies. Reading: Osprey. OCLC 505954051.

Attribution:

- This article incorporates text from a publication now in the public domain: Atkinson, Charles Francis (1911), "Great Rebellion", in Chisholm, Hugh (ed.), Encyclopædia Britannica, vol. 12 (11th ed.), Cambridge University Press, p. 417
