= Caballero =

Caballero (plural: caballeros), the Spanish word for horseman, knight or gentleman, may also refer to an indigenous or Hispanic vaquero cowboy in Northern Mexico (New Spain), New Mexico and the Southwestern United States. Other things the term can refer to:

== People ==
- Caballero (surname), a list of people
- Caballero, a Mescalero chief

== Arts, entertainment, and media ==
- El Caballero, a Seattle-based superhero associated with the Rain City Superhero Movement
- Guy Caballero, a character on the television series SCTV
- Caballero, a 1981 album by the German disco group Arabesque
- Cabellero (magazine), a defunct Mexican men's magazine
- Caballero: A Historical Novel, an American novel by Jovita González and Eve Raleigh
- "Cabellero", a song from Middle of Nowhere by Kacey Musgraves
- "El Caballero del Fútbol", a title attributed to Colombian footballer Andrés Escobar

== Brands and companies ==
- Caballero (cigarette), a Dutch brand
- Caballero Home Video, an American pornographic film studio
- GMC Caballero, a car/truck hybrid, twin to the Chevrolet El Camino from 1978 to 1987

== Other uses ==
- Caballero, Coclé, Panama
- Caballero (cycling team), a Dutch professional cycling team
