= José Manuel Caballero Serrano =

Spanish politician (born 1970)

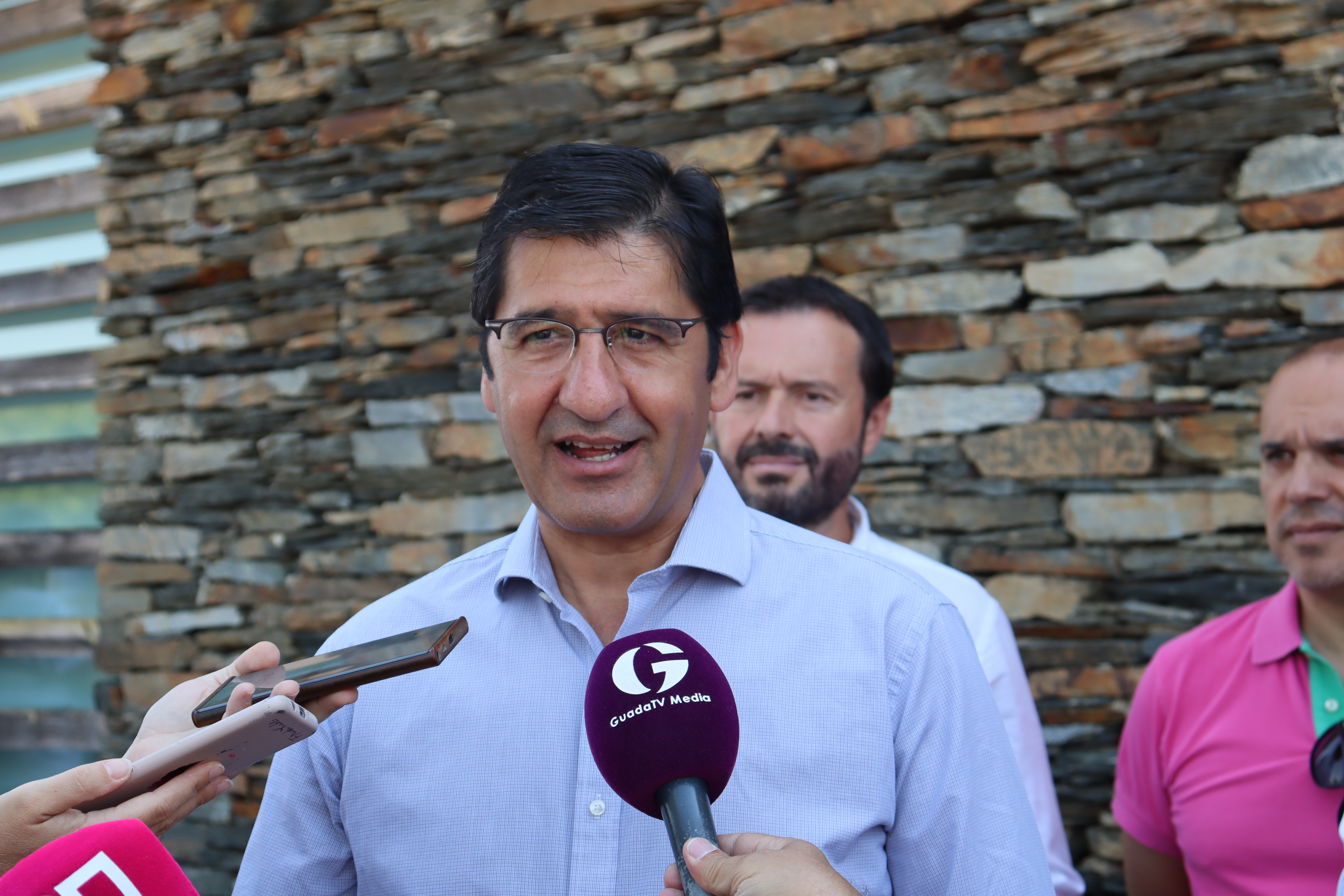
- Caballero in 2024

President of the Provincial Deputation of Ciudad Real
- In office 27 June 2015 – 1 July 2023
- Preceded by: Nemesio de Lara Guerrero
- Succeeded by: Miguel Ángel Valverde Menchero

Member of the Congress of Deputies
- In office 18 March 1996 – 18 January 2000
- Constituency: Ciudad Real

Personal details
- Born: 6 June 1970 (age 55)
- Party: Spanish Socialist Workers' Party

José Manuel Caballero Serrano (born 6 June 1970) is a Spanish politician serving as vice president of the Regional Government of Castilla–La Mancha since 2023. From 2015 to 2023, he served as president of the Provincial Deputation of Ciudad Real. From 1996 to 2000, he was a member of the Congress of Deputies.
