= Pino Caballero Gil =

Spanish mathematician (born 1968)

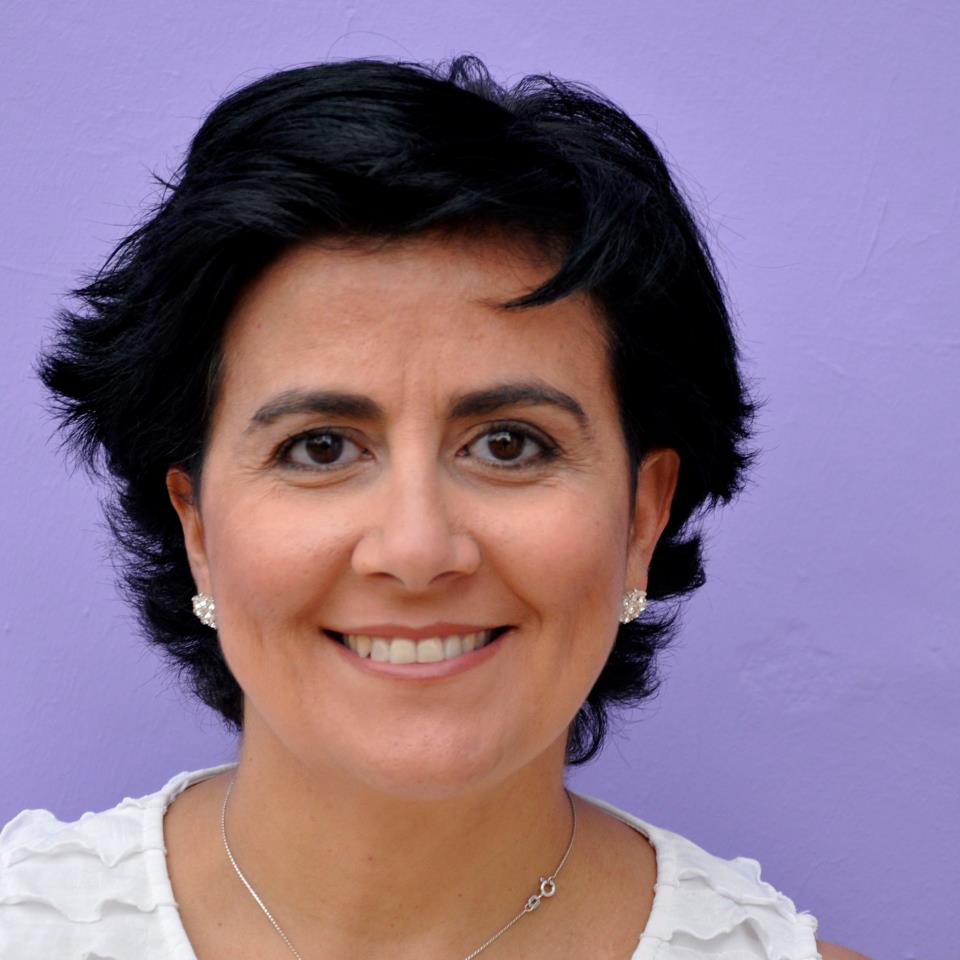
- Born: Las Palmas
- Scientific career
- Workplaces: University of La Laguna

Pino Caballero Gil (born November 29, 1968) is a Spanish scientist. She is a professor in Computer Science and Artificial Intelligence at the University of La Laguna (ULL) where she coordinates the CryptULL cryptology research group.

== Biography ==
She received her degree in mathematics from the ULL in 1990, and her Ph.D. from the same university in 1995. She is a professor in Computer Science and Artificial Intelligence since 2015. Her research focuses on cryptography, cryptanalysis, cryptographic protocols, Wireless communications security, pseudorandom number generator, strong authentication, and secure mobile applications.

Since 1998, she coordinates the CryptULL group of research in cryptology at ULL. She has participated in 47 national and international research projects. Caballero is a founding member of the Spanish Network of Excellence on Cybersecurity Research. She is a member of the Instituto Universitario de Desarrollo Regional (University Institute for Regional Development) and the Instituto Universitario de Estudios de la Mujer.

In 2019, she was an unsuccessful candidate for rector at ULL. She gave a plenary lecture during Spanish Meeting on Cryptology and Information Security (RECSI) 2022 at the University of Cantabria.

== Awards and honours ==
- In 2017, she received the Award of the Instituto Universitario de Estudios de la Mujer, ULL.
- In 1998, she received the Premio Día de Canarias para Jóvenes Investigadores.
- She also received the "Proyecto Empresarial" Award from the Fyde-Fundación CajaCanarias.
