= Alberto Caballero (astronomer) =

Spanish astronomer (born c. 1991)

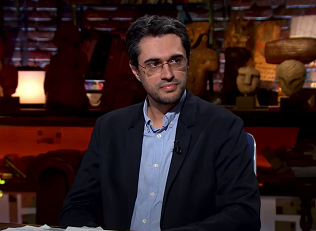
- Born: c. 1991; Edinburgh, Scotland
- Education: University of Vigo

Alberto Caballero is a Spanish astronomer and science communicator. He is known for having identified a Sun-like star in the sky region where the Wow! signal came from as one of the possible sources of the radio signal. Caballero is also known for founding and coordinating the Habitable Exoplanet Hunting Project, an international effort consisting of more than 30 observatories searching for nearby potentially habitable exoplanets. Data is collected 24/7 from specific stars by observatories located both in the Northern and Southern hemispheres, and an initial list of exoplanet candidates was made public in 2020.

== Work ==
Caballero's candidate for the Wow! signal was presented in 2020. The star is regarded as the most similar to the Sun out of the three solar analogs found inside the sky region. It has a temperature, radius, and luminosity similar to the Sun. The finding drew the attention of the SETI Institute, which stated that "astronomer Alberto Caballero might have pinpointed the host star", whereas Yuri Milner, founder of Breakthrough Initiatives, stated that ''it's intriguing that there's a Sun-like star in the right place to be its source''.

As a response to the finding, in May 2022 Breakthrough Listen conducted the first targeted search for the Wow! Signal in its first collaboration between the Green Bank Telescope and the SETI Institute. The observations lasted 1 hour from Greenbank, 35 minutes from the Allen Telescope Array, and 10 minutes simultaneously. No technosignature candidates were found.

His work was reported by the media again in 2020 after he released a spacecraft design intended for crewed interstellar travel. The concept, which draws from the already proposed Bussard ramjet and laser-pushed lightsail of Robert Forward, combines some of their features by using solar propulsion for acceleration and electromagnetic force for deceleration. The proposal was featured in a 2021 edition of the British Interplanetary Society magazine Spaceflight.

In 2022, Caballero made a public appearance on the Spanish TV program Cuarto Milenio and highlighted that the Sun-like star he identified two years before is located only 100 light years away from the most likely distance at which we can expect to find the nearest extraterrestrial civilization according to SETI researcher Claudio Maccone.

In a study released in 2022, he estimated the number of malicious civilizations in the Milky Way as well as the probability of extraterrestrial invasion. Results suggested the existence of less than one malicious Type-1 civilization in the Kardashev scale capable of nearby interstellar travel with a probability of invasion two orders of magnitude lower than the impact probability of a planet-killer asteroid. When interviewed by the Spanish TV program Zapeando, Caballero stated that 'while around 5% of the population on Earth is psychopathic, on another planet it could be a higher percentage'.

== Personal life ==
Caballero was born in Edinburgh in 1991. He spent his childhood in the capital of Scotland until his family moved to Vigo, a Spanish city on the north-Atlantic west coast of the country. Caballero studied criminology at the University of Santiago de Compostela, and conflict resolution at the University of Vigo, in Spain. He became interested in astronomy at a young age, and in 2017 he started a YouTube channel intended for scientific dissemination and to present his research to the public. Two years later, in 2019, he became involved in the coordination of astronomical observatories.
