= Caballero (magazine) =

Men's magazine in Mexico (1966–1997)

- Cover of the May 1966 issue

Caballero (meaning Gentleman in English) was a magazine for men published in Mexico City. It existed between 1966 and 1997. Raymundo Ampudia was its director.
