= Carlos Caballero (weightlifter) =

Colombian weightlifter

Carlos Caballero (born 15 February 1927) is a Colombian former weightlifter who competed in the 1956 Summer Olympics and in the 1960 Summer Olympics.

Although he did not begin weightlifting until age 24, Caballero went on to win 12 national championships, two South American championships and two Central American and Caribbean Championships, competing in the middleweight class. He was selected for three Olympics: 1956, 1960 and 1964, though he was unable to compete at the last one due to insufficient funding. He continued his career until 1970 and subsequently was a coach.

Caballero has the distinction of being the first Colombian weightlifter at the Olympics. He was awarded a lifetime achievement medal by Acord Atlántico in 2019.
