= Provincial Deputation of Ciudad Real =

Government institution in Spain

- Diputación Provincial de Ciudad Real
- Coat of arms

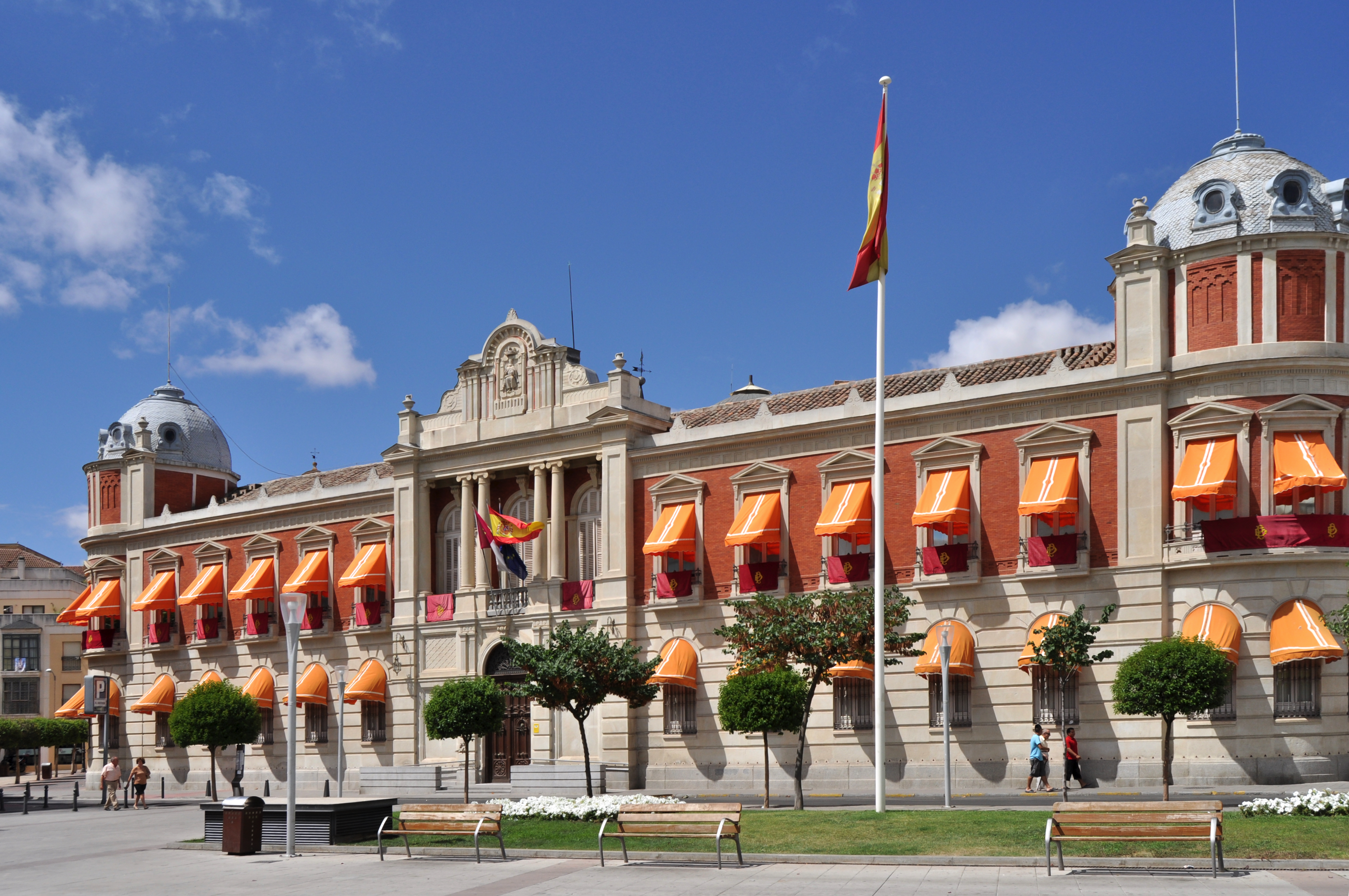

Provincial Deputation overview
- Formed: 5 November 1835
- Jurisdiction: Province of Ciudad Real
- Headquarters: Palacio de la Diputación Provincial de Ciudad Real. Ciudad Real, Spain

The Provincial Deputation of Ciudad Real (Spanish: Diputación Provincial de Ciudad Real) or Provincial Council of Ciudad Real is the institution charged with the government and administration of the Spanish province of Ciudad Real.

== History ==
Ciudad Real was first defined as province in the 1822 territorial division, during the (brief) Trienio liberal, with boundaries similar to the current ones. There is no evidence of activity of the provincial deputation in that time, however. After the death of Ferdinand VII, following the 1833 territorial reorganization carried out by Javier de Burgos and under the aegis of the 1834 Royal Statute, the current provincial deputations were created. In the case of Ciudad Real, the provincial corporation was constituted on 5 November 1835, following a 21 September 1835 decree.

== Structure ==
The composition of its deliberative assembly or plenary (pleno) is indirectly determined on the basis of its election by the elected municipal councillors of all ayuntamientos. The partisan distribution of the plenary is determined as per the D'Hondt apportionment of the results of the sum of municipal elections in each one of the judicial districts (as of 2019: Ciudad Real, Daimiel, Manzanares, Alcázar de San Juan, Villanueva de los Infantes, Valdepeñas, and Puertollano).

Vis-à-vis the 2019 local elections, the size of the plenary was reduced from 27 to 25 provincial deputies, in accordance with the decreasing population of the province, then below 500,000.

The president of the deputation is elected by the plenary from among its members at the constitutive session of the provincial corporation that follows the constitutive session of the municipal corporations (the ayuntamientos). The candidate needs to command a qualified majority in a first round of voting or a simple majority in a second round.
