= Solar One (interstellar) =

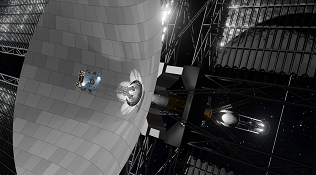
Solar One by Marco Purich

Solar One is a proposed spacecraft that would combine beamed-powered propulsion, electromagnetic propulsion, and nuclear propulsion. The spacecraft would include a light sail, a laser system, a Bussard scoop, and a compact nuclear fusion reactor.

Large mirrors would be assembled in orbit and sent close to the Sun to collect sufficient light to propel the light sail. The on board laser would help the Bussard scoop collect hydrogen to power the nuclear reactor which, in turn, would power both the laser and the electromagnetic scoop to decelerate the spacecraft.

The main challenges are building large parabolic mirrors as well as reducing the weight of the on board laser system and compact nuclear reactor.
