= Spanish Network of Excellence on Cybersecurity Research =

Spanish research initiative

- Red de Excelencia Nacional de Investigación en Ciberseguridad
- Type: Association
- Established: 2016
- Location: Spain
- Website: https://www.renic.es

The Spanish Network of Excellence on Cybersecurity Research (RENIC), is a research initiative to promote cybersecurity interests in Spain.

== Members ==
=== Board of Directors (2018) ===
- President: Universidad de Málaga
- Vice president: CSIC
- Treasurer: Universidad Politécnica de Madrid
- Secretary: Universidad de Granada
- Vocals: Tecnalia, Universidad de La Laguna and Universidad de Modragón

=== Board of Directors (2016) ===
- President: Universidad Carlos III de Madrid
- Vice president: Universidad Politécnica de Madrid
- Treasurer: Universidad de Granada
- Secretary: Universidad de León
- Vocals: Gradiant, Tecnalia, Universidad de Málaga

=== Founding Members ===
- Centro Andaluz de Innovación y Tecnologías de la Información y las Comunicaciones (CITIC).
- Consejo Superior de Investigaciones Científicas (CSIC).
- Centro Tecnolóxico de Telecomunicaciones de Galicia (Gradiant).
- Instituto Imdea Software.
- Instituto Nacional de Ciberseguridad (INCIBE).
- Mondragón Unibertsitatea.
- Tecnalia.
- Universidad Carlos III de Madrid.
- Universidad Castilla la Mancha.
- Universidad de Granada.
- Universidad de la Laguna.
- Universidad de León.
- Universidad de Málaga.
- Universidad de Murcia.
- Universidad de Vigo.
- Universidad Internacional de la Rioja.
- Universidad Politécnica de Madrid.
- Universidad Rey Juan Carlos.

=== Members ===
- Consejo Superior de Investigaciones Científicas (CSIC).
- Centro Tecnolóxico de Telecomunicaciones de Galicia (Gradiant).
- Instituto Imdea Software.
- Instituto Nacional de Ciberseguridad (INCIBE).
- Mondragón Unibertsitatea.
- Tecnalia.
- Universidad Carlos III de Madrid.
- Universidad de Castilla-La Mancha.
- Universidad de Granada.
- Universidad de la Laguna.
- Universidad de León.
- Universidad de Málaga.
- Universidad de Murcia.
- Universidad de Vigo.
- Universidad Politécnica de Madrid.
- Universidad Rey Juan Carlos.
- Universitat Oberta de Catalunya.
- IKERLAN.

=== Honorary Members ===
- Centre for the Development of Industrial Technology (CDTI). (2017)
- Instituto Nacional de Ciberseguridad (INCIBE). (2016)

== Initiatives and Participations ==
- RENIC is ECSO member, and is also a member of its board of directors.
- A collaboration agreement between RENIC and the Innovative Business Cluster on Cybersecurity (AEI Cybersecurity) has been signed.
- RENIC is pleased to sponsor the Cybersecurity Research National Conferences (JNIC) JNIC2017 edition, organized by Universidad Rey Juan Carlos.
- RENIC is pleased to announce the publication of the online version of the Catalog and knowledge map of cybersecurity research
