= Siege of Pembroke =

Battle of the Second English Civil War

Coordinates: 51.67679°N 4.92063°W

- Part of the Second English Civil War
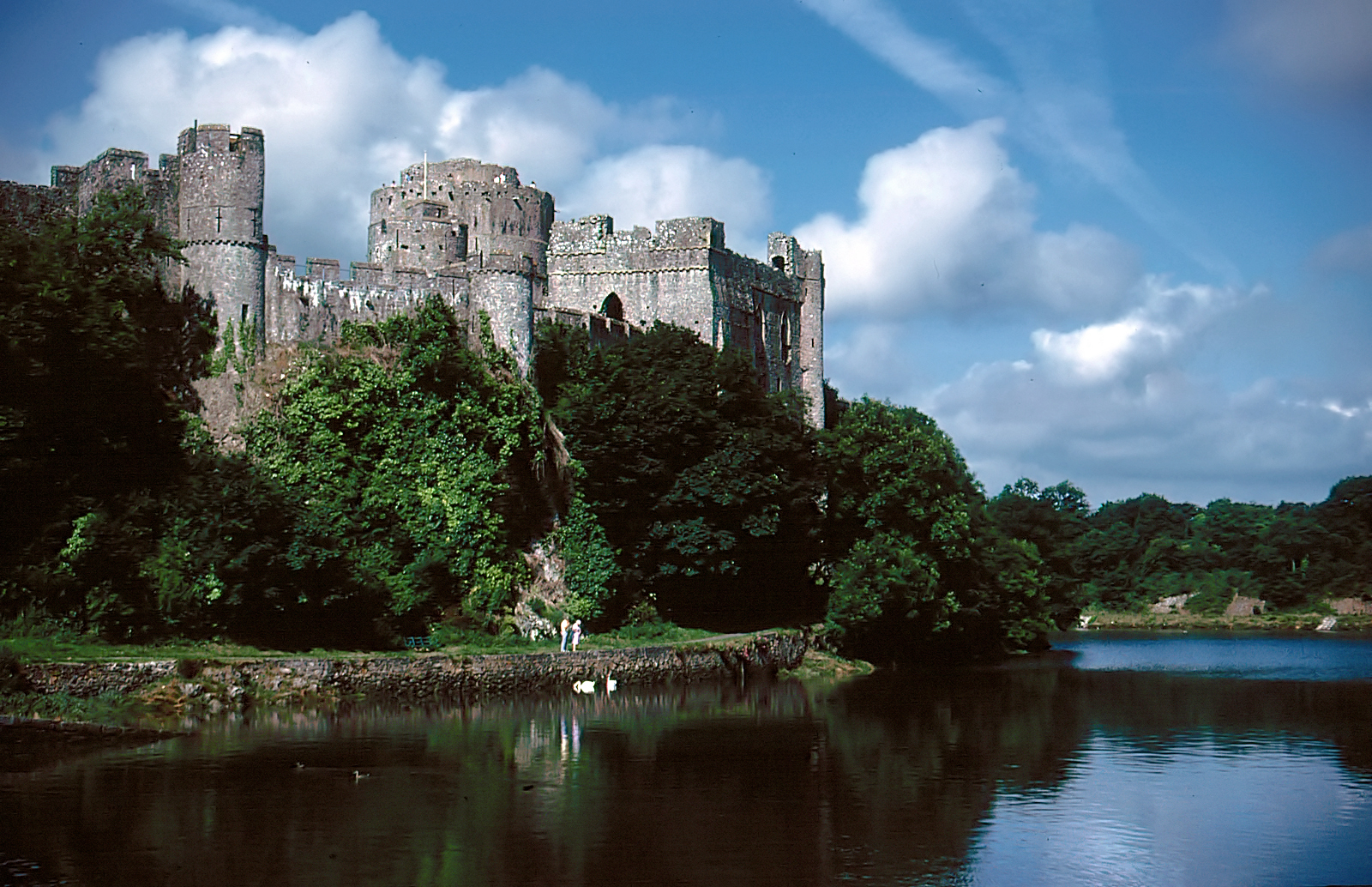
- The Northwest side of Pembroke Castle
Date	31 May–11 July 1648
Location	Pembroke Castle, Wales
Result	Parliamentarian victory

Belligerents
Royalists	Parliamentarians

Commanders and leaders
Gen. R. Laugharne (surrendered); Col. Rice Powell (surrendered); Col. John Poyer (executed)	Oliver Cromwell

Casualties and losses
30+ killed	Unknown
- Wales

The siege of Pembroke took place in 1648 during the Second English Civil War. In the engagement, Parliamentarian troops led by Oliver Cromwell besieged Pembroke Castle in Wales. The Castle had become a refuge for rebellious Parliamentarian soldiers after the end of the First English Civil War.

== Background ==
In April 1648, Parliamentarian troops in Wales, who had not been paid for a long time, staged a Royalist rebellion under the command of the Colonel John Poyer, the Parliamentarian Governor of Pembroke Castle. He was joined by Major-General Rowland Laugharne, his district commander, and Colonel Rice Powell. After the failure of his pre-emptive strike against the small Parliamentarian army of Colonel Thomas Horton at the Battle of St. Fagans, Laugharne retreated with what was left of his army to join Colonel Poyer at Pembroke.

== Prelude ==
Colonel Horton marched his 3,000 well disciplined troops, about half of which were dragoons, west to Tenby and laid siege to Tenby Castle which was held by about 500 Royalists under the command of Colonel Rice Powell. Oliver Cromwell with another Parliamentarian army consisting of three regiments of foot and two of horse had reached Gloucester on the day that the Royalist army was routed at the Battle of St. Fagans and proceeded to cross the south Welsh border shortly afterwards. He left Colonel Isaac Ewer in command of a small force to besiege the Royalist garrison of Chepstow Castle which was under the command of Sir Nicholas Kemeys and pressed on to join Horton at Tenby arriving on 15 May. Leaving Horton with enough men to deal with Powell, Cromwell marched the rest of the army to lay siege to Pembroke.

Kemeys was killed when Chepstow Castle was stormed on 25 May, and Powell was taken prisoner when he surrendered Tenby Castle to Horton on 31 May, but Pembroke Castle was a very strong medieval fortress which could not be taken as quickly. It stood on a rocky promontory surrounded on three sides by the sea, and on the landward side its defences consisted of a deep ditch and walls up to 20 feet (6.1 m) thick.

== Siege ==
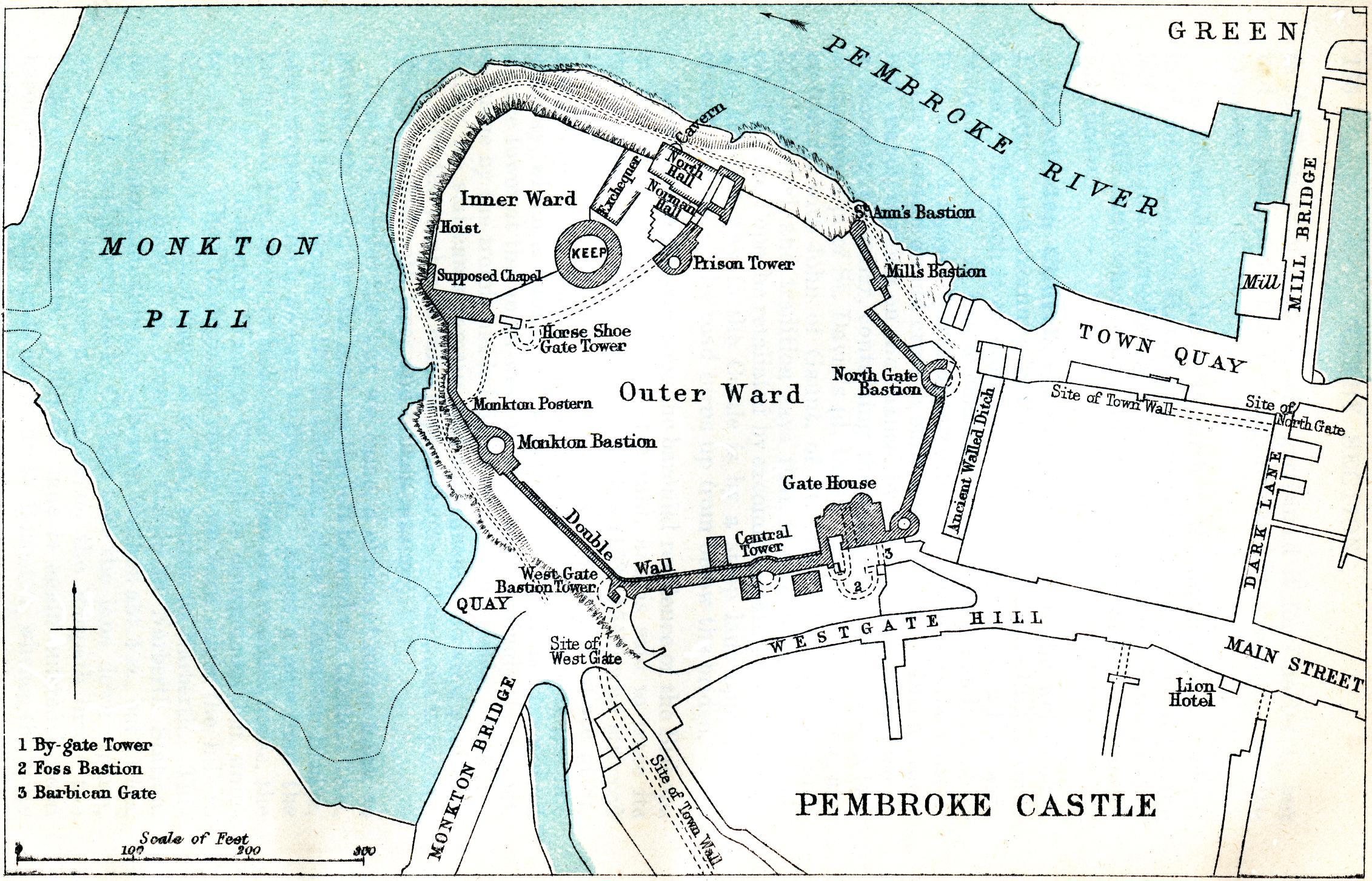
Plan of the defences of Pembroke Castle

Ships carrying siege artillery to Cromwell were forced back up the Bristol Channel to Gloucester by storms, so Cromwell tried a frontal assault. It failed because the ladders used to escalade the walls were too short. The defenders managed to surprise the besiegers in a sudden sortie, killing thirty of the besiegers and damaging the circumvallation. The siege guns arrived in mid-June but over the next month they made little impact on the thick curtain walls.

Eventually, the siege ended when Cromwell's forces discovered the conduit pipe which delivered water to the castle, and cut off the defenders' water supply. Poyer and Laugharne were forced to surrender on 11 July.

Cromwell then ordered the castle slighted so that it could never again be used as a military fortress. Laugharne, Poyer and Powell were taken to London, tried and sentenced to death, but Poyer alone was executed on 25 April 1649, being the victim selected by lot.
