= Thomas Horton (soldier) =

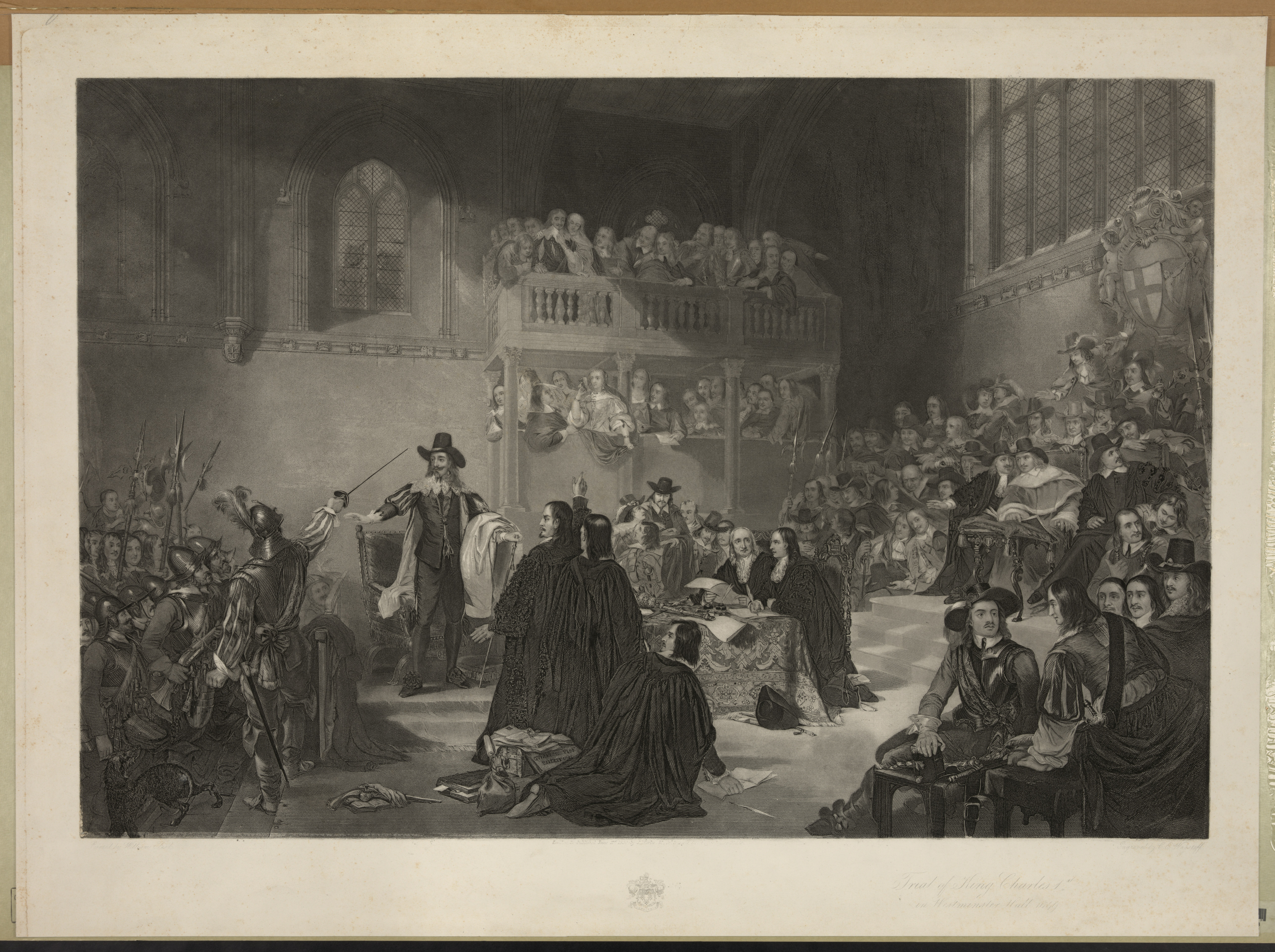
- Trial of Charles I, January 1649; Horton was one of the judges
- Born: January 1603; Gumley, Leicestershire, England
- Died: 15 October 1649 (aged 45–46); Wexford, Ireland
- Military career
- Allegiance: England
- Service years: 1642–1649
- Rank: Colonel
- Units: Colonel Thomas Horton's Regiment of Horse
- Commands: Commissioner for South Wales 1649
- Conflicts: Wars of the Three Kingdoms; Edgehill; Lansdowne; Roundway Down; Cheriton; Second Newbury; Langport; Torrington; Siege of Oxford; St Fagans; Pembroke; Sack of Wexford

Colonel Thomas Horton, January 1603 to October 1649, was a member of the minor gentry from Leicestershire who served in the Parliamentarian army during the Wars of the Three Kingdoms. Like many other of those who approved the Execution of Charles I in January 1649, Horton was a religious Independent. His family was closely connected to Sir Arthur Haselrig, one of the Five Members whose attempted arrest by Charles I in January 1642 was a major step on the road to the First English Civil War.

During the 1648 Second English Civil War, Horton played a significant role in ending the revolt in South Wales, and was rewarded with grants of land in Pembrokeshire. In August 1649, his regiment was selected for service in Ireland; he died of disease at Wexford in October, and has no known grave.

== Early life ==
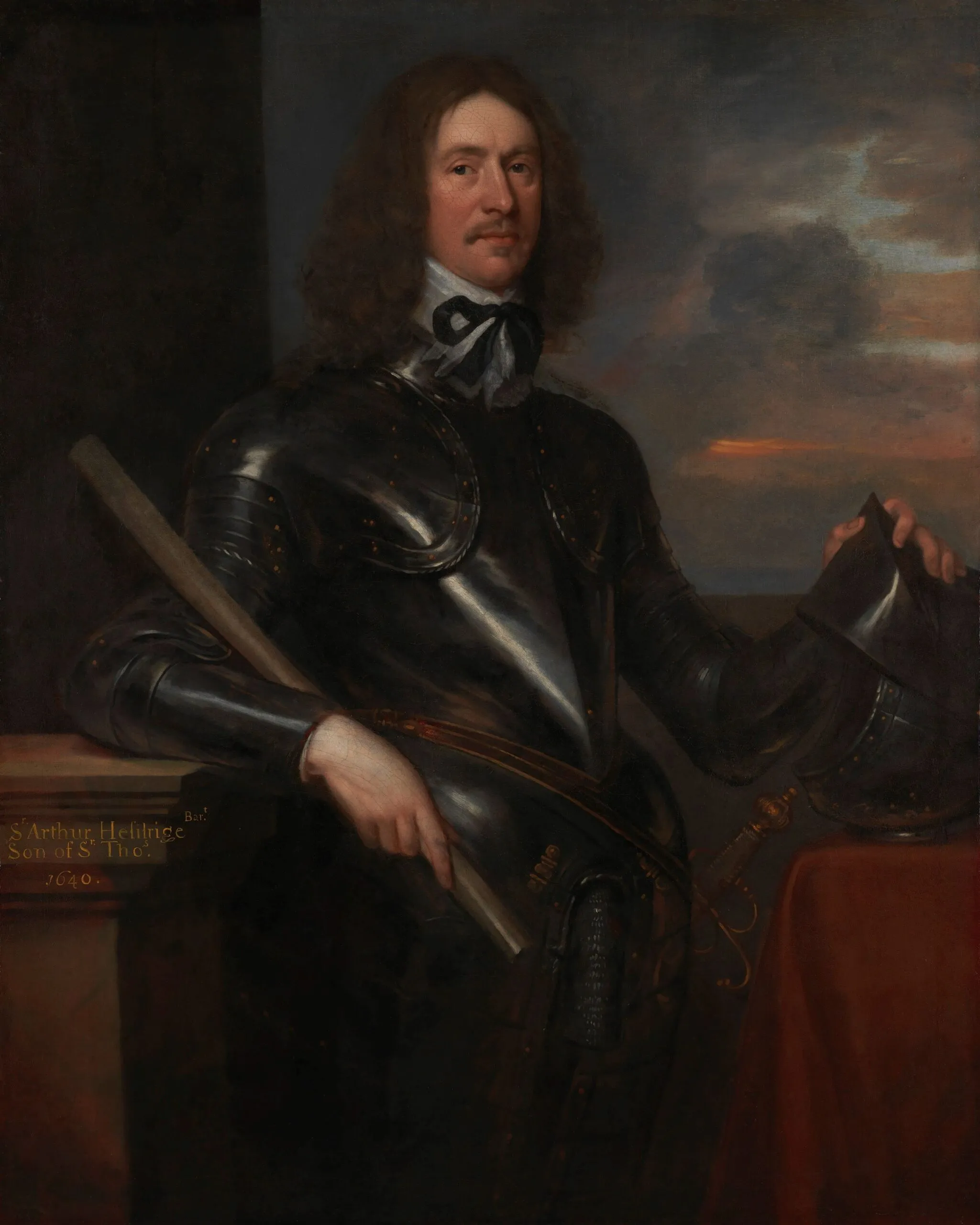
Horton's patron, Arthur Haselrig

Thomas Horton was born in Gumley, Leicestershire, second son of William Horton (1576-1638) and Isabell Freeman (died after 1649). In 1608, William purchased lands in Gumley, and thus ranked as a member of the minor gentry. Thomas was one of eight surviving children, including his elder brother John (died before 1664), James, Andrew (died after 1662), Robert (died before 1649), William (1613-after 1651), Elizabeth and Mary. Based on legal documents, with the exception of Robert, all were still alive in 1649, but there are few other details available.

In 1645, he married the daughter of John and Margaret St Loe; she presumably died soon after, as unlike her parents, she is not mentioned in his will, who are named as guardians of his son Thomas. It is suggested this is the Thomas Horton who emigrated to Milton, Massachusetts, and died in Rehoboth, Massachusetts in 1710.

== Career ==
Little is known of Horton's career prior to 1642, except for the fact he was connected to the local magnate, Sir Arthur Haselrig. It is often suggested he served him as a falconer, but documents relating to property transactions confirm his status as a minor landowner. Along with Oliver Cromwell, John Pym, and other prominent Puritans, Haselrig was associated with the Saybrook Colony, established in what is now Connecticut. Based on Thomas' 1649 will, it appears Horton advanced his youngest brother William £50 to emigrate there in 1635.

=== First English Civil War ===
One of the Five Members whose attempted arrest in January 1642 led to the First English Civil War, Haselrig raised a regiment when war began in August. Known as the 'London Lobsters', due to their distinctive armour, Horton was commissioned into this regiment as a cornet, and fought at Edgehill in October 1642. Promoted captain-lieutenant in 1643, he served in William Waller's army throughout 1643 and 1644, including the major battles of Lansdowne, Roundway Down, Cheriton, and Second Newbury.

When the New Model Army was formed in 1645, Haselrig's unit became Colonel John Butler's Regiment of Horse, with Horton as his deputy. He was badly wounded at the Battle of Naseby in June, but returned to serve in the 1645-1646 Western Campaign, including the battles of Langport and Torrington. The war ended in June 1646, with the surrender of Oxford.

=== Second English Civil War ===
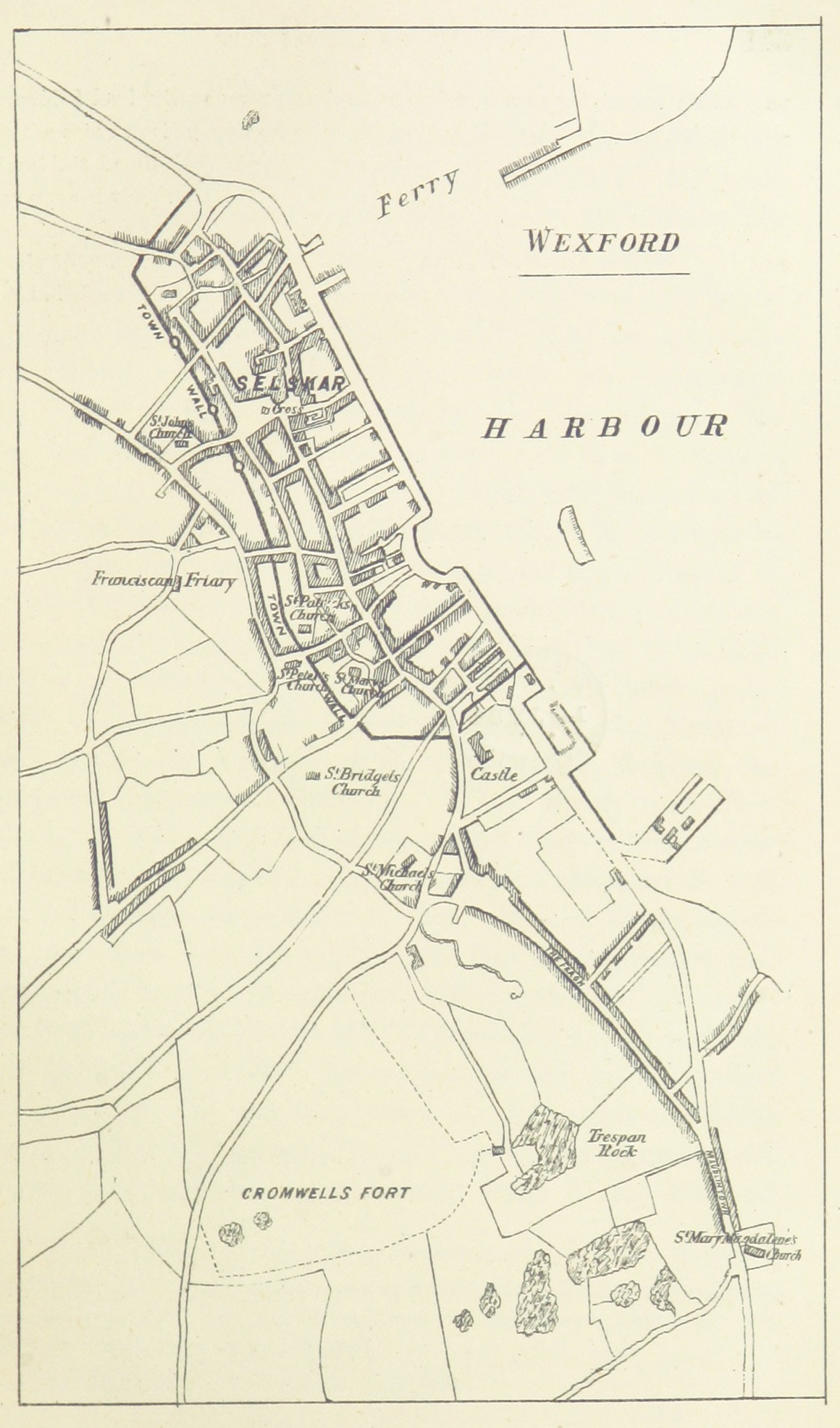
Map of 17th-century Wexford in southern Ireland, showing Cromwell's camp to the southwest; Horton died here on or around 15 October 1649

Arguments over the settlement with Charles led to internal conflict between Parliamentarian moderates, mostly socially conservative Presbyterians, and radicals, many of whom were religious Independents. This included Baptists, a sect that was particularly prominent in the New Model; both Horton and his close friend, Colonel John Phillips, were members of a Baptist congregation established in Cardiff in 1649.

The economic cost of the war, a poor 1646 harvest, and recurrence of the plague meant Parliament could not meet all of its obligations. One reason the New Model favoured the radicals was because they supported full payment of their wage arrears, which by March 1647 had reached the then enormous sum of £3 million. Horton signed his regiment's 'Petition of Grievances' in May, and after Butler resigned in June, replaced him as Colonel.

The relationship between Parliament and the Army Council continued to deteriorate, leading to the eviction of the Eleven Members in July, and the occupation of London by the New Model. Another area of concern was Wales, then held by the Western Association army, under John Poyer and Rowland Laugharne, who supported the Parliamentarian moderates. By early 1647, there were considerable doubts over their reliability.

From 1642 to 1646, most of the area had been Royalist, while Harlech Castle only surrendered in March 1647. Concerns over its security increased when secret messages between Charles and the Irish Confederacy were intercepted, since Cardiff and Milford Haven could be used to transfer troops from Confederacy ports like Wexford. At the end of July 1647, Horton and a small New Model detachment was sent to South Wales, to monitor the situation.

By March 1648, Poyer's troops had not been paid for eighteen months, and he refused to hand over Pembroke Castle until their arrears had been settled. As Horton reported to London, the local populace were also furious at having to pay taxes to support an unwanted army in their area. What began as a wage dispute led to open revolt in April, when Poyer, Laugharne and Rice Powell declared their support for restoring Charles, beginning the Second English Civil War. They assembled an army of around 8,000, hoping to destroy Horton's smaller force of 3,000 before he could be reinforced by Cromwell. In contrast to Horton's experienced veterans, most of the Royalist troops were untrained and poorly armed; he won an easy victory at St Fagans on 8 May.

Shortly after this victory, Cromwell arrived in Wales with another 6,500 men, and besieged Pembroke Castle; after capturing Tenby, Horton joined him there at the end of May. The siege was delayed by a month while they waited for the artillery train to arrive; once it did, Poyer surrendered soon after, on 11 July.

=== War in Ireland ===
In 1645, Laugharne had been rewarded for his service with lands confiscated from a Welsh Royalist, John Barlow of Slebech; these were now given to Horton and Phillips, along with several others. The two were also put in charge of collecting a fine of £20,000, levied on Welsh Royalists. In January 1649, Horton was appointed to the High Court of Justice for the trial of Charles I, and signed the warrant for his execution.

Shortly after this, he was appointed Commissioner for South Wales, but in July, his regiment was one of those chosen to fight in Ireland. He landed in Dublin in September, and took part in the siege of Wexford, from 2 to 11 October. In a letter dated 25 October, Cromwell wrote Horton 'is lately dead of the country-disease', usually thought to refer to dysentery, a common disease caused by poor hygiene. His grave has since been lost.

In 1654, Parliament approved a payment to his executors of £1,454 in back pay; as a regicide, his heirs were deprived of their estate at the 1660 Restoration, although this could not have been substantial, while it seems likely his son had already emigrated.

== Sources ==
- Bennett, Martyn (2006). Oliver Cromwell. Routledge. ISBN 978-0415319218.
- "Colonel John Butler's Regiment of Horse". BCW Project.
- Denton, Barry (2004). "Horton, Thomas". Oxford Dictionary of National Biography (online ed.). Oxford University Press. doi:10.1093/ref:odnb/13828. (Subscription, Wikipedia Library access or UK public library membership required.)
- Fenton, Richard (1811). A historical tour through Pembrokeshire. Longman Hurst.
- Lee, JM; McKinley, RA (1964). A History of the County of Leicestershire: Volume 5, Gartree Hundred. Victoria County History.
- "The Hortons of Leicestershire". Tripod.com. Note; although this is self-published research, there is very little information on Thomas Horton. Use of this source has been restricted to details of Thomas and his fathers wills.
- Reece, Henry (2013). The Army in Cromwellian England, 1649-1660. OUP. ISBN 978-0198200635.
- Roberts, Stephen (2004). "Laugharne, Rowland". Oxford Dictionary of National Biography (online ed.). Oxford University Press. doi:10.1093/ref:odnb/16122. (Subscription, Wikipedia Library access or UK public library membership required.)
- Royle, Trevor (2004). Civil War: The Wars of the Three Kingdoms 1638–1660 (2006 ed.). Abacus. ISBN 978-0-349-11564-1.
- Schroeder, John J (1957). "London and the New Model Army, 1647". The Historian. 19 (3): 245–261. doi:10.1111/j.1540-6563.1957.tb01806.x. JSTOR 24436589.
- "Sir Arthur Hesilrigge's Regiment of Horse". BCW-Project.
