= Battle of St Fagans =

Second English Civil War battle in South Wales

- Part of the Second English Civil War
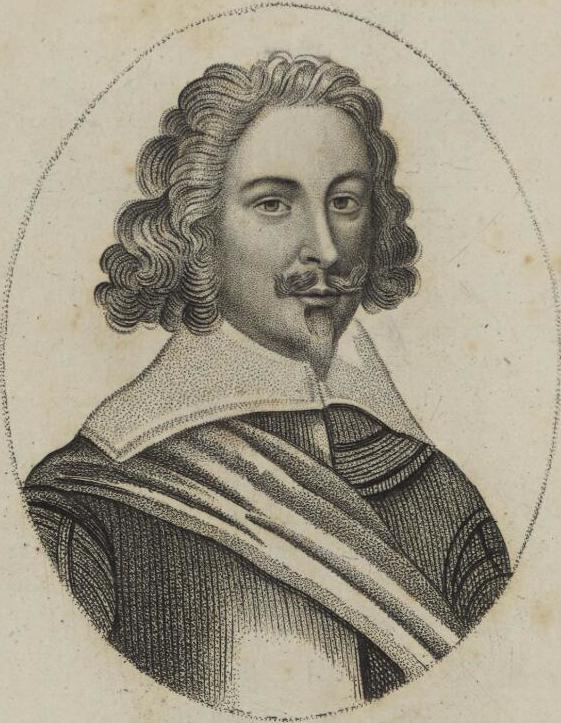
- Royalist commander and former Parliamentarian, Rowland Laugharne
Date	8 May 1648
Location	St Fagans, Wales
Result	Parliamentarian victory

Belligerents
Royalists	Parliamentarians

Commanders and leaders
Gen. Rowland Laugharne; John Poyer; Rice Powell	Thomas Horton; John Okey

Strength
7,500 infantry 500 cavalry	900 horse 800 dragoons 1,000 foot

Casualties and losses
200+ killed 3,000+ captured	Unknown

The Battle of St Fagans took place on 8 May 1648 near St Fagans in South Glamorgan, during the Second English Civil War. A detachment from the veteran Parliamentarian New Model Army defeated a Royalist force primarily composed of mutinous former Parliamentarian soldiers, and ill-equipped levies. Their defeat ended significant Royalist resistance in Wales.

== Background ==
Much of Wales had been a Royalist stronghold during the First English Civil War, and was thus considered a sensitive area by Parliament. Concern increased after messages were intercepted from the Irish Confederacy offering support to Charles I, since Royalist control of Cardiff and Milford Haven would allow them to ship Irish troops to England. In addition, the local Parliamentarian commanders, John Poyer and Rowland Laugharne, were viewed by the New Model commanders as unreliable. In July, they ordered 3,000 men under Colonel Thomas Horton to replace Laugharne, and secure these positions.

The revolt began in Pembrokeshire, an area that had been controlled by Parliament since early 1643. Like their New Model colleagues, the soldiers had not been paid for months, and feared being disbanded without their wages. In early March 1648, both Poyer, Governor of Pembroke Castle, and Rice Powell, who held Tenby Castle, refused to hand them over to officers of the New Model, and were supported by Laugharne.

Wales 1648; key locations

What began as a dispute over pay turned political when the mutineers made contact with Charles. Conversely, most former Royalists had been released after swearing not to bear arms against Parliament, and thus did not participate, one exception being Sir Nicholas Kemeys, who held Chepstow Castle for the king. By the end of April, Laugharne had assembled around 8,000 troops, and was marching on Cardiff.

Horton initially moved on Carmarthen, but then had to put down an uprising in Brecon, before occupying Cardiff and quartering his troops in and around St Fagans, west of the town. Learning that reinforcements led by Oliver Cromwell were on their way, Laugharne decided to attack Horton before they could arrive. Although Horton's 3,000 men were outnumbered, up to half of Laugharne's force were poorly trained and equipped, proving to be little match for experienced veterans.

== Battle ==
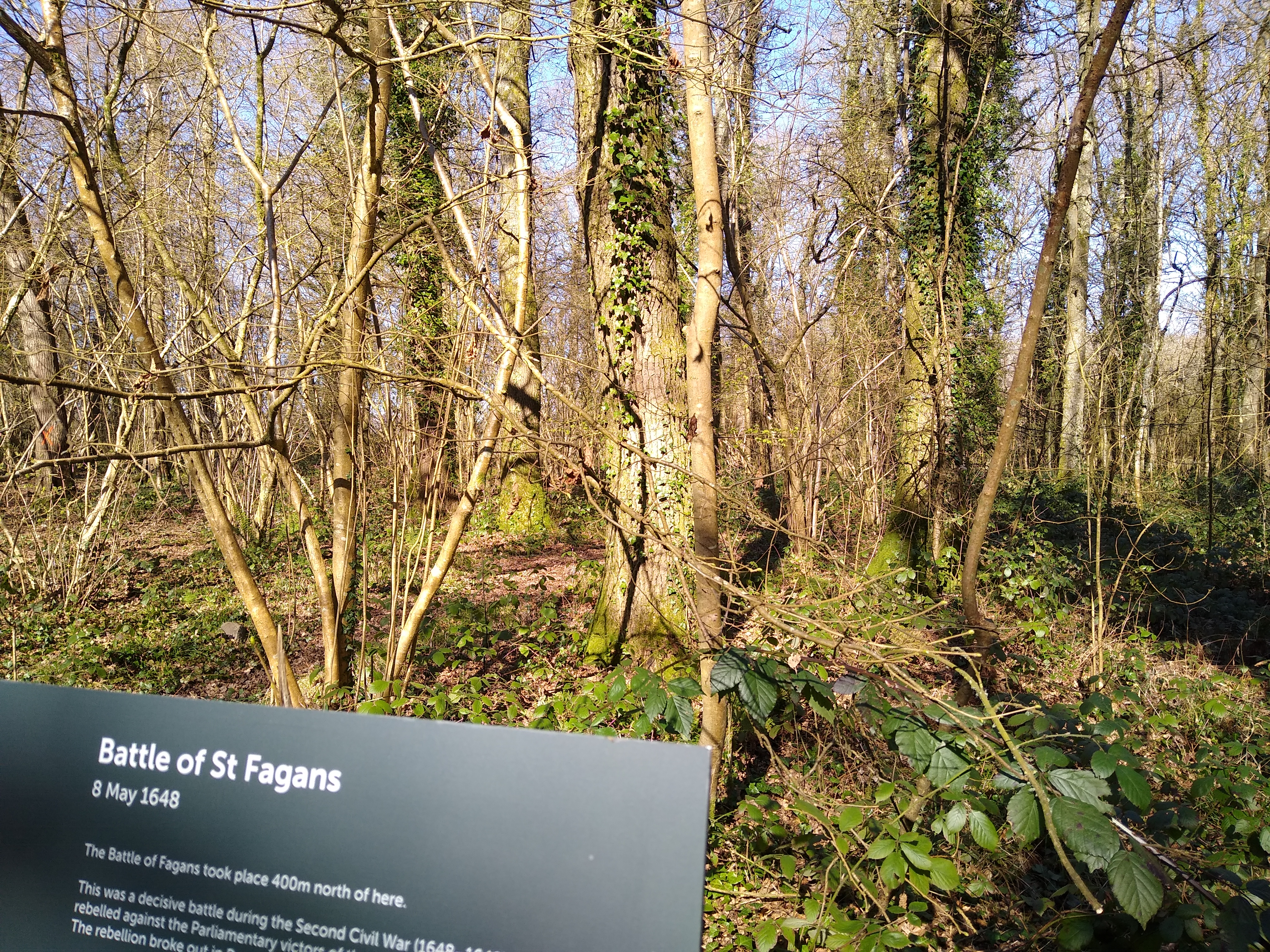
Woods near the site of the battle, photographed in 2022

Early on the morning of 8 May, Parliamentarian scouts made contact with the Royalist army about 3 kilometres (2 mi) outside St Fagans. Horton quickly deployed his troops outside the village, taking command of the centre which contained most of the infantry. The cavalry and dragoons were split between the left wing led by John Okey, and the right under Nathaniel Barton, with two small mixed units or "Forlorn hopes" directly in front.

Laugharne formed up his forces along a wooded ridge 1.2 kilometres (0.7 mi) northwest of the village. A stream known as the Nant Dowlais separated the two armies. Shortly before 8:00 am, Laugharne sent 500 infantry across the stream to attack Horton's centre, hoping to take the Parliamentarians by surprise inside the village. This advance guard was routed by a charge by some of Horton's cavalry, and the Parliamentarians were able to deploy in the open.

The battle now became general in the open area to the north west of the village. In the centre, high hedges hampered Horton's horsemen, but Okey's dragoons forced both Royalist wings back. Eventually, Parliamentarian horse under Major Bethel were able to make a charge against the Royalist left and rear. The Royalists panicked and broke. Over 200 of Laugharne's men were killed and another 3,000 were taken prisoner.

== Aftermath ==
Laugharne retreated with what was left of his army to join Poyer at Pembroke, while Horton besieged Rice Powell in Tenby Castle. Cromwell reached Gloucester on the day of the battle, then crossed into Wales shortly afterwards. Colonel Isaac Ewer and a small force were left to invest Chepstow Castle, while Cromwell joined Horton at Tenby on 15 May. Leaving Horton with enough men to deal with Powell, Cromwell marched the rest of the army to besiege Pembroke.

When these fortresses fell, Cromwell was able to march back into England to defeat an invading Scottish army at the decisive Battle of Preston. Cromwell had been considerably delayed dealing with Laugharne, but would have been even more so if Laugharne's field army had not been effectively destroyed at St Fagans.

== Sources ==
- Gaunt, Peter (1991). A Nation Under Siege: The Civil War in Wales 1642. ISBN 0-11-701222-X.
- Royle, Trevor (2004). Civil War: The Wars of the Three Kingdoms 1638–1660 (2006 ed.). Abacus. ISBN 978-0-349-11564-1.
