= St Brides =

Village and parish in Pembrokeshire, Wales

Coordinates: 51.75°N 5.19°W

St Brides: Welsh: Sain Ffraid
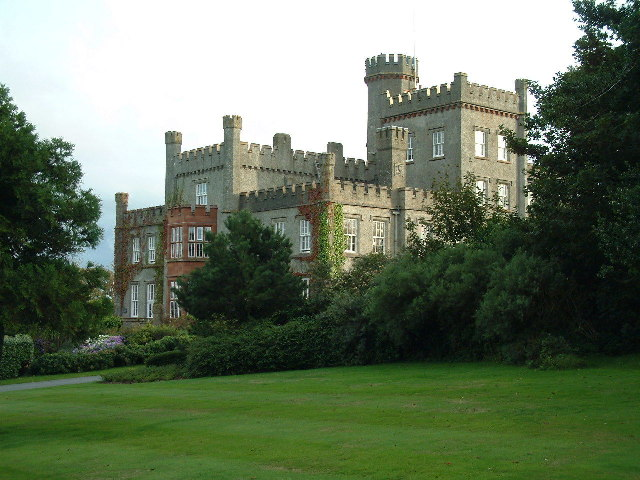
- St Brides Castle

- Location within Pembrokeshire
- OS grid reference: SM802109
- Community: Marloes and St Brides
- Principal area: Pembrokeshire
- Country: Wales
- Sovereign state: United Kingdom
- Police: Dyfed-Powys
- Fire: Mid and West Wales
- Ambulance: Welsh

St Brides (Welsh: Sain Ffraid) is a parish and small coastal village in Pembrokeshire, Wales, at the south of St Brides Bay, about 1 1/2 miles (2.4 km) north of the larger village of Marloes, with which it forms the Marloes and St Brides community.

The village is in the Pembrokeshire Coast National Park and is on the Pembrokeshire Coast Path.

== Parish church ==
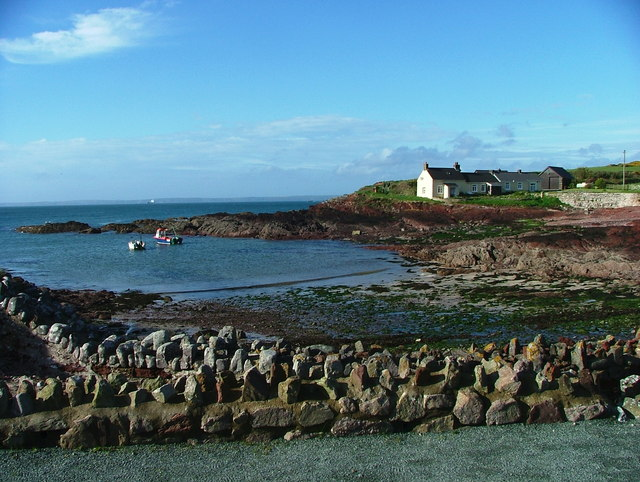
Anchorage at St Brides

The Norman parish church is dedicated to St Bridget. The earliest recorded church was 13th century, and the site may have been a religious one since the 9th century. The present Grade II listed building is 19th century, incorporating some earlier structural features.

== St Brides Castle ==
Formerly known as St Brides Hill, or just Hill, St Brides Castle is a 19th-century baronial-style mansion. It was developed for William Philipps (1810-1864) in 1833 from an earlier house which Richard Fenton referred to as an "elegant modern structure". It was acquired by the 5th Baron Kensington in 1899, added to in 1906, and in 1923 became a sanatorium, Kensington Hospital. In the 1990s the building underwent extensive renovation by current owners Holiday Property Bond and was converted into holiday accommodation. It is a grade II* listed building.

== Scouting ==
Scouting in Pembrokeshire have a campsite in the village; it is used by Scouting and Girl Guiding groups both locally and nationally.

== Notable people ==
St Brides was the birthplace of Rowland Laugharne (ca.1607 – 1675), a prominent soldier during the Wars of the Three Kingdoms, who fought for Parliament in the First English Civil War, and the Royalists in the Second English Civil War.
