= St Brides Castle =

19th century mansion in Pembrokeshire, Wales

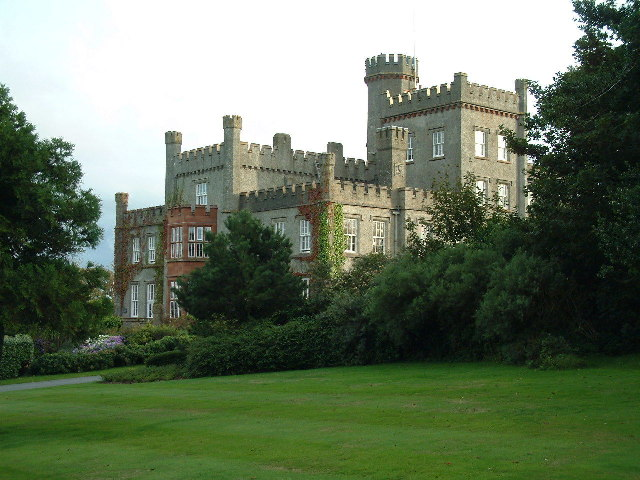
- St Brides Castle
- Interactive map of the St Brides Castle area

General information
- Location: St Brides, Wales
- Coordinates: 51.7516°N 5.1943°W
- Completed: 1833
- Owner: Holiday Property Bond

Technical details
- Floor count: 4

St Brides Castle is a 19th-century castellated baronial-style mansion in the parish of St Brides and the community of Marloes and St Brides, Pembrokeshire, southwest Wales.

== History ==
The house, formerly known as "St Brides Hill" or just "Hill", was developed for William Philipps (1810–1864) in 1833 from an 18th-century house which topographer Richard Fenton in 1811 referred to as an "elegant modern structure" which had replaced an ancient mansion to the west. In 1839 the estate extended to 348 acres (141 ha). The house was acquired by the 5th Baron Kensington in 1899 and enlarged in 1905 to 1913 for the 6th Baron Kensington, who sold it in 1920. In 1923 it became a sanatorium, Kensington Hospital. In 1992 the house was converted to holiday apartments.

== Construction ==
The present house is a two- and four-storey construction of rubble stone with sandstone additions, under slate roofs. It is a mixture of Tudor, Gothic, Edwardian and Scots Baronial styles, with many original interior features. Historian Nikolaus Pevsner suggests that the architect may have been Thomas Rowlands and describes the early-20th-century expansion of the castle for Lord Kensington as "the last major country house work in Pembrokeshire".

== Current use ==
After extensive renovation, the current owners are Holiday Property Bond. The building is Grade II* listed "as one of the best late Georgian castellated houses of the region with good interiors and high quality Edwardian additions". The grounds are designated Grade II on the Cadw/ICOMOS Register of Parks and Gardens of Special Historic Interest in Wales.

== Sources ==
- Lloyd, Thomas; Orbach, Julian; Scourfield, Robert (2004). Pembrokeshire. The Buildings Of England. New Haven, US and London: Yale University Press. ISBN 9780300101782. OCLC 176899573.
