= John Brand (antiquarian) =

English antiquarian (1744–1806)

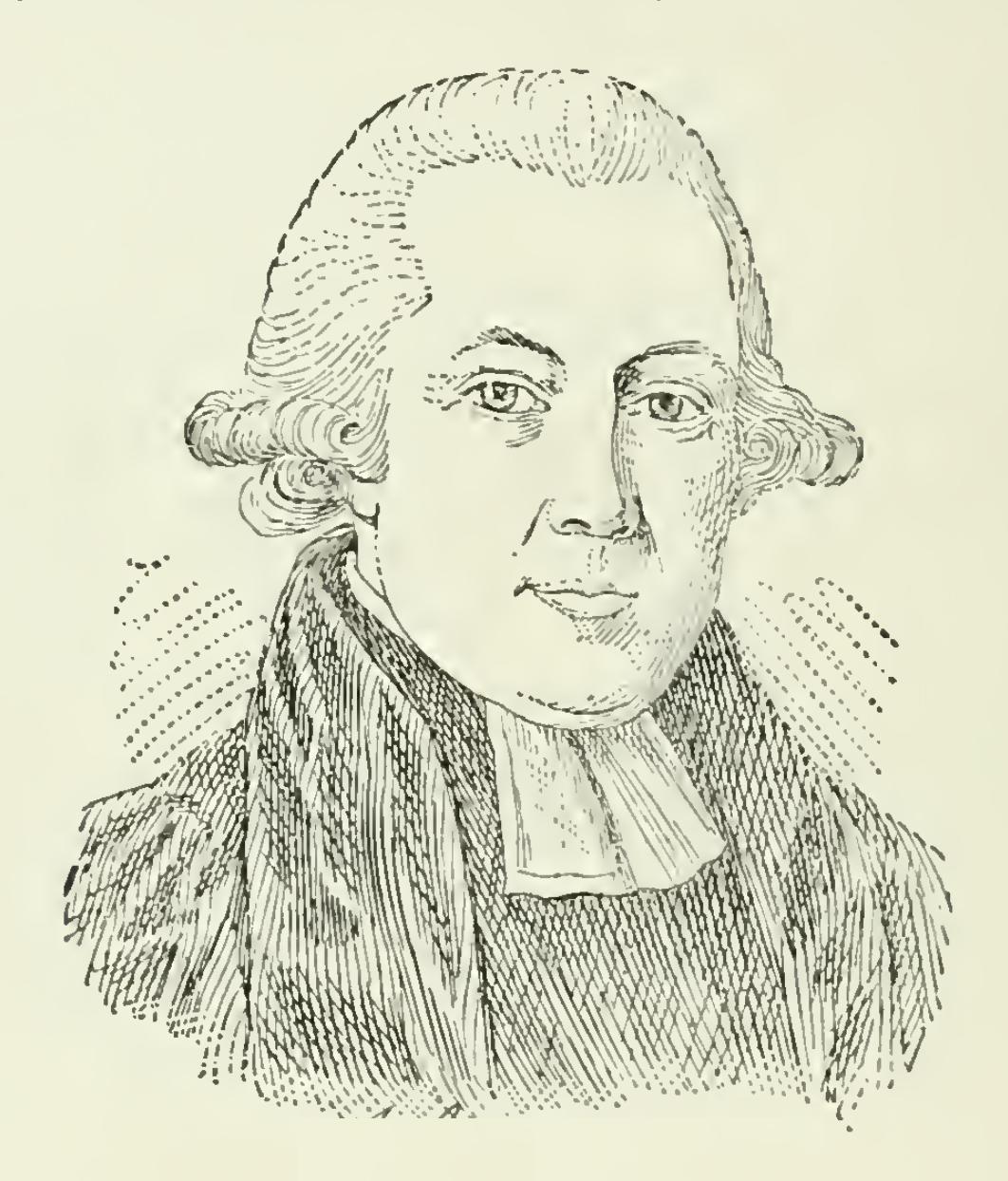
Brand

John Brand (19 August 1744 – 11 September 1806) was an English antiquarian and Church of England clergyman. He was author of Observations on Popular Antiquities: including the whole of Mr Bourne's "Antiquitates Vulgares," with addenda to every chapter of that work.

== Life ==
Born in Washington, County Durham, he was educated at the Royal Grammar School in Newcastle upon Tyne. He was initially apprenticed as a cordwainer, and later was ordained, holding in succession the curacies of Bolam, Northumberland, of St Andrew's, Newcastle, and of Cramlington. But with assistance from friends he entered Lincoln College, Oxford at the age of 28 and obtained a degree in 1775.

Brand was appointed Secretary to the Society of Antiquaries of London in 1784 and was annually re-elected until his death.

He was buried in the nearby churchyard of St Mary-at-Hill. When this churchyard was cleared, his remains were moved to West Norwood Cemetery within the enclosure that the church acquired there in 1847.

== Works ==
Brand wrote Observations on the popular antiquities of Great Britain: Including the Whole of Mr. Bourne's Antiquitates Vulgares (1777), generally referred to as Popular Antiquities. (The incorporated work was the Popular Antiquities of Henry Bourne, published 1725, with Brand's own extensive annotations). Material from it was afterwards broadly incorporated into William Hone's Every Day Book, Year Book, etc., and in Chambers' Book of Days, which had wide popular circulation. The Popular Antiquities were further revised and enlarged by Sir Henry Ellis. The expression "popular antiquities" was overtaken in the 19th century by "folklore". The book was again reworked as an alphabetical dictionary in Faiths and folklore; a dictionary of national beliefs, superstitions and popular customs, (1905) by William Carew Hazlitt.
