= Second English Civil War =

Part of Wars of the Three Kingdoms (1648)

- Part of the Wars of the Three Kingdoms
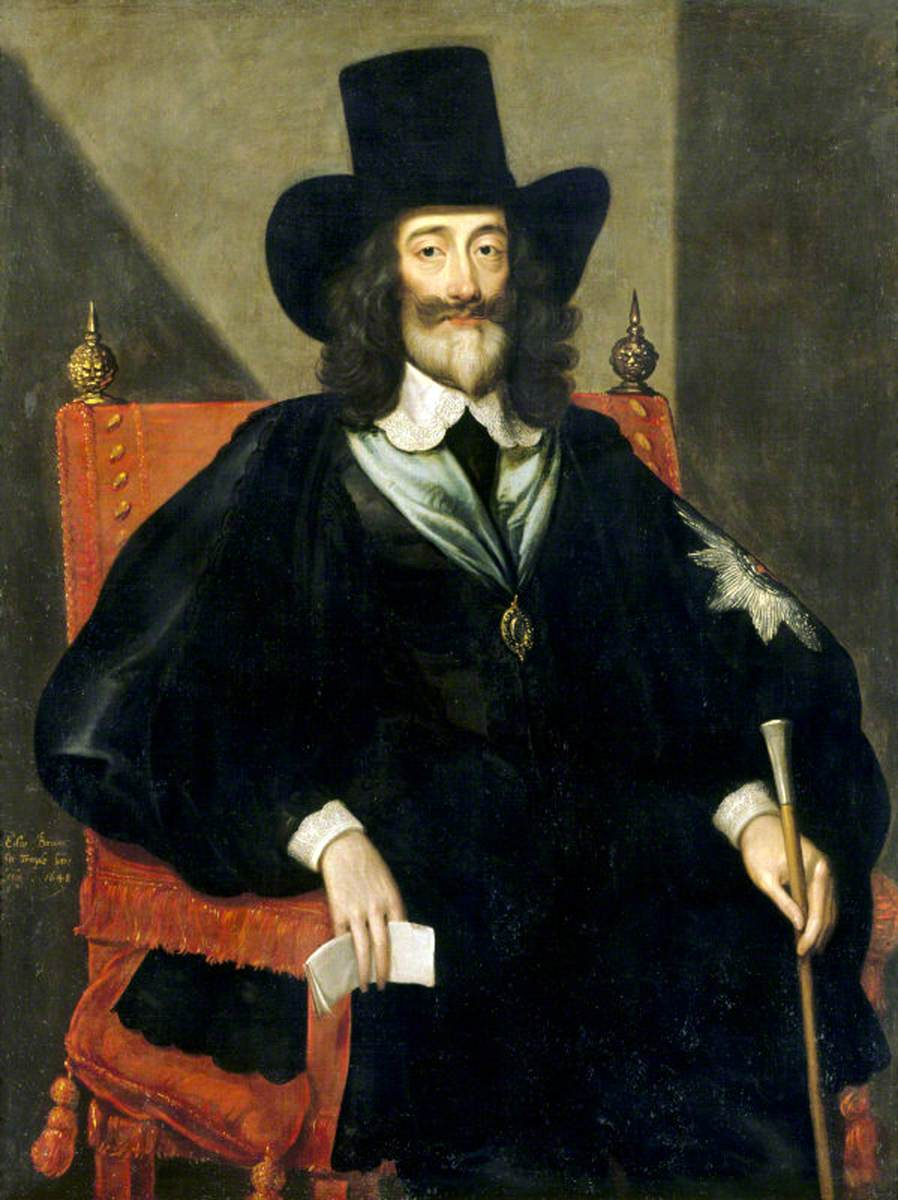
- Charles I at his trial; defeat led to his execution in January 1649
Date	February to August 1648
Location	England and Wales
Result	Parliamentarian victory
Territorial changes	Formation of the Commonwealth

Belligerents
Royalists Scottish Covenanters	(Kingdom of England) Parliamentarians

Commanders and leaders
Duke of Hamilton; Earl of Norwich; Rowland Laugharne; Charles Lucas	Oliver Cromwell; Thomas Fairfax; John Lambert

The Second English Civil War took place between February and August 1648 in England and Wales. It forms part of the series of conflicts known collectively as the 1639–1653 Wars of the Three Kingdoms, which include the 1641–1653 Irish Confederate Wars, the 1639–1640 Bishops' Wars, and the 1649–1653 Cromwellian conquest of Ireland.

Following his defeat in the First English Civil War, in May 1646 Charles I surrendered to the Scots Covenanters, rather than Parliament. By doing so, he hoped to exploit divisions between English and Scots Presbyterians, and English Independents. At this stage, all parties expected Charles to continue as king which, combined with their internal divisions, allowed him to refuse significant concessions. When the Presbyterian majority in Parliament failed to disband the New Model Army in late 1647, many joined with the Scottish Engagers in an agreement to restore Charles to the English throne.

The subsequent Scottish invasion was supported by Royalist risings in South Wales, Kent, Essex and Lancashire, along with sections of the Royal Navy. However, these were poorly co-ordinated and by the end of August 1648, they had been defeated by forces under Oliver Cromwell and Thomas Fairfax. This led to the execution of Charles I in January 1649 and establishment of the Commonwealth of England, after which the Covenanters crowned his son Charles II King of Scotland, leading to the 1650 to 1652 Anglo-Scottish War.

== Background ==
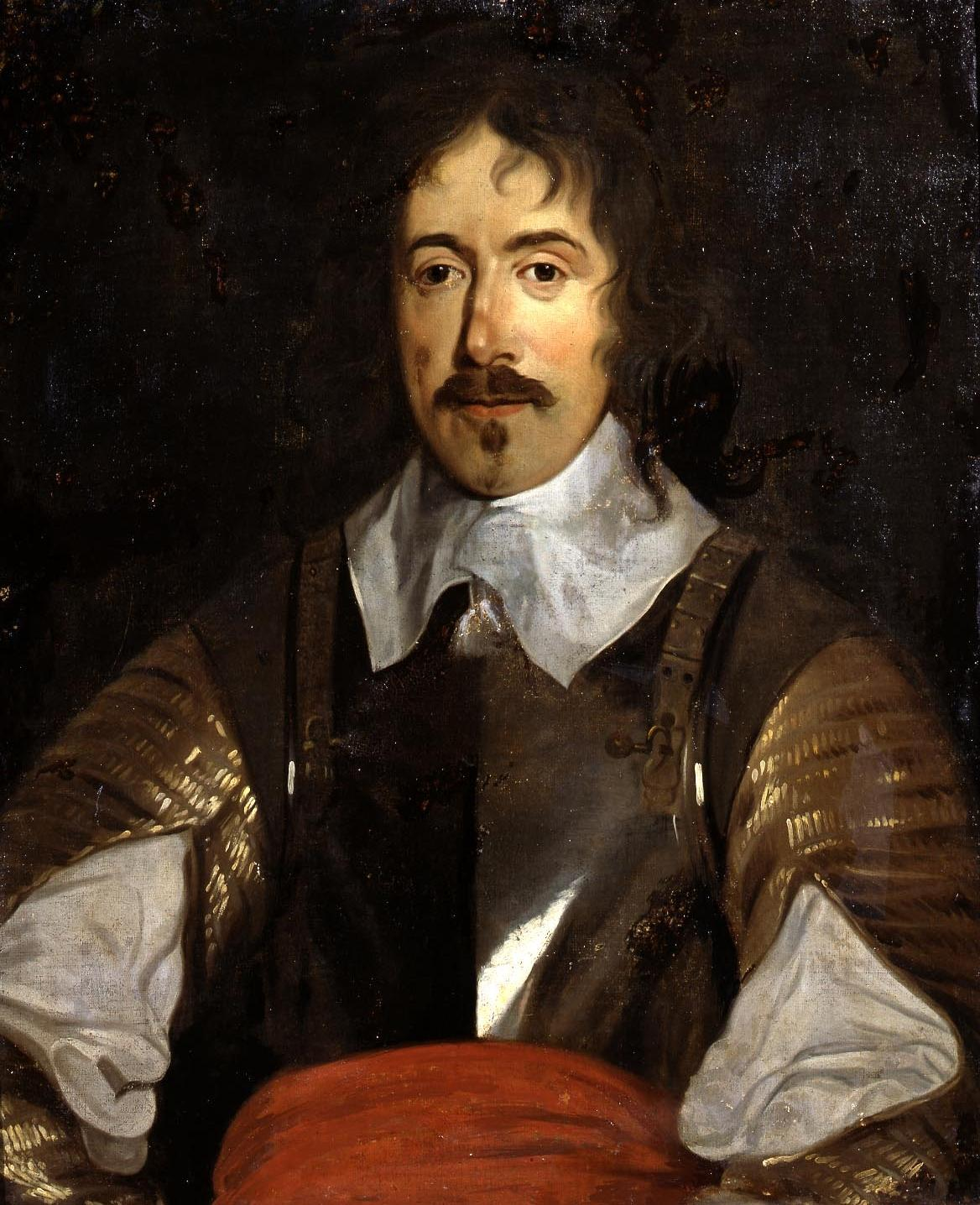
Denzil Holles, a leader of the Presbyterian faction in Parliament

Charles I ruled the three separate kingdoms of Scotland, Ireland and England in a personal union. Thus the conflicts that started in 1639 and lasted until 1653 are known as the Wars of the Three Kingdoms. The 1639 and 1640 Bishops' Wars began when Charles attempted to bring the Church of Scotland, the Kirk, into line with reforms recently enacted within the Church of England. Known as Laudianism, these changes were opposed by English Puritans and the vast majority of Scots, many of whom signed the National Covenant pledging to preserve the Kirk by force of arms. Known as Covenanters, their victory in the Bishops' Wars confirmed their control of Scotland and provided momentum for the king's opponents in England. The Covenanters passed laws that required all civil office-holders, MPs and clerics to sign the Covenant, and gave the Parliament of Scotland the right to approve all Royal councillors in Scotland.

Tensions about religion and the governance of the nation were also rising in England. All parties agreed a 'well-ordered' monarchy was divinely mandated, but they disagreed on what 'well-ordered' meant, particularly with regards to the balance of power between king and parliament, and on the question of where ultimate authority in clerical affairs lay. Royalists generally supported a Church of England governed by bishops, appointed by, and answerable to, the king; Parliamentarians tended to believe that church leaders should be appointed by their congregations. The relationship between Charles and his English Parliament eventually broke down entirely, resulting in the outbreak of the First English Civil War in 1642.

In England, Charles's supporters, the Royalists, were opposed by the combined forces of the Parliamentarians and the Scots. In 1643 the latter pair formed an alliance bound by the Solemn League and Covenant, in which the English Parliament agreed to reform the English church along similar lines to the Scottish Kirk in return for the Scots' military assistance. After four years of war the Royalists were defeated and Charles surrendered to the Scots on 5 May 1646. The Scots agreed with the English Parliament on a peace settlement which would be put before the king. Known as the Newcastle Propositions, it would have required all the king's subjects in Scotland, England and Ireland to sign the Solemn League and Covenant, brought the church in each kingdom into accordance with the Covenant and with Presbyterianism, and ceded much of Charles's secular authority as king of England to the English Parliament. The Scots spent some months trying to persuade Charles to agree to these terms, but he refused to do so. Under pressure from the English to withdraw their forces now the war was over, the Scots handed Charles over to the English Parliamentary forces in exchange for a financial settlement and left England on 3 February 1647.

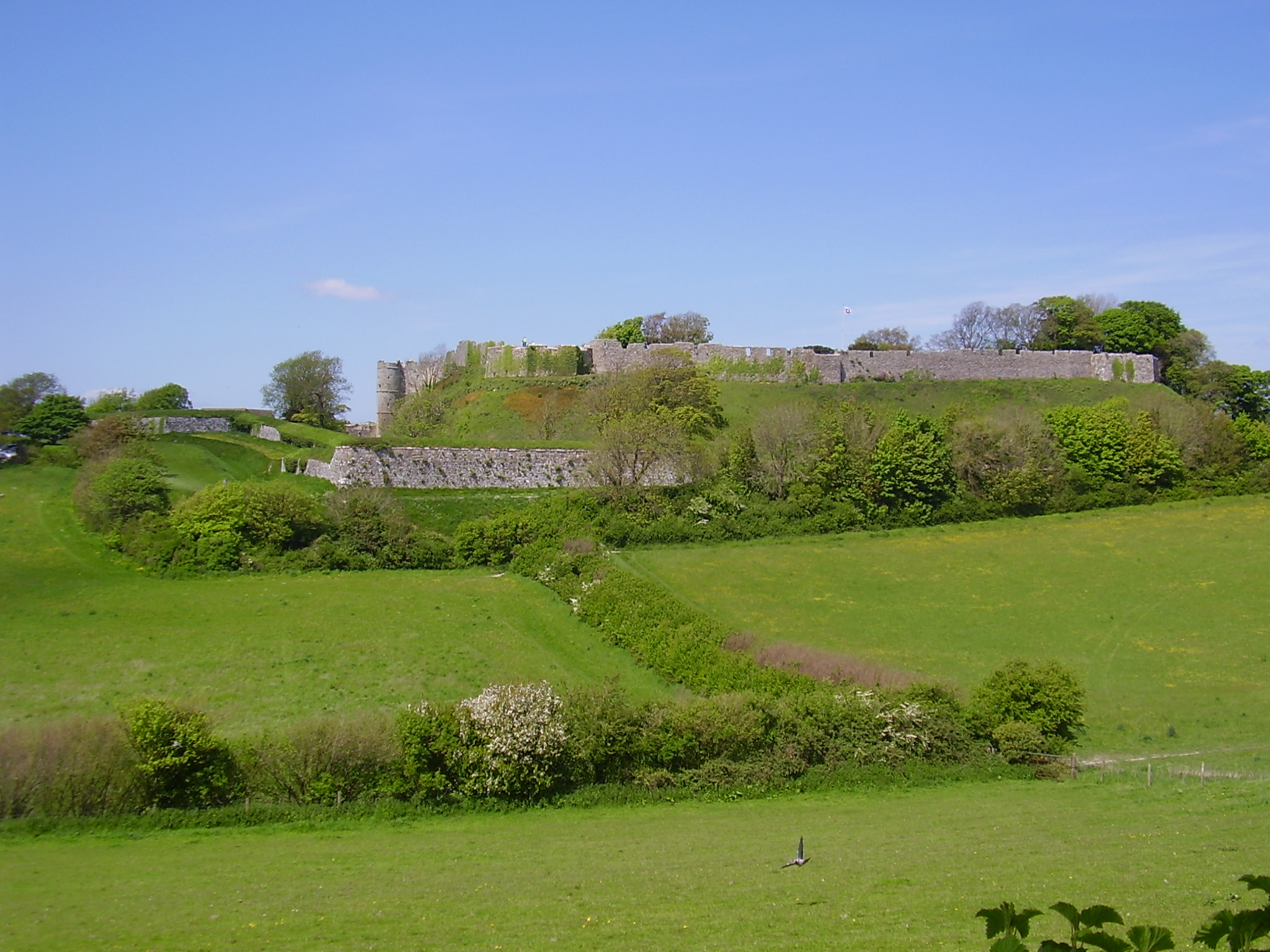
Carisbrooke Castle, on the Isle of Wight, where Charles was held in December 1648

In England, Parliament was struggling with the economic cost of the war, a poor 1646 harvest, and a recurrence of the plague. The moderate Presbyterian faction led by Denzil Holles dominated Parliament and was supported by the London Trained Bands, the Army of the Western Association, leaders like Rowland Laugharne in Wales, and elements of the English navy. By March 1647, the New Model Army was owed more than £3 million in unpaid wages; (Note: £3 million in 1647 equates to approximately £490,000,000 in 2025, according to calculations based on retail price index measure of inflation.) Parliament ordered it to Ireland, stating only those who agreed to go would be paid. When their representatives demanded full payment for all in advance, it was ordered that it be disbanded, but its leaders refused to do so.

Charles now engaged in separate negotiations with different factions. Presbyterian English Parliamentarians and the Scots wanted him to accept a modified version of the Newcastle Propositions, but in June 1647, Cornet George Joyce of the New Model Army seized Charles, and the army council pressed him to accept the Heads of Proposals, a less demanding set of terms which, crucially, did not require a Presbyterian reformation of the church. On 26 July pro-Presbyterian rioters burst into Parliament, demanding that Charles be invited to London; fearing that the king might be restored without concessions, the New Model Army took control of the city in early August, while the Army Council re-established their authority over the rank and file by suppressing the Corkbush Field mutiny. The Eleven Members of Parliament whom the army identified as opposed to its interests were removed forcibly, and on 20 August Oliver Cromwell brought a regiment of cavalry to Hyde Park, rode with an escort to Parliament and pushed through the Null and Void Ordinance, leading to the Presbyterian MPs withdrawing from Parliament. Charles eventually rejected the Heads of Proposals, and instead signed an offer known as the Engagement, which had been thrashed out with the Scottish delegation, on 26 December 1647. Charles agreed to confirm the Solemn League and Covenant by Act of Parliament in both kingdoms, and to accept Presbyterianism in England, but only for a trial period of three years, in return for the Scots' assistance in regaining his throne in England.

When the delegation returned to Edinburgh with the Engagement, the Scots were bitterly divided on whether to ratify its terms. Its supporters, who became known as the Engagers, argued that it offered the best chance the Scots would get of acceptance of the Covenant across the three kingdoms, and that rejecting it risked pushing Charles to accept the Heads of Proposals. It was opposed by those who believed that to send an army into England on behalf of the king would be to break the Solemn League and Covenant, and that it offered no guarantee of a lasting Presbyterian church in England; the Kirk went so far as to issue a declaration on 5 May 1648 condemning the Engagement as a breach of God's law. After a protracted political struggle, the Engagers gained a majority in the Scottish Parliament, and it was accepted.

== South Wales ==
Western England and South Wales; 1645

Wales was a sensitive area, since most of it had been Royalist during the war, while Harlech Castle was the last of their strongpoints to surrender in March 1647. The interception of secret messages between Charles and the Irish Confederacy made it important to secure ports like Cardiff and Milford Haven since they controlled shipping routes with Ireland. The Army Council viewed the local commanders, John Poyer and Rowland Laugharne, with suspicion, since they supported the Parliamentarian moderates. In July, Horton was sent to replace Laugharne, and secure these positions.

The revolt began in Pembrokeshire, an area controlled by Parliament since early 1643. Like their New Model colleagues, the soldiers had not been paid for months, and feared being disbanded without their wages. In early March, Poyer, Governor of Pembroke Castle, refused to relinquish command; he was soon joined by Rice Powell, who commanded Tenby Castle, then by Laugharne. What began as a dispute over pay turned political when the Welsh rebels made contact with Charles. Most Royalists had sworn not to bear arms against Parliament and did not participate, one exception being Nicholas Kemeys, who held Chepstow Castle for the king. By the end of April, Laugharne had assembled around 8,000 troops, and was marching on Cardiff, but was defeated at St Fagans on 8 May.

This ended the revolt as a serious threat, although Pembroke Castle did not surrender until 11 July, with a minor rising in North Wales suppressed at Y Dalar Hir in June and Anglesey retaken from the rebels in early October. The Welsh rising is generally not considered part of a planned, Royalist plot, but largely accidental; however, its retention was vital for future operations in Ireland.

== Revolt against Parliament in Kent ==
A precursor to Kent's Second Civil War had come on Wednesday, 22 December 1647, when Canterbury's town crier had proclaimed the county committee's order for the suppression of Christmas Day and its treatment as any other working day. However, a large crowd gathered on Christmas to demand a church service, decorate doorways with holly bushes, and keep the shops shut. This crowd – under the slogan "For God, King Charles, and Kent" – then descended into violence and riot, with a soldier being assaulted, the mayor's house attacked, and the city under the rioters' control for several weeks until forced to surrender in early January.

On 21 May 1648, Kent rose in revolt in the King's name, and a few days later a most serious blow to the Independents was struck by the defection of the Navy, from command of which they had removed Vice-Admiral William Batten, as being a Presbyterian. Though a former Lord High Admiral, the Earl of Warwick, also a Presbyterian, was brought back to the service, it was not long before the Navy made a purely Royalist declaration and placed itself under the command of the Prince of Wales. But Fairfax had a clearer view and a clearer purpose than the distracted Parliament. He moved quickly into Kent, and on the evening of 1 June, stormed Maidstone by open force, after which the local levies dispersed to their homes, and the more determined Royalists, after a futile attempt to induce the City of London to declare for them, fled into Essex.

=== The Downs ===
Before leaving for Essex, Fairfax delegated command of the Parliamentarian forces to Colonel Nathaniel Rich to deal with the remnants of the Kentish revolt in the east of the county, where the naval vessels in the Downs had gone over to the Royalists and Royalist forces had taken control of the three previously Parliamentarian "castles of the Downs" (Walmer, Deal, and Sandown) and were trying to take control of Dover Castle. Rich arrived at Dover on 5 June 1648 and prevented the attempt, before moving to the Downs. He took almost a month to retake Walmer (15 June to 12 July), before moving on to Deal and Sandown castles. Even then, due to the small size of Rich's force, he was unable to surround both Sandown and Deal at once and the two garrisons were able to send help to each other. At Deal he was also under bombardment from the Royalist warships, which had arrived on 15 July but been prevented from landing reinforcements. On the 16th, thirty Flemish ships arrived with about 1500 mercenaries and – though the ships soon left when the Royalists ran out of money to pay them – this incited sufficient Kentish fear of foreign invasion to allow Michael Livesey to raise a large enough force to come to Colonel Rich's aid.

On 28 July, the Royalist warships returned and, after three weeks of failed attempts to land a relief force at Deal, on the night of 13 August managed to land 800 soldiers and sailors under cover of darkness. This force might have been able to surprise the besieging Parliamentarian force from the rear had it not been for a Royalist deserter who alerted the besiegers in time to defeat the Royalists, with less than a hundred of them managing to get back to the ships (though 300 managed to flee to Sandown Castle). Another attempt at landing soon afterwards also failed and, when on 23 August news was fired into Deal Castle on an arrow of Cromwell's victory at Preston, most Royalist hope was lost and two days later Deal's garrison surrendered, followed by Sandown on 5 September. This finally ended the Kentish rebellion. Rich was made Captain of Deal Castle, a position he held until 1653 and in which he spent around £500 on repairs.

== Revolt elsewhere ==
In Cornwall, Northamptonshire, North Wales, and Lincolnshire the revolt collapsed as easily as that in Kent. Only in South Wales, Essex, and the north of England was there serious fighting. In the first of these districts, South Wales, Cromwell rapidly reduced all the fortresses except Pembroke. Here Laugharne, Poyer, and Powel held out with the desperate courage of deserters.

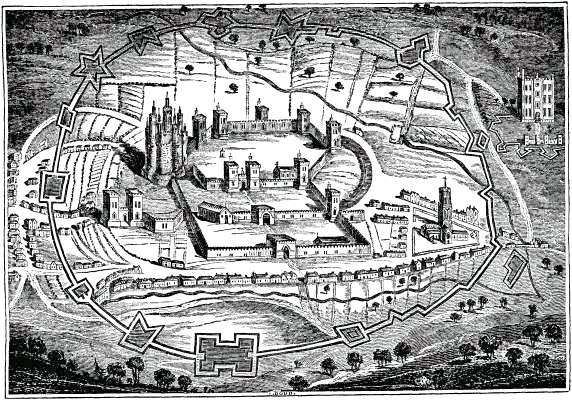
Pontefract Castle in 1648, with civil war fortifications surrounding the old medieval ones.

In the north, Pontefract Castle was surprised by the Royalists, and shortly afterwards Scarborough Castle declared for the King as well. Fairfax, after his success at Maidstone and the pacification of Kent, turned northward to reduce Essex, where, under their ardent, experienced, and popular leader Charles Lucas, the Royalists were in arms in great numbers. Fairfax soon drove Lucas into Colchester, but the first attack on the town was repulsed and he had to settle down to a long and wearisome siege.

A Surrey rising is remembered for the death of the young and gallant Lord Francis Villiers, younger brother of George Villiers, 2nd Duke of Buckingham, in a skirmish at Kingston (7 July 1648). The rising collapsed almost as soon as it had gathered force, and its leaders, the Duke of Buckingham and Henry Rich, the Earl of Holland, escaped, after another attempt to induce London to declare for them, to St Albans and St Neots, where Holland was taken prisoner. Buckingham escaped overseas.

== Lambert in the north ==
Major-General John Lambert, a brilliant young Parliamentarian commander of twenty-nine, was more than equal to the situation. He left the sieges of Pontefract Castle and Scarborough Castle to Colonel Edward Rossiter, and hurried into Cumberland to deal with the English Royalists under Marmaduke Langdale. With his cavalry, Lambert got into touch with the enemy about Carlisle and slowly fell back to Bowes and Barnard Castle. Lambert fought small rearguard actions to annoy the enemy and gain time. Langdale did not follow him into the mountains. Instead, he occupied himself in gathering recruits, supplies of material, and food for the advancing Scots.

Lambert, reinforced from the Midlands, reappeared early in June and drove Langdale back to Carlisle with his work half finished. About the same time, the local cavalry of Durham and Northumberland were put into the field for the Parliamentarians by Arthur Hesilrige, governor of Newcastle. On 30 June, under the direct command of Colonel Robert Lilburne, these mounted forces won a considerable success at the River Coquet.

This reverse, coupled with the existence of Langdale's Royalist force on the Cumberland side, practically compelled Hamilton to choose the west coast route for his advance. His Scottish Engager army began slowly to move down the long couloir between the mountains and the sea. The Campaign of Preston which followed is one of the most brilliant in English history.

== Campaign of Preston ==
On 8 July 1648, when the Scottish Engager army crossed the Anglo–Scottish border in support of the English Royalists, the military situation was well defined. For the Parliamentarians, Cromwell besieged Pembroke in West Wales, Fairfax besieged Colchester in Essex, and Colonel Rossiter besieged Pontefract and Scarborough in the north. On 11 July, Pembroke fell and Colchester followed on 28 August. Elsewhere the rebellion, which had been put down by rapidity of action rather than sheer weight of numbers, smouldered, and Charles, the Prince of Wales, with the fleet cruised along the Essex coast. Cromwell and Lambert, however, understood each other perfectly, while the Scottish commanders quarrelled with each other and with Langdale.

As the English uprisings were close to collapse, Royalist hopes centred on the Engager Scottish army. It was not the same veteran army of the Earl of Leven, which had long been disbanded. For the most part it consisted of raw levies. The Kirk party had refused to sanction the Engagement (an agreement between Charles I and the Scots Parliament for the Scots to intervene in England on behalf of Charles), causing David Leslie and thousands of experienced officers and men to decline to serve. The leadership of the Duke of Hamilton proved to be poor and his army was so ill provided for that as soon as England was invaded it began to plunder the countryside for sustenance.

On 8 July the Scots, with Langdale leading an advance guard, were near Carlisle, and reinforcements from Ulster were expected daily. Lambert's cavalry were at Penrith, Hexham and Newcastle, too weak to fight and having only skilful leading and rapidity of movement to enable them to gain time. Appleby Castle surrendered to the Scots on 31 July, whereat Lambert, who was still hanging on to the flank of the Scottish advance, fell back from Barnard Castle to Richmond so as to close Wensleydale against any attempt of the invaders to march on Pontefract. All the restless energy of Langdale's cavalry were unable to dislodge Lambert from the passes or to find out what was behind that impenetrable cavalry screen. The crisis was now at hand. Cromwell had received the surrender of Pembroke Castle on 11 July, and had marched off, with his men unpaid, ragged and shoeless, at full speed through the Midlands. Rains and storms delayed his march, but he knew that the Duke of Hamilton in the broken ground of Westmorland was still worse off. Shoes from Northampton and stockings from Coventry met him at Nottingham, and gathering up the local levies as he went, he made for Doncaster, where he arrived on 8 August, having gained six days in advance of the time he had allowed himself for the march. He then called up artillery from Hull, exchanged his local levies for the regulars who were besieging Pontefract, and set off to meet Lambert. On 12 August he was at Wetherby, Lambert at Otley, Langdale at Skipton and Gargrave, Hamilton at Lancaster, and George Monro with the Scots from Ulster and the Carlisle Royalists (organised as a separate command owing to friction between Monro and the generals of the main army) at Hornby. On 13 August, while Cromwell was marching to join Lambert at Otley, the Scottish leaders were still disputing whether they should make for Pontefract or continue through Lancashire so as to join Lord Byron and the Cheshire Royalists.

=== Battle of Preston ===
On 14 August 1648 Cromwell and Lambert were at Skipton, on 15 August at Gisburn, and on 16 August they marched down the valley of the Ribble towards Preston with full knowledge of the enemy's dispositions and full determination to attack him. They had with them troops from both the Army and the militias of Yorkshire, Durham, Northumberland and Lancashire, and were heavily outnumbered, having only 8,600 men against perhaps 20,000 of Hamilton's command. But the latter were scattered for convenience of supply along the road from Lancaster, through Preston, towards Wigan, Langdale's corps having thus become the left flank guard instead of the advanced guard.

Langdale called in his advanced parties, perhaps with a view to resuming the duties of advanced guard, on the night of 13 August, and collected them near Longridge. It is not clear whether he reported Cromwell's advance, but, if he did, Hamilton ignored the report, for on 17 August Monro was half a day's march to the north, Langdale east of Preston, and the main army strung out on the Wigan road, Major-General William Baillie with a body of foot, the rear of the column, being still in Preston. Hamilton, yielding to the importunity of his lieutenant-general, James Livingston, 1st Earl of Callendar, sent Baillie across the Ribble to follow the main body just as Langdale, with 3,000 infantry and 500 cavalry, met the first shock of Cromwell's attack on Preston Moor. Hamilton, like Charles at Edgehill, passively shared in, without directing, the Battle of Preston, and, though Langdale's men fought fiercely, they were driven to the Ribble after four hours' struggle.

Baillie attempted to cover the Ribble and Darwen bridges on the Wigan road, but Cromwell had forced his way across both before nightfall. Pursuit was at once undertaken, and not relaxed until Hamilton had been driven through Wigan and Winwick to Uttoxeter and Ashbourne. There, pressed furiously in rear by Cromwell's cavalry and held up in front by the militia of the Midlands, the remnant of the Scottish army laid down its arms on 25 August. Various attempts were made to raise the Royalist standard in Wales and elsewhere, but Preston was the death-blow. On 28 August, starving and hopeless of relief, the Colchester Royalists surrendered to Lord Fairfax.

== Execution of Charles I ==
The victors in the Second Civil War were not merciful to those who had brought war into the land again. On the evening of the surrender of Colchester, Charles Lucas and George Lisle were shot. Laugharne, Poyer and Powel were sentenced to death, but Poyer alone was executed on 25 April 1649, being the victim selected by lot. Of five prominent Royalist peers who had fallen into the hands of Parliament, three, the Duke of Hamilton, the Earl of Holland, and Lord Capel, one of the Colchester prisoners, were beheaded at Westminster on 9 March. Above all, after long hesitations, even after renewal of negotiations, the Army and the Independents conducted "Pride's Purge" of the House removing their ill-wishers, and created a court for the trial and sentence of King Charles I. At the end of the trial the 59 Commissioners (judges) found Charles I guilty of high treason, as a "tyrant, traitor, murderer and public enemy". He was beheaded on a scaffold in front of the Banqueting House of the Palace of Whitehall on 30 January 1649. After the Restoration in 1660, the regicides who were still alive and not living in exile were either executed or sentenced to life imprisonment.

== Capitulation of Pontefract Castle ==
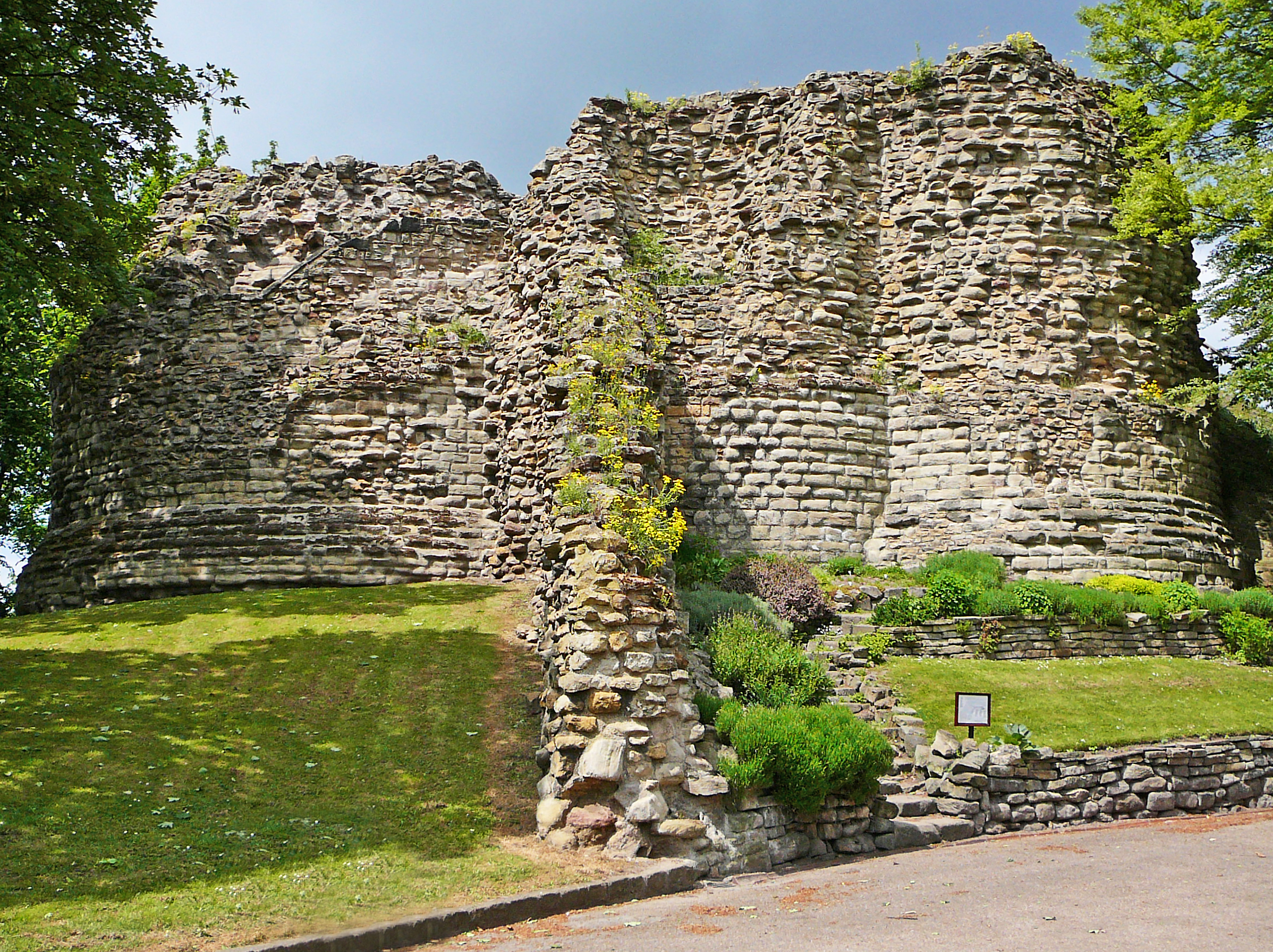
Pontefract Castle was slighted on the orders of Parliament.

Pontefract Castle was noted by Oliver Cromwell as "[...] one of the strongest inland garrisons in the kingdom". Even in ruins, the castle held out in the north for the Royalists. Upon the execution of Charles I, the garrison recognised Charles II as king and refused to surrender. On 24 March 1649, almost two months after Charles was beheaded, the garrison of the last Royalist stronghold finally capitulated. Parliament had the remains of the castle demolished the same year.

== Aftermath ==
Following Charles's execution, the Commonwealth of England was established. In Scotland, Charles II became the new king, the resulting tensions leading to the Anglo-Scottish War of 1650 to 1652.

== See also ==
- Chronology of the Wars of the Three Kingdoms

== Notes, citations and sources ==
=== Sources ===
- Brand, John (1905), "Christmas Day", in Hazlitt, W. Carew (ed.), Faith and Folklore: A Dictionary of National Beliefs, Superstitions and Popular Customs, Past and Current, With Their Classical and Foreign Analogues, Described and Illustrated, vol. 1, pp. 117–18
- DL staff (2012), About the Duchy >Historic Properties >Yorkshire, Duchy of Lancaster
- Durston, Chris (December 1985), "Lords of misrule: The Puritan war on Christmas 1642–60", History Today
- Furgol, Edward (2002). "The Civil Wars in Scotland". In John Kenyon & Jane Ohlmeyer (eds.). The Civil Wars: A Military History of England, Scotland and Ireland 1638–1660. Oxford: Oxford University Press. pp. 41–72. ISBN 978-0-19-280278-1.
- Gentles, Ian (2002). "The Civil Wars in England". In John Kenyon & Jane Ohlmeyer (eds.). The Civil Wars: A Military History of England, Scotland and Ireland 1638–1660. Oxford: Oxford University Press. pp. 103–154. ISBN 978-0-19-280278-1.
- Grayling, AC (2017). Democracy and its crisis. Oneworld Publications. ISBN 978-1-78607-289-4.
- Noake, Jenny (5 February 2007), Deal Castle, www.dealkent.co.uk Deal Kent Heritage Pages, archived from the original on 29 September 2007
- Kelsey, Sean (2003), "The Trial of Charles I", English Historical Review, 118 (477): 583–616, doi:10.1093/ehr/118.477.583, archived from the original on 1 December 2006
- Kenyon, John & Ohlmeyer, Jane (2002). "The Background to the Civil Wars in the Stuart Kingdoms". In John Kenyon & Jane Ohlmeyer (eds.). The Civil Wars: A Military History of England, Scotland and Ireland 1638–1660. Oxford: Oxford University Press. pp. 3–40. ISBN 978-0-19-280278-1.
- Kirby, Michael (22 January 1999), The trial of King Charles I – defining moment for our constitutional liberties, speech to the Anglo-Australasian Lawers' association
- Limbird, John (28 January 1832), "Pontefract Castle", The Mirror of Literature, Amusement, and Instruction, vol. 19, no. 531, London: John Limbird, 143, Strand, archived from the original on 17 February 2012
- Macleod, Donald (Autumn 2009). "The influence of Calvinism on politics" (PDF). Theology in Scotland. XVI (2).
- Plant, David (27 May 2009), The Preston Campaign 1648, British Civil Wars & Commonwealth, archived from the original on 21 August 2006
- Rees, John (2016). The Leveller Revolution. Verso. ISBN 978-1-78478-390-7.
- Roberts, Stephen (2004). "Laugharne, Rowland". Oxford Dictionary of National Biography (online ed.). Oxford University Press. doi:10.1093/ref:odnb/16122. (Subscription, Wikipedia Library access or UK public library membership required.)
- Royle, Trevor (2004). Civil War: The Wars of the Three Kingdoms 1638–1660 (2006 ed.). Abacus. ISBN 978-0-349-11564-1.
- Stewart, Laura A.M. (2016). Rethinking the Scottish Revolution. Oxford: Oxford University Press. ISBN 978-0-19-871844-4.
- Wakefield staff (4 January 2012) [2010], Pontefract Castle, www.wakefield.gov.uk, archived from the original on 25 September 2012
- Wakefield staff (7 December 2010), History of Pontefract Castle, www.wakefield.gov.uk, archived from the original on 29 July 2012
- Woolrych, Austin (2002). Britain in Revolution 1625–1660. Oxford: Oxford University Press. ISBN 978-0-19-820081-9.
