= Isaac Ewer =

Regicide of Charles I

Isaac Ewer (died c.1650) was an English soldier and one of the Regicides of King Charles I of England.

== Biography ==
He was likely born in Essex; in his last will and testament, he describes himself as of Hatfield Broad Oak and before the Civil War was "but a serving-man".

He joined the parliamentary army in 1642 and ultimately rose to be a colonel of foot. He besieged and took Chepstow Castle, Monmouthshire on 25 May 1648. During the Second English Civil War he was also present at the siege of Colchester during the same year, and formed one of the council of war passing summary sentence on Sir Charles Lucas and Sir George Lisle.

It was Ewer who presented to the House of Commons, on 20 November 1648, the declaration of the army in which they insisted on Charles I being speedily brought to justice. Ten days later Ewer was given the custody of the king at Hurst Castle, of which he was made governor. Ewer was chosen as one of the judges at the trial of King Charles I. He was present every day during the trial, and signed the warrant.

In April 1649 his regiment was ordered to Ireland. He took part in the storming of Drogheda, 10 September, where most of his officers were severely wounded, was at Clonmel 9 May 1650, and during June and August of the same year assisted Ireton in the reduction of Waterford. He died suddenly of the plague after the surrender of Waterford (10 August), and was buried there. As a regicide his estate was confiscated by the government after the Restoration under the provisions of the Indemnity and Oblivion Act.

== Family ==
Ewer married Joan Thurloe, sister of John Thurloe, in 1633. She died before him.
