= Rice Powell =

Rice Powell was a Welsh Colonel in the Parliamentary army during the First English Civil War. In the Second English Civil War he allied himself with the Royalist cause. He fought in South Wales and played a significant part in events between 1642 and 1649 including a senior role during the Battle of St. Fagans.

== Background ==
His background is uncertain but he is probably the son of a Lewis Powell and is from South Pembrokeshire, first coming to notice for his service in Ireland prior to the start of what was to become the First English Civil War, playing a part in quelling an insurrection in Ireland which was presumably his first taste of military life.

== English Civil War ==
In 1642 and the start of the war he returned to Pembrokeshire, apparently still owed arrears of pay for his Irish service and joined with John Poyer and Rowland Laugharne in the defence of Pembroke Castle and offensive actions throughout Pembrokeshire. He was appointed governor of Cardigan Castle by Laugharne in 1644 as soon as it was captured and successfully defended it against a Royalist attack led by Sir Charles Gerard, 1st Earl of Macclesfield.

== Rebellion ==
In 1646 he was governor of Tenby Castle and by 1648 he was deputising for Laugharne when he was called to London and held command of all the forces in West Wales at the time of the order for supernumeraries to lay down their arms. Rice Powell followed John Poyer's lead and resisted this order, making a joint declaration in favour of the Royalist cause.

Apparently the rebels has been assured of Royalist support for their stance and at Carmarthen Powell's forces met those of Colonel Fleming and Colonel Horton, who attempted to bring Powell's force to battle near Llangathen resulting in a skirmish during which Fleming in retreat was shot and Horton was forced to withdraw as far as Brecon to resupply.

Powell now led his forces to seize Swansea, then Neath before advancing into the Vale of Glamorgan with Royalists rising in support en route, with Cardiff as their aim.

Horton headed south from Brecon rapidly and caught Powell's force camped at St Fagans within view of Cardiff and drew them to battle at what became known as the Battle of St. Fagans in May 1648. Laugharne returned in time to retake command but was routed by Hortons force in a decisive victory.

Powell fled back to Pembrokeshire and Tenby castle where he was pursued and after a brief siege was persuaded to an unconditional surrender after which he was Court Martialed and sentenced to death.

In 1649 he was offered a Pardon and following the Restoration he was released. He last comes to notice in 1665 appealing to Charles II of England for payment of debts Powell accrued in the Royalist cause. There is no record of his debts being paid.
