= Tenby Castle =

Castle ruins in Pembrokeshire, Wales

Coordinates: 51°40′21″N 4°41′41″W

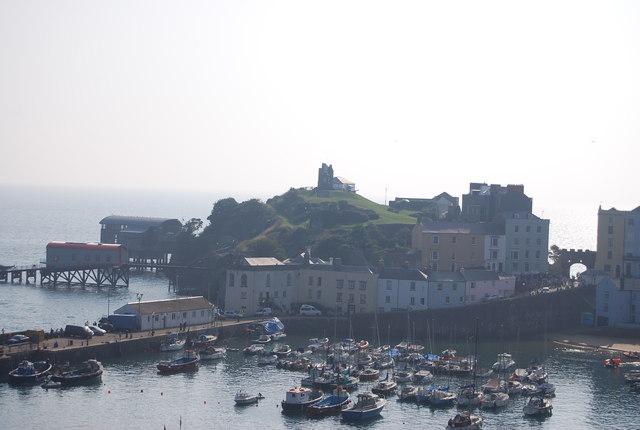
Tenby Castle

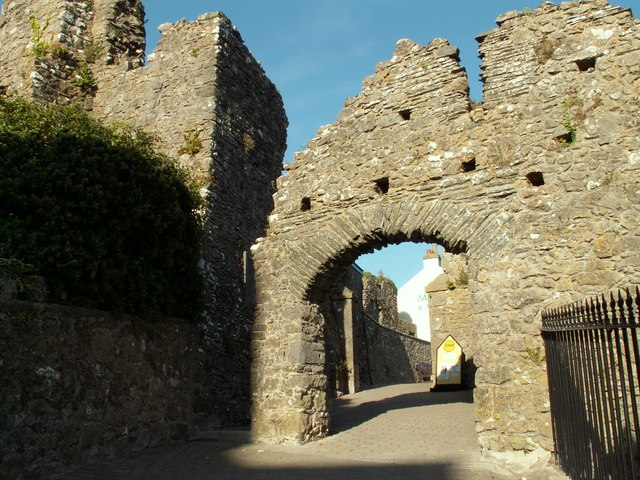
A gate leading to Tenby Castle.

Tenby Castle (Welsh: Castell Dinbych-y-pysgod) was a fortification standing on a headland separated by an isthmus from the town of Tenby, Pembrokeshire, Wales. The remaining stone structure dates from the 13th century but there are mentions of the castle from as early as 1153. It is a Grade II* listed building.

== History ==
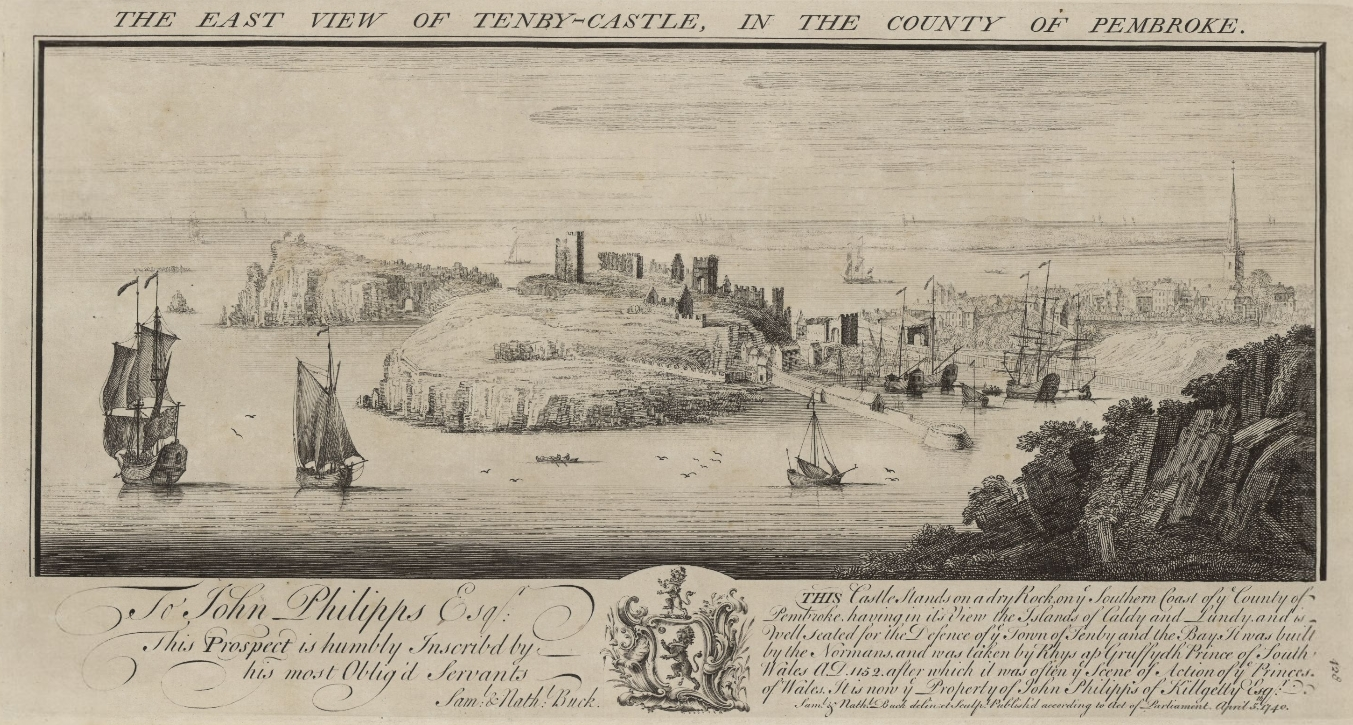
The east view of Tenby Castle - in the county of Pembroke, 1740

=== Construction ===
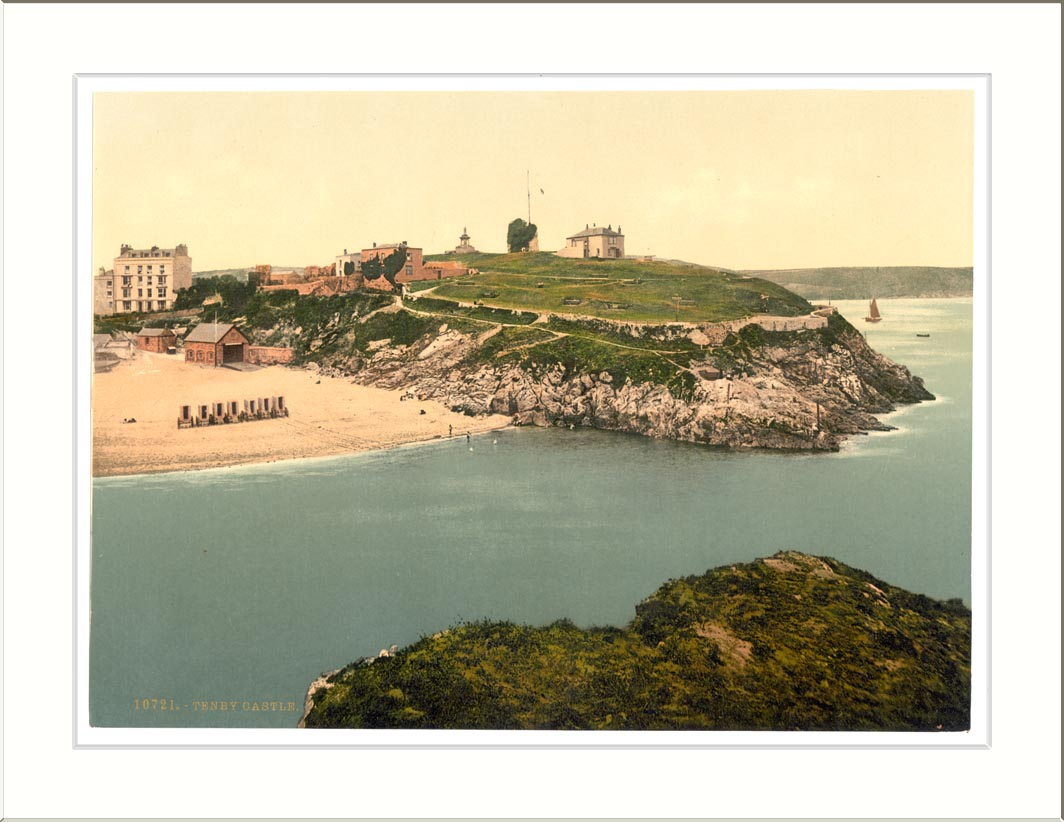
A Victorian postcard showing the remains of Tenby Castle, seen from St Catherine's Island.

The castle, which was sited on a rocky promontory, was founded by the Normans during their invasion of West Wales in the 12th century. A stone tower was built on the headland's highest point which was protected by a curtain wall. The walls had a gateway and several small towers on the landward side. A lesser sea wall surrounded the remainder of the site and the beach area to the west.

In 1153, the castle was captured and destroyed by Maredudd ap Gruffydd and Rhys ap Gruffydd (sons of Gruffydd ap Rhys), the future ruler of the south-western petty kingdom of Deheubarth in mid Wales. The castle was besieged again by the Welsh in 1187. Almost a century later, Llywelyn ap Gruffudd (prince of Gwynedd, and son of Gruffudd ap Llywelyn) sacked the town during his campaigns to retake South Wales in 1260 but the castle was not taken by the Welsh.

=== Abandonment ===
By the late 13th century, Tenby castle and the town had become part of the Marcher Lordship of Pembroke, which by then was ruled by William de Valence who instigated the building of the Tenby town walls, defensive walls around the town rather than just the castle which diminished the defensive importance of Tenby Castle, particularly after the walls were mostly completed by the start of the fourteenth century. By the 1400s the Earldom had reverted to the crown, and Tenby castle was abandoned and in disrepair.

In 1452, King Henry VI gave the Marcher Lordship (and associated Earldom) to Jasper Tudor, his half-brother, who agreed to refurbish and improve Tenby's defences by dividing the cost between himself and the town's merchants. Improvements included widening the dry ditch along the outside of the town walls to 30 feet (9.1 m). Raising the wall's height to include a second tier of higher arrow slits behind a new parapet walk and adding additional turret towers to the ends of the walls where they abutted the cliff edges.

In 1648 during the Second English Civil War, a unit of Royalists under the command of Rice Powell held a refortified Tenby for 10 weeks until they were starved into surrendering by besieging Parliamentarians.

== Present day ==
A few features of the medieval castle remain. A path from Tenby harbour to the top of Castle Hill passes through the main square gateway. On the summit of the promontory is a small tower. A circular walk which was laid out in the 19th century follows the line of the original curtain walls. Tenby Museum & Art Gallery is built on the remains of the castle's domestic building, probably the great hall.

Although the north gate has been demolished to widen the road, Tenby town walls on the north side are largely complete. The eastern walls and towers remain intact.

== See also ==
- Tenby Castle (locomotive)
