= John Poyer =

John Poyer (died 25 April 1649) was a Welsh soldier in the Parliamentary army during the English Civil War in South Wales. He later turned against the parliamentary cause and was executed for treason.

== Background ==
Poyer was a merchant and the mayor of Pembroke town in 1642, when he asked the local MP, Sir Hugh Owen of Orielton, for help in the defence of the county. He became Governor of Pembroke Castle and raised a force on behalf of Parliament, defending the castle against the Royalist commander, Richard Vaughan, 2nd Earl of Carbery.

== Rebellion ==
In March 1644 Poyer led a force that captured Carew Castle from the Royalists. When, in 1647, he was commanded to disband his army and surrender Pembroke Castle, he refused to do so on the grounds that he was owed money. In April 1648 he was contacted by the Prince of Wales and, with the support of other local Parliamentary commanders, Rowland Laugharne and Rice Powell, he joined a Royalist rebellion, culminating in the Battle of St Fagans.

The remaining forces, besieged by Oliver Cromwell himself at Pembroke, surrendered on 11 July 1648, and Poyer, Laugharne and Powell were condemned to death. It was agreed that only one would face the firing squad, and the three men drew lots. The lots would be drawn by a child, and Poyer was the loser. The child is said to have asked him "Did I do well?" Poyer to have responded "Yes, you have done very well". He was executed at Covent Garden, London.

Following Poyer's capture, his widow, Elizabeth, was given assistance by Madam Langhorne, the wife of a former opponent. Following the Restoration of the monarchy, his widow was paid a pension of £300 a year by King Charles II of England.
