= Statue of Oliver Cromwell, Westminster =

Sculpture by Hamo Thornycroft in London

Oliver Cromwell
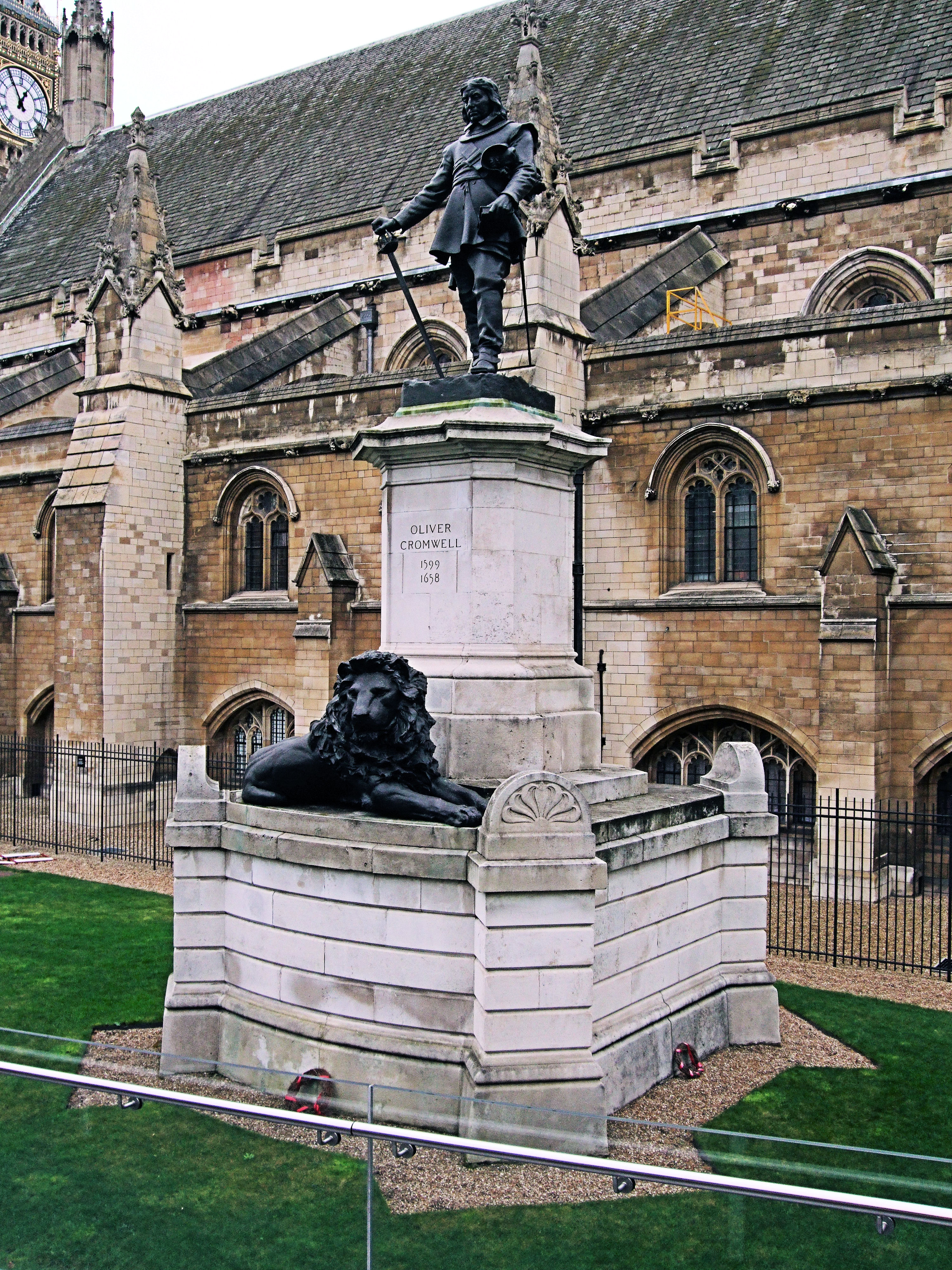
- Artist: Hamo Thornycroft
- Year: 1899; 127 years ago
- Type: Statue
- Medium: Portland stone; bronze
- Subject: Oliver Cromwell
- Location: London, SW1 United Kingdom; 51.499788°N 0.125834°W

A statue of Oliver Cromwell stands outside the House of Commons of the United Kingdom in Westminster, London. Oliver Cromwell was Lord Protector of the Commonwealth of England, Scotland and Ireland between 1653 and 1658. Directly opposite the statue, in the wall of St Margaret's Church, on the other side of the road, is a bust of Charles I.

The statue was designed by Hamo Thornycroft and erected in 1899. It has divided opinion, both before its erection and since, due to Cromwell's opposition to the monarchy and his role in the conquest of Ireland.

The statue is one of five public statues of Cromwell in the United Kingdom and is Grade II listed for its architectural merit.

== Description ==
The statue was sculpted by Hamo Thornycroft and features Cromwell standing holding a sword and a bible. The bible is marked "Holy Bible 1641", and while the main statue of Cromwell is marked "Hamo Thornycroft 1897", the lion on the base is marked "1899".

== History ==
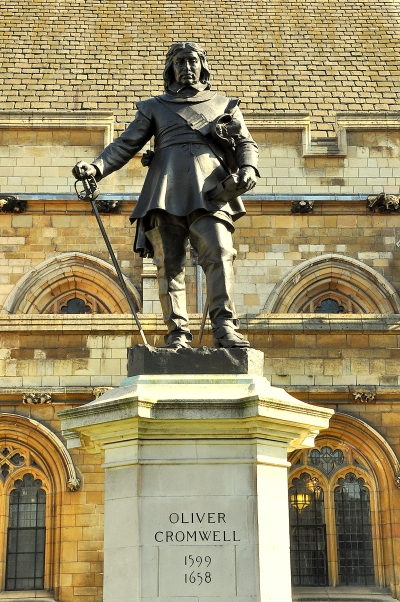
Detail of the statue

Following the fire that destroyed parts of the Palace of Westminster in the 19th century, the question whether or not Oliver Cromwell should have a statue in the reconstruction of the Palace was debated in the pages of The Times, and Punch magazine satirised the issue. The question was raised once more in the House of Commons in 1856, with John George Phillimore saying "any man who could object to a statue of Cromwell must be imbued with bigotry and party spirit in the highest degree". It was raised several more times over the following years by supporters of a statue.

The government publicly proposed a statue of Cromwell for the first time in 1895, which immediately resulted in members of the public questioning the decision due to the divided opinions about Cromwell. The proposal ended in a parliamentary debate and vote, in which the Government narrowly avoided defeat when the Unionists sided with them while the majority of the Conservatives and the Irish National Party voted against the measure because of Cromwell's history in Ireland. The decision was condemned by newspapers in Ireland. Following further opposition from the Irish National Party, the proposal was withdrawn on 17 July 1895. Herbert Gladstone, First Commissioner of Works, approved the statue with the funding coming from an anonymous private donor. In 1899 his successor Aretas Akers-Douglas confirmed the statue's proposed location as the sunken garden next to Westminster Hall. The statue, cast in bronze by Singer of Frome, was unveiled on 31 October 1899, followed by a speech on Cromwell by former Prime Minister Lord Rosebery, who was later revealed as the anonymous donor who paid for the statue.

In 1906, Catholic Liberal MP Ivor Herbert tried to seek the statue's removal from Westminster.

In 2004, a group of Members of Parliament proposed an early day motion that the statue should be removed and melted down. The move was not supported, and other MPs suggested that the statue should be moved somewhere else.

Restoration work took place in August 2008, removing dirt and a coat of black wax that had been applied to the bronzework. This changed the colour of the statue from black to a more natural brown, and potassium sulphide was applied in order to even out the colour of both Cromwell and the lion. It was coated in a clear wax in order to ensure that the natural finish remained. The conservation work was completed in time for the 350th anniversary of Cromwell's death on 3 September 2008.

== See also ==
- Statue of Oliver Cromwell, St Ives
- Statue of Oliver Cromwell, Warrington
