= Statue of Oliver Cromwell, St Ives =

Sculpture in Cambridgeshire, England

Oliver Cromwell
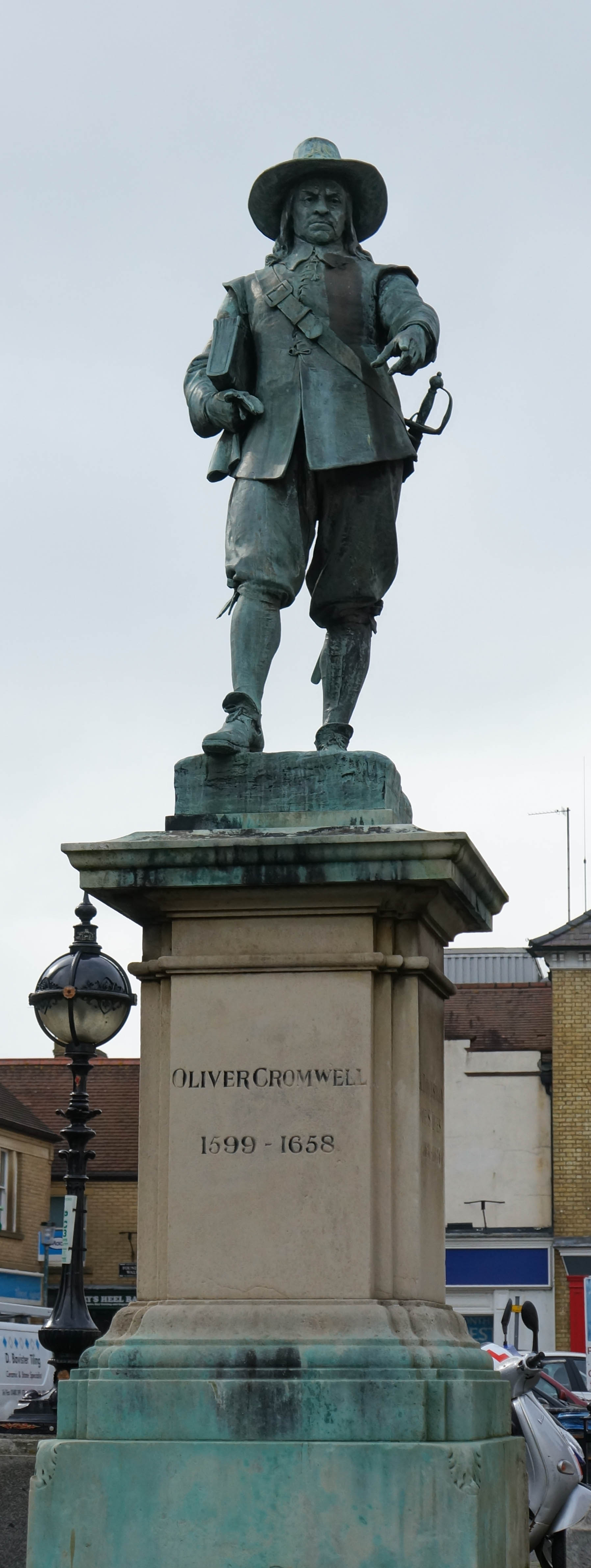
- Year: 1901
- Type: Statue
- Medium: Portland stone; bronze
- Subject: Oliver Cromwell
- Location: St Ives, Cambridgeshire; 52°19′24.25″N 0°4′23.72″W

A statue of Oliver Cromwell stands on Market Hill in St Ives, Cambridgeshire, England. It is a sculpture of Oliver Cromwell, Lord Protector of the Commonwealth of England, Scotland and Ireland. The statue was designed by F. W. Pomeroy and erected in 1901. The statue is one of five public statues of Cromwell in the United Kingdom and is Grade II listed for its architectural merit.

== Description and history ==
The statue was sculpted by F. W. Pomeroy, and features Cromwell standing and pointing. The statue is approached by three steps of Aberdeen granite, with ornamental lamps on each corner.

The location of the statue in the market place in St Ives had been proposed by the historian Thomas Carlyle in an 1849 letter. Carlyle wrote to I.K. Holland that:

"My private suspicion I confess is that the present generation of Englishmen—who have filled their towns with such a set of "public statues" as were never before erected by any people, ugly brazen images (to mere commonplace adventurers with titles on them, and even sometimes to mere paltry scoundrels, worthy of immediate oblivion only)...are not likely to do themselves or anybody much good by setting up statues to Oliver Cromwell. I fear they have forfeited the right to remember Cromwell in a public manner. ...Nevertheless I have privately resolved, if such a thing do go on, to subscribe my little mite to it on occasion, and to wish privately that it may prosper much better than I can with any assurance hope. I think it will be very difficult to avoid the introduction of such an ocean of flummery and mere idle balderdash into the affair (if the public are fairly awoken to it) as will be very distressing to any one who feels how a Cromwell ought to be honoured by the nation that produced him. St. Ives wishes to claim authentically for itself the honour of having once been Oliver Cromwell's place of abode, an honour that is likely to last it, and be its most peculiar one for a thousand years to come. Proper, good every way, and right on the part of St. Ives: while you keep within these limits, the soul of Oliver himself, if he looked down upon you, could not disapprove."

Cromwell had lived in St Ives between 1631 and 1636, at Old Slepe Hall.

In 1899 the nearby town of Huntingdon abandoned their plan to erect a statue to Cromwell, and the opportunity was seized by St Ives. F. W. Pomeroy was commissioned as the sculptor, and the statue was exhibited at the Royal Academy of Arts in London to good reviews. It is the only statue of Cromwell in England that was funded by public donations. The statue has been described as the "...second most visited and photographed monument" in St Ives after the town's bridge chapel on the St Ives Bridge dedicated to St Ledger. The statue was unveiled on 23 October 1901 by the Liberal politician Lord Edmond Fitzmaurice.

== See also ==
- Statue of Oliver Cromwell, Warrington
- Statue of Oliver Cromwell, Westminster
