= Connecticut State Navy =

State navy of Connecticut during the American Revolutionary War

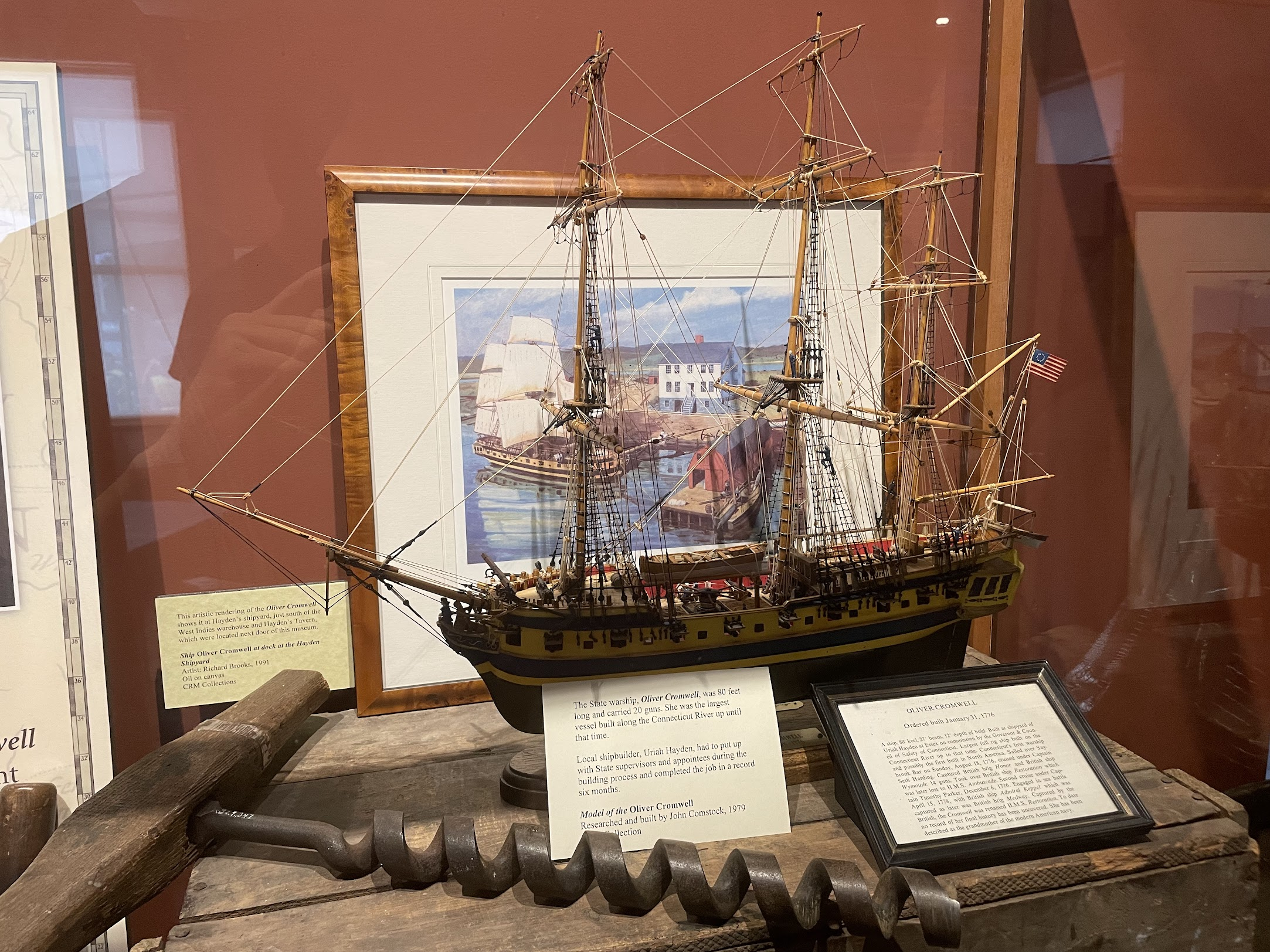
Model of Oliver Cromwell at the Connecticut River Museum

The Connecticut State Navy was the state navy of Connecticut during the American Revolutionary War. It was established in August 1775 by the Connecticut General Assembly to defend Connecticut's merchant shipping and coastal communities from British attacks, along with interdicting smuggling between Connecticut and Long Island. In 1776, the state navy commissioned the submersible Turtle, which allegedly carried out an attack on the British ship of the line HMS Eagle in New York Harbor. Proving unable to counter the overwhelming superiority of the Royal Navy, all of the state navy's ships were lost by July 1779.

== Early acquisitions ==
After the American Revolutionary War began in April 1775, the Connecticut General Assembly in July authorized the Governor and Council of Safety to procure and outfit two armed vessels. On July 24, Governor Jonathan Trumbull and the Council appointed a committee to identify potentially useful vessels in the colony's harbors. On August 2, the committee filed its report, and noted that there was some opposition in the colony to attempting to match the Royal Navy's might. In spite of this, Trumbull and the council decided to outfit William Griswold's 108-ton ship Minerva, and appointed another committee to acquire a "spy vessel, to run and course from place to place, to discover the enemy, and carry intelligence" of about 25 tons, to be captained by Samuel Niles. The next day they hired Giles Hall to be the captain of the Minerva, established a pay scale, and authorized Hall to hire 40 sailors and 40 marines. On August 14, they authorized the purchase of the Britannica, a sloop in Stonington, which was to be renamed Spy, with Robert Niles as its captain.

The Spy began service early in October, and promptly brought in the navy's first prize, a British supply ship. Minerva began service on October 9, with orders to capture transports bound for Quebec. However, most of the crew refused to obey Hall's orders, and she returned to port. The mutinous crew was dismissed, and in December Hall was ordered to return the ship to its owner.

== Expansion ==
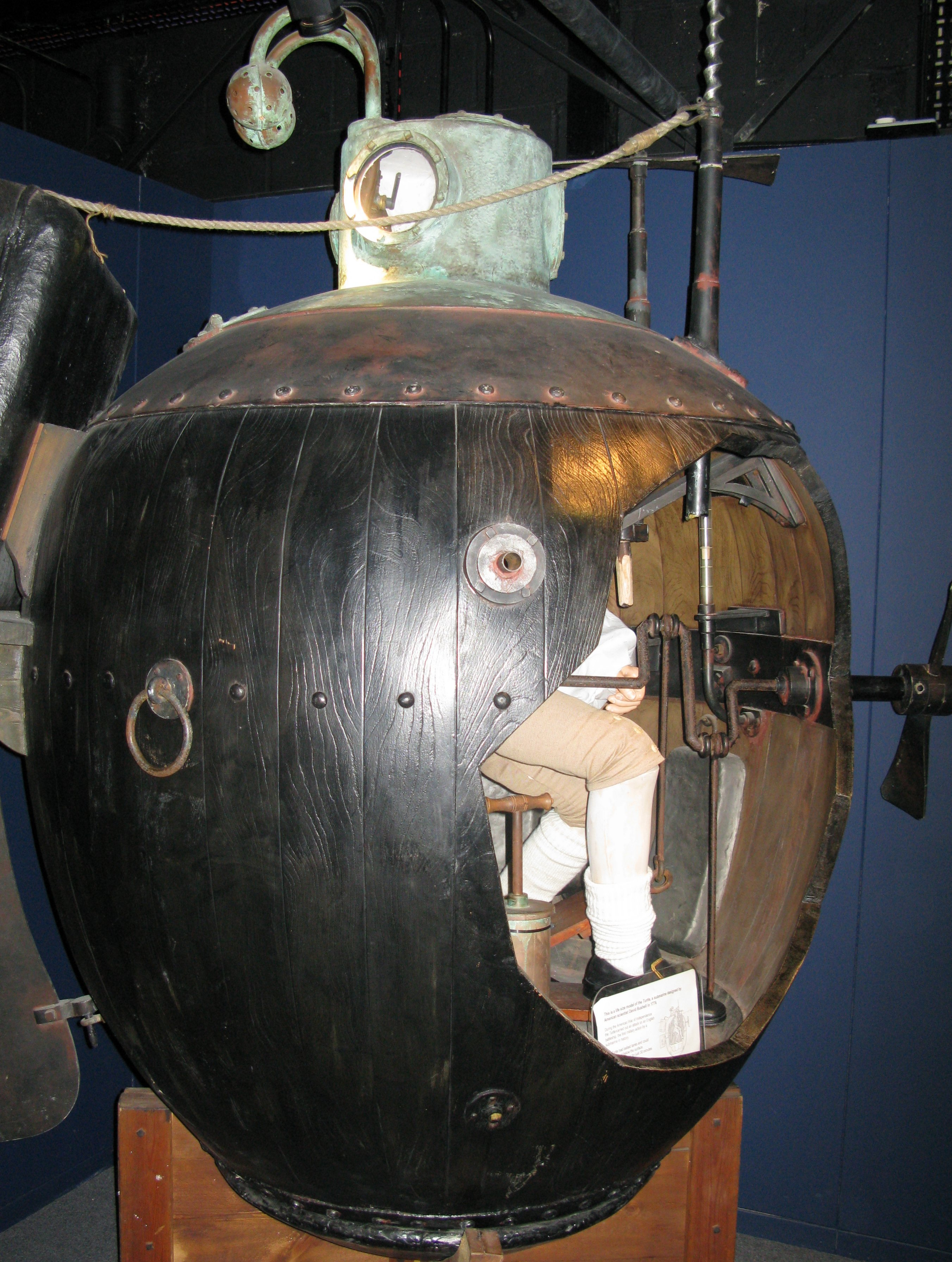
Model of Turtle at the Royal Navy Submarine Museum

In December 1775 the General Assembly authorized the acquisition of more ships, specifically another armed vessel and four row galleys, "for the defence of this and the neighboring colonies." A brigantine was purchased, named Defence, and Seth Harding was given her command; she entered service in April 1776. The governor and council decided to order the construction of a vessel as the third of the authorized ships. This resulted in the June 1776 launch of the 300-ton Oliver Cromwell, with William Coit as its captain. Oliver Cromwell was the first purpose-built warship commissioned by the Connecticut General Assembly--Minerva, Spy, and Defence were all already under construction or launched when purchased. Of the four row galleys, only three were built: Whiting, Shark, and Crane, which were outfitted with sloop riggings, were ready for service in July 1776.

In February 1776, after a presentation by inventor David Bushnell, authorized the payment of £60 so that he could complete the construction of what became Turtle, a small one-man submersible designed to attach a mine to another ship. She was allegedly used in an attempted attack on HMS Eagle in New York harbor in 1776; the attack failed. Turtle was sunk in 1777, but was supposedly recovered later by Bushnell. Additional ships were authorized but had relatively short service lives. The Mifflin and the Schuyler were only in active service in 1777, and Guilford in 1779.

== Administration ==
The assembly had vested in the governor considerable authority in naval matters, including the setting of regulations. As the Continental Navy was also organizationally taking shape, the governor and council assembled a set of regulations that harmonized as much as possible with those of the Continental Navy. They also retained Nathaniel Shaw, a wealthy New London merchant, as the state's agent for outfitting its ships and disposing of its prizes, and also had an agent in Boston to deal with matters when the state's ships or prizes were in Massachusetts ports.

Instead of setting up dedicated admiralty courts, the assembly authorized the state's courts to act as admiralty courts, adjudicating marine disputes and the distribution of prizes, with a right to appeal decisions to the Continental Congress. The state did not issue its own letters of marque; instead, the governor was authorized to issue Congressional letters. In 1779, the state established a formal naval administrative structure, but by then most of its ships had been lost. The state authorized the commission of up to twelve armed vessels in 1780 for the purpose of interdicting smuggling; it retracted the commissions in 1781 after it was established that they had been completely ineffective at stopping illicit trade.

== Operations ==
Most of the navy's cruising was in Long Island Sound, although some ships, notably Spy and Oliver Cromwell, went further afield; further, the three row galleys served in the Hudson River above New York, where the British eventually captured or sank them. Spy served the purpose for which it was purchased, and was one of several ships sent to France in 1778 with news that Congress had ratified the Treaty of Alliance. Of the ships sent, she was the first to arrive; the British captured her on the return voyage. All told, the Connecticut Navy captured about 30 prizes, but all of her ships were captured or destroyed by July 1779. Oliver Cromwell was captured after an engagement off Sandy Hook, New Jersey, and Guilford was captured in July.

== See also ==
- Connecticut Naval Militia
- Oliver Cromwell (ship)

== Sources ==
- Paullin, Charles Oscar (1906). The navy of the American Revolution: its administration, its policy and its achievements. The Burrows Brothers Co. ISBN 9780722277096. This work contains summary information on each of the various state navies.
