= Statue of Oliver Cromwell, Warrington =

Sculpture by John Bell in Warrington, England

Oliver Cromwell
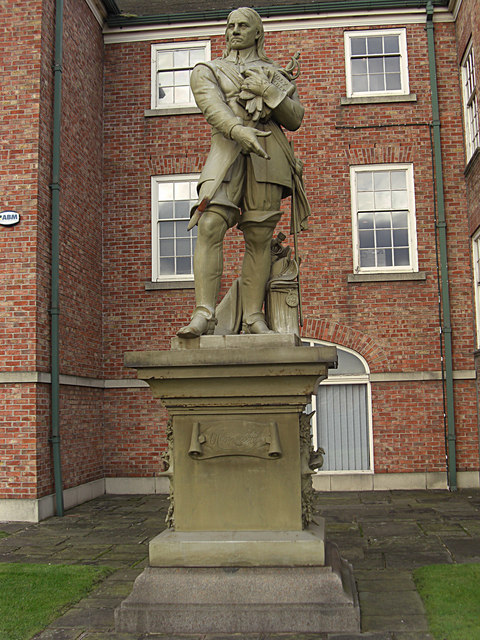
- Year: 1899
- Type: Statue
- Medium: Bronze or cast iron / brass
- Subject: Oliver Cromwell
- Dimensions: 304 cm (120 in)
- Location: Warrington; 53.38613°N 2.59216°W

A statue of Oliver Cromwell stands on Bridge Street in Warrington in Cheshire, England. It is a sculpture of Oliver Cromwell, Lord Protector of the Commonwealth of England, Scotland and Ireland. The statue was designed by John Bell and erected in 1899. The statue is one of five public statues of Cromwell in the United Kingdom and has been Grade II listed since September 1973 for its architectural merit.

== Description and history ==
The statue was made by the London sculptor John Bell and was originally displayed at the 1862 London Exhibition, where it stood at the centre of a fountain. It was presented to the town in 1899 by local councillor Frederick Monks to mark the 300th anniversary of Cromwell's birth. It stands in front of Warrington Academy, and consists of a standing iron figure on a square plinth with a sword and bible. Cromwell is shown without his hat. It is inscribed with "Cromwell" as a signature. There was opposition to the statue from the local Irish community.

In a letter to the council in January 1899 Monks stated that:

"My dear Mr. Mayor, The tri-centenary of the birth of Oliver Cromwell occurs on the 26th April of this year and it occurs to me as a fitting opportunity to offer my fellow townshipmen a fine statue of a remarkable man, to be placed in the front of the Town Hall or in the Gardens behind, as the council may determine. I know there are different estimates of the character of this statesman, but I think all will admit the wisdom and courage with which he guided the affairs of state at a critical time in the history of the country, and how nobly he made sacrifices to preserve the religious and political liberties of her people. I shall be obliged if you will allow me to make the offer through you to the Council, and if accepted I will arrange to deliver it to you as early as convenient."

The acceptance and erection of the statue was vigorously debated by Warrington Town Council.

== See also ==
- Statue of Oliver Cromwell, St Ives
- Statue of Oliver Cromwell, Westminster
