= Oliver Cromwell (ship) =

1776 warship of the Connecticut State Navy in the American Revolution

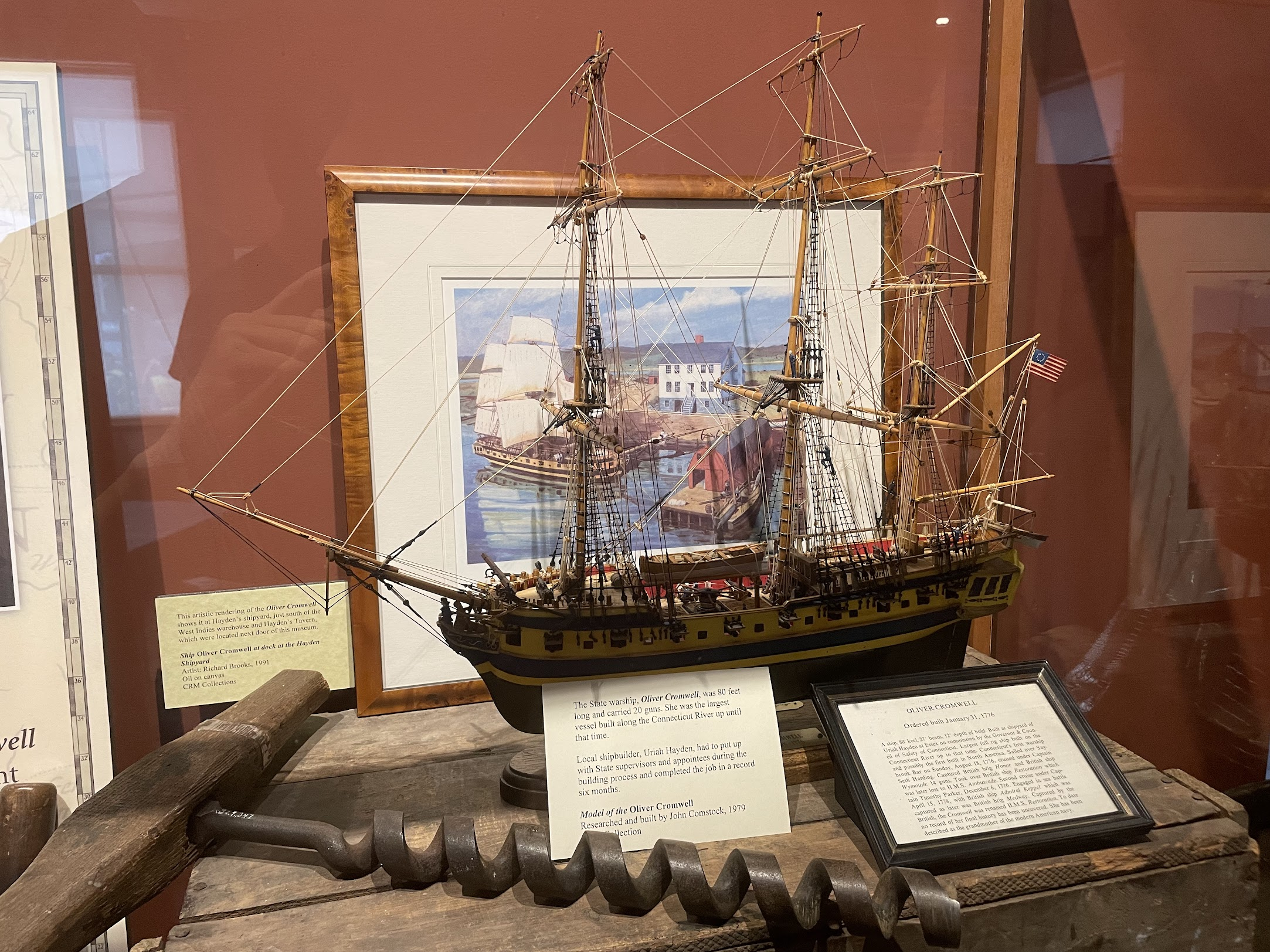
- A model of the Oliver Cromwell displayed in the Connecticut River Museum.

History
- Name: Oliver Cromwell
- Namesake: Oliver Cromwell
- Operator: Connecticut State Navy
- Ordered: January 1, 1776
- Builder: Uriah Hayden
- Laid down: April 2,1776
- Launched: June 13, 1776
- Completed: August 18, 1776
- Captured: June 6, 1779

Great Britain
- Name: Restoration
- Acquired: 6 June 1779

Great Britain
- Name: HMS Loyalist
- Owner: Royal Navy
- Acquired: 1779
- Captured: 30 August 1781 by France

France
- Name: Loyaliste
- Owner: French Navy
- Acquired: 30 August 1781
- Commissioned: September 1781
- Fate: Donated to United States, November 1781

United States
- Name: Loyaliste
- Acquired: November 1781

General characteristics
- Type: corvette
- Tons burthen: 300 (bm)
- Length: 80 ft (24 m)
- Beam: 27 ft (8.2 m)
- Depth of hold: 12 ft (3.7 m)
- Complement: 180 officers and enlisted
- Armament: 20 guns

Service record

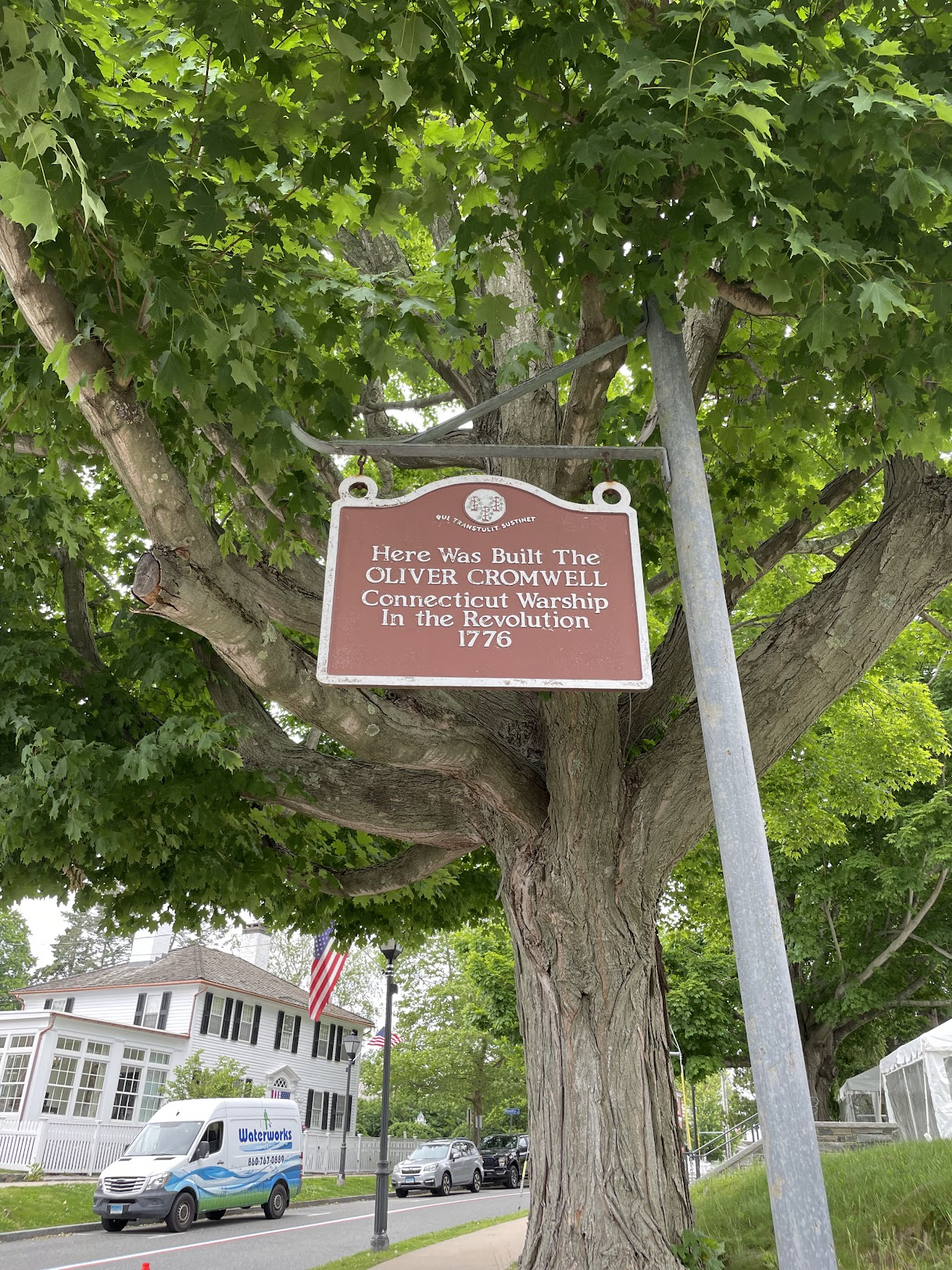
This sign in Essex, Connecticut, marks the spot where the warship Oliver Cromwell was constructed in 1776.

Oliver Cromwell was a 20-gun frigate of the Connecticut State Navy launched on 13 June 1776. British ships captured her in a battle off the coast of Sandy Hook, New Jersey, on 6 June 1779, renaming her Restoration. She was purchased by the Royal Navy in 1779, which renamed her HMS Loyalist. In May 1781 her captain was Morgan Laugharne. Later that year, she was captured by France and returned to American service under the name Loyaliste.

== History ==
=== Construction ===
Upon the outbreak of the American Revolutionary War, the Connecticut General Assembly in July 1775 authorized Governor Jonathan Trumbull to purchase and outfit two armed vessels, the largest of which would be Oliver Cromwell. Under the supervision of Capt. Seth Harding, ship builder Uriah Hayden began preliminary work for the project on 30 January. Work began in the Hayden family shipyard that sat on the Connecticut River in Saybrook (Essex), Connecticut, on April 2, and continued until the ship's launch on 13 June 1776.

When launched, the three-masted brig was the largest fully-rigged warship in the Continental Navy, and carried twenty guns. She weighed 300 tons, had an eighty-foot keel, was twenty-seven feet wide, and had a hold twelve feet deep.

=== Capture of Admiral Keppel ===
In the spring of 1778 Oliver Cromwell set sail from Boston with Defence for the West Indies, stopping in Charleston, S.C., for refitting. On April 15, while sailing east of St. Kitts, the pair encountered two British ships, Admiral Keppel and Cyrus, and captured them. On board Admiral Keppel, and taken prisoner, was Henry Shirley, the former British Ambassador to Russia, and other bureaucrats, and their families, who were en route to Kingston, Jamaica, to relay instructions from London to the colony. Admiral Keppel was sailed to Boston and sold for £22,321, and, after some deliberation by Gov. Trumbull, Mr. Shirley and the other captives were permitted to continue to Kingston under a flag of truce.

=== End of Service with the Connecticut Navy ===
A hurricane struck Oliver Cromwell while she was off the coast of the Bahamas in which she was stripped of her masts. In June 1779 she encountered British ships off Sandy Hook and was forced to strike her colors after a battle lasting several hours. After her capture, the British refitted her and commissioned her as Restoration. From there, the ship was purchased by the Royal Navy and commissioned as HMS Loyalist.

=== Royal Navy ===
HMS Loyalist was fitted as a 14-gun sloop. In 1780 Admiral Arbuthnot placed John Plumer Ardesoife in command of Loyalist. He immediately proceeded to terrorize the inhabitants of the Sea Islands, arousing opposition to the British. Around this time Loyalist took the sloop George, of 25 tons burthen, William Stein master. George was condemned at the vice admiralty court in Savannah on 23 August 1780. While under Ardesoife's command Loyalist also took some prizes at George Town.

She was under the command of Captain Richard Williams when the French captured her in the Chesapeake on 30 August 1781. According to French sources, Loyalist and the frigate Guadeloupe were on picket duty when they encountered the French fleet under Admiral de Grasse. Guadeloupe escaped up the York River to York Town, where her crew would later scuttle her. The English court martial records report that Loyalist was returning to the British fleet off the Jersey coast when she encountered the main French fleet. The French frigate Aigrette, with the 74-gun Glorieux in sight, was able to overtake Loyalist.

=== French service ===
The French took her into service as Loyaliste in September. On 15 September she arrived at Yorktown, De Grasse having detached her to escort in some grenadiers and chasseurs. Her commander, briefly, was lieutenant de vaisseau Pascal Melchior Philibert de Barras-Saint-Laurent, son of Admiral de Barras.

Shortly thereafter, in November, the French gave her to the Americans. In her brief French service she is described as carrying 22 guns, probably 14 guns plus eight swivel guns.

== Bibliography ==
- Colledge, J. J.; Warlow, Ben (2006) [1969]. Ships of the Royal Navy: The Complete Record of All Fighting Ships of the Royal Navy from the 15th Century to the Present (3rd Rev ed.). London: Chatham Publishing. ISBN 978-1-86176-281-8. OCLC 67375475.
- Demerliac, Alain (1996). La marine de Louis XVI : nomenclature des navires français de 1774 à 1792 (in French). Omega. OCLC 1254967392.
- Gallatin, Gaspard Gabriel (1931) Journal of the siege of York-town: unpublished journal of the siege of York-town in 1781 operated by the General staff of the French army. (Washington:United States Government Printing Office).
- Hepper, David J. (1994). British Warship Losses in the Age of Sail, 1650-1859. Rotherfield: Jean Boudriot. ISBN 0-948864-30-3.
- Olsberg, R.Nicholas (1973). "Ship Registers in the South Carolina Archives 1734-1780". South Carolina Historical Magazine. 74 (4): 189–299. JSTOR 27567207.
