= Nathaniel Shaw =

- Born: September 26, 1703; Fairfield, Connecticut Colony (now Fairfield), Connecticut
- Died: August 26, 1778 (aged 74) New London, Connecticut

Nathaniel Shaw Jr. (1703—1778) was a Connecticut Patriot, and an American Revolutionary War soldier. He is frequently referred to as "Captain Nathaniel Shaw, Jr."

== Life and career ==
Nathaniel Shaw was a successful merchant who came to live in New London from Fairfield CT. He purchased land along Bank Street in 1734, with his wife Temperance. In 1756, Shaw hired Acadian exiles to build a mansion from the granite ledge at the edge of the river. The Shaw Mansion was used as the Naval Headquarters for the state of Connecticut during the Revolutionary war. His son, Nathaniel Shaw Jr. was appointed by both the Continental Congress and the State of Connecticut as the naval agent during the American Revolutionary War, and he had the responsibility of drawing up orders for privateers as well as distributing captured prizes. His Shaw Mansion (New London, Connecticut) is now the headquarters of the New London County Historical Society.
