= Bendish (disambiguation) =

Bendish is a hamlet in Hertfordshire, England.

Bendish may also refer to:

- Bendish baronets
- Thomas Bendish
- Bridget Bendish
