= Il Cromuele =

1671 book by Girolamo Graziani

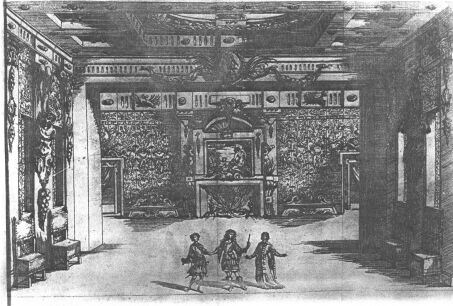
- Illustration from the first edition (1671) (Italian)
- Author: Girolamo Graziani
- Original title: Il Cromuele, Tragedia Del Co: Girolamo Gratiani Segretario, e Consigliere di Stato del Serenissimo signor Duca di Modana. Alla Mestà Christianissima di Luigi XIIII, Rè di Francia, e di Navarra
- Language: Italian
- Genre: Tragedy, historical drama
- Publisher: Manolessi (Italy)
- Publication date: 1671
- Publication place: Italy
- Pages: 160
- Preceded by: L'Ercole Gallico. Alle Glorie della Sacratissima Maestà del re Cristianissim. Luigi XIV. Panegirico in Sesta Rima, Modena, Soliani, 1666
- Followed by: Applauso profetico alle Glorie del re Cristianissimo Luigi XIV. panegirico in Sesta Rima, Modena, Soliani, 1673

Il Cromuele (The Cromwell) is a tragedy in five acts, released in 1671. It was conceived and written by Girolamo Graziani, through the 1660s in Modena, during the troubled reign of Laura Martinozzi.

== Genesis ==
The first piece of information on the composition of Il Cromuele appears in the preface to Graziani's Varie Poesie e Prose (1662).

Since 1666 the writing of Il Cromuele has been accompanied by an extensive correspondence with Jean Chapelain, as Graziani was waged by Jean-Baptiste Colbert on behalf of Louis XIV.

== Plot ==
Henrighetta (Henrietta Maria of France), Queen of England has escaped from Cromuele (Oliver Cromwell), the tyrant usurper who imprisoned her husband King Carlo (Charles I of England) in the Tower of London. After useless petitions to the Government of Edinburgh and to the Republic of the Seven United Netherlands, she sails towards France to ask for help from her nephew Louis XIV.

She is accompanied by Delmira, a young Irish girl she met during the trip. The two women, for their security, disguise themselves as men and claim to be Dutch Merchants. During the voyage, their ship crashes and their lifeboat is pushed by the wind to the English coast. From there they reach London under the identities of Henrico (Henry) and Edmondo (Edmund).

In this guise, they find refuge in the Palace of Odoardo ( Edward ) and Anna ( Anne ) Hide, a family in pectore still loyalist despite showing fidelity to Cromuele. The beauty and skillful singing of Edmondo/Delmira earns the two women an invitation to Whitehall to attend a major Costume party that Cromuele has ordered to distract Londoners from the consequences of his despotic government and a looming plague.

With the arrival of Edmondo/Delmira and Henrico/Henrighetta, tragedy begins.

It is now the eve of King's decapitation. The death warrant has not yet been issued. Elisabetta ( Elizabeth ), the wife of Cromuele wants her husband to postpone the decision as she's secretly in love with the King. Her confidant Orinda, an elder widow sensitive to [love affairs, schedules her clandestine meeting with Carlo within the prison, where Elisabetta will be able to offer him clemency in exchange for love.

To arrange such an encounter, Orinda asks for help from Edmondo/Delmira (of whom she fell in love with, under the impression that she was a boy) and of Henrico/Henrighetta, reassured by their seeming foreigness.

The two heroines take this opportunity to free Carlo, with the help of Odoardo and Anna Hide, who in the meantime have revealed their true identities. The discovery of the conspiracy, however, precipitates the fate of Carlo who is executed at dawn as well as Edmondo/Delmira who, dying, has time to prove her identity, and through some details of her story, Orinda recognizes her as her daughter, who was sent abroad when very young to save her from a prophecy of dying at home foretold by relatives. Overwhelmed with grief, Orinda commits suicide on what she believes to be her daughter's corpse.

After the regicide, Cromuele can finally sleep, but his sleep is interrupted by a nightmare in which Mary Stuart heralds the end of his power. Upon awakening, Cromuele receives the glad tidings of the existence of a newborn daughter previously believed to be dead, but is found to still be alive because she was swapped with Orinda's child whilst in a bassinet.

However, his happiness is short-lived because the anagnorisis plunges him into utter turmoil when he discovers that his beloved daughter was actually the Edmondo/Delmira he has just executed.

== Il Cromuele between history and fiction ==
- During the Restoration, on the anniversary of the regicide, the corpse of Oliver Cromwell (Cromuele) was exhumed and subjected to Posthumous execution. In the year of the publication of Il Cromuele, his head was still exposed in Westminster. The event is evoked through the premonition of Mary Stuart.
- Along with Oliver Cromwell, Charles I (Carlo) and their respective wives Elizabeth Bourchier (Elisabetta) and Henrietta Maria of France (Henrighetta), we find Anne Hyde (Anna) first wife of James I and her father: Edward Hyde, 1st Earl of Clarendon (Odoardo) whom, after giving initial support to the Commonwealth, changed his party back to the Royalists. Also appearing in the play, or are mentioned in their proper political positions, are Generals of the New Model Army such as John Lambert (Lamberto), Henry Ireton (Iretone), Thomas Harrison (Harrisone) and Thomas Fairfax (Farfasse).
- Even the two fictional characters have a precise reference to history or to contemporary chronicle. The death of Delmira caused by her father Cromuele, plunges him into complete despair and Orinda, an elderly widow hypersensitive to matters of love, becomes herself a victim of love. They both point to real people: The former is a direct reference to the favorite daughter of Cromwell, Elizabeth Claypole who broke off relations with her father as she disagreed with him on the trial and execution of Charles I. Elizabeth died when she was 29, as did Delmira, and her eventual death after a long and painful illness seemed to be the fatal blow to the deteiorating health of her father, who died a month later. The event struck the imagination of his contemporaries who found in it a form of nemesis for the regicide committed. The latter, Orinda, is a direct reference to the Welsh poet Katherine Philips, whose poems mainly concerned love, marriage, and romantic relationships in general. She attracted interest and scandal for her theories on Love between women. Her pen name was The Matchless Orinda.

== Performance history ==
The Preface to the second edition of Il Cromuele (1673), shows no trace of its premiere. There is also no trace of it in the rich documentation of the Este's National Archives in Modena.

The most probable cause of this disappearance is the dynastic marriage which occurred in 1673 (then only two years after the first publication) between Mary of Modena and James Stuart, the latter newly widowed by the afformentioned Anne Hyde with whom, in Il Cromuele, he appears in love. A presence unwieldy for Graziani who, as Secretary of State, made sure to keep the interests of the House of Este in the marriage.

In modern times, Il Cromuele has been represented in Piacenza in the theatre season 1996–97 by Piacenza's Company Gli Infidi Lumi, directed by Stefano Tomassini, music by Massimo Berzolla.

== Editions ==
- Bologna, Manolessi, 1671 in −4°
- Modena, Soliani, 1671 in −12°
- Bologna, Manolessi, 1673 in −4°
- [Piacenza], Infidi Lumi Edizioni, 1997 (out of print edition, theater adaptation by Stefano Tomassini)
- Pisa, Edizioni della Normale, 2011, in: Storie Inglesi, l'Inghilterra vista dall'Italia tra storia e romanzo (XVIII sec.) edited by Clizia Carminati e Stefano Villani, pagg. 297 – 470.

== Bibliography ==
- Emilio Bertana, L'irregolarità del teatro profano: il «Cromuele» di Girolamo Graziani, in: Storia dei generi letterari italiani, la Tragedia, Milano, Vallardi, [1916?], pages 200–10.
- Piero Di Nepi, Girolamo Graziani e la politica come arte: «Cromuele», "F.M. Annali dell'Istituto di Filologia Moderna dell'Università di Roma, 2-1979, Roma, 1981, pages 113–24 (see Fulvio Bianchi in: "La Rassegna della Letteratura italiana" diretta da Walter Binni, sept.dec. 1982, pages 620–1).
- Rosa Galli Pellegrini, La Tragédie Italienne à l'école du classicisme Français: le rôle de Chapelain dans la genèse du "Cromuele" de Graziani, “Quaderni del Dipartimento di Lingue e Letterature Straniere Moderne, Università di Genova”, 2–1987, peges 35–57.
- Maurizio Fasce, Introduzione e note alle edizioni de Il Cromuele, con la collaborazione di Carlo Alberto Girotto, Storie Inglesi, l'Inghilterra vista dall'Italia tra storia e romanzo (XVIII sec.), edited by Clizia Carminati e Stefano Villani, Edizioni della Normale, Pisa, 2011, pagg. 297 – 330.
