= Elizabeth Cromwell =

Wife of Oliver Cromwell, a 17th-century English military and political leader

Her Highness Elizabeth Cromwell
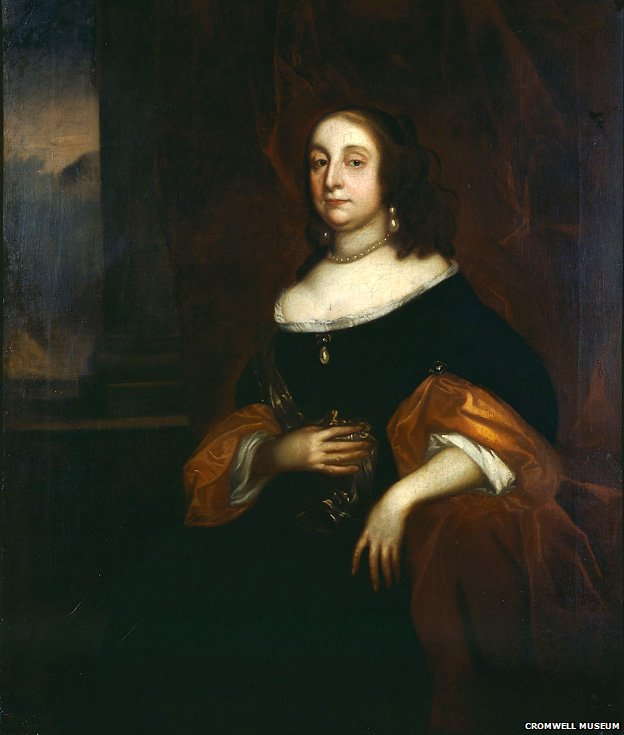
- Portrait of Elizabeth Cromwell painted by Robert Walker
- Born: Elizabeth Bourchier; 1598; Felsted, Essex, Kingdom of England
- Died: November 1665 (aged 66–67); Northborough, Cambridgeshire, Kingdom of England
- Spouse: Oliver Cromwell (m. 1620; died 1658)
- Children: Robert Cromwell; Oliver Cromwell; Bridget Cromwell; Richard Cromwell; Henry Cromwell; Elizabeth Cromwell; James Cromwell; Mary Cromwell; Frances Cromwell
- Parent(s): Sir James Bourchier; Frances Crane

Elizabeth Cromwell (née Bourchier; 1598 – 1665) was the wife of Oliver Cromwell, Lord Protector of the Commonwealth of England, Scotland and Ireland, and the mother of Richard Cromwell, the second Lord Protector.

== Family and marriage ==
Elizabeth was the daughter of Sir James Bourchier of Felsted in Essex, a wealthy London leather merchant, and his wife Frances Crane, daughter of Thomas Crane of Newton Tony in Wiltshire. In 1610, Sir James Bourchier obtained a grant of arms (Sable, three ounces in passant in pale or spotted); the only occasion when the arms of the Bourchiers were quartered with those of the Protector was at his funeral, where they appeared on the escutcheons.

Elizabeth, the eldest of twelve children, was born in 1598. On 22 August 1620 at St Giles, Cripplegate, London, she married Oliver Cromwell.

Throughout the marriage, Oliver wrote Elizabeth solicitous love letters while away on his military campaigns. Some of these letters were later published in an anthology of love letters edited by Antonia Fraser in 1976. The marriage produced nine children, eight of whom reached adulthood.

Like her husband, Elizabeth was attacked in royalist propaganda and accused of personal vices. In these texts, Elizabeth was often a contemptuously styled "Joan" (at the time, seen as a name with low associations). She was accused of drunkenness and adultery, which John Heneage Jesse concluded were "venomous absurdities" and "unworthy of notice". As the charges appear to have been unfounded, the libels fell harmless.

Elizabeth is said to have had a defect in one of her eyes.

Elizabeth is known to have been introduced to Charles I who was then a prisoner at Hampton Court. Since she was still on good terms with her husband, Ashburnham presented her to the King with the ladies of Henry Ireton and Edward Whalley, and she was afterward entertained.

== Protectress (1653–1658) ==
After Oliver Cromwell was proclaimed Lord Protector in December 1653, Elizabeth became Her Highness the Lady Protector. Martyn Bennett suggests that she "was apparently never comfortable with being the wife of the head of state". Although Elizabeth seems to have focused on managing the household and avoided becoming embroiled in public political activity, she was still a target for politically motivated abuse.

"She very frugally housewifed it" says James Heath, "and would nicely and finically tax the expensive unthriftiness (as she said) of the other woman [Henrietta Maria] who lived there before her". One book, entitled the Court and Kitchen of Mrs. Joan Cromwell, complained about Elizabeth's supposedly parsimonious nature and the miserly nature of her household arrangements. It suggested that "Much ado had she at first to raise her mind and deportment to this sovereign grandeur; and very difficult it was for her to lay aside those impertinent meannesses of her private fortune: like the bride-cat, by Venus's favour metamorphosed into a comely virgin, that could not forbear catching at mice, she could not comport with her present condition, nor forget the common converse and affairs of life. But like some kitchen-maid, preferred by the lust of some rich and noble dotard, was ashamed of her sudden and gaudy bravery, and for a while skulked up and down the house, till the fawning observance and reverences of her slaves had raised her to a confidence, not long after sublimed into an impudence."

Elizabeth's behaviour concerning her elevation is represented differently by the republican Edmund Ludlow who happened to know her personally. He wrote that when the Cromwells changed residence from the Cockpit at Whitehall to the royal palace, Elizabeth was anything but gratified with the splendid change in her domestic arrangements. Heath, on the contrary, asserts, "she was trained up and made the waiting woman of Cromwell's providence, and lady rampant of his successful greatness, which she personated afterwards as imperiously as himself".

The writer Lilburne implied that Elizabeth had some influence over her husband, since he accused her of having disposed of military appointments during Cromwell's generalship. Granger recorded hearing, "that she was as deeply interested herself in steering the helm, as she had often done in turning the spit; and that she was as constant a spur to her husband in the career of his ambition, as she had been to her servants in their culinary employments". However, Jesse argued that Elizabeth "seems to have laudably confined herself to the details of domestic life, nor is there any authenticated instance of her having exercised the slightest political influence over her husband. Besides, not one of her relations were partakers of her greatness, and Cromwell's behaviour to her appeared throughout to have been rather that of a man who respects his wife as the mother of his children, than for any mental or personal qualifications of her own". He also pointed out "the singular and undoubted fact that she endeavoured to persuade her husband to recall the young King", without success.

Only one letter written by Elizabeth is thought to be extant. Contained among Milton's State Papers, it is an affectionate letter addressed to the Protector. Jesse called the orthography "wretched, even for the period in which it was written".

Elizabeth maintained six daughters of clergymen, whom she employed at needlework in her apartments.

== Later years (1658–1665) ==
Following her husband's death in 1658 and her son's abdication in 1659, the Cromwells lost influence in state affairs. However, the army compelled the Parliament to settle a suitable livelihood for Elizabeth.

After the Restoration of the Monarchy in 1660, Elizabeth planned to flee England, collecting many valuables to take with her. After these plans became known to the council of state, a survey was ordered. Several articles belonging to the royal family were discovered and confiscated. The seizure was announced in the journals of the period:

"Whitehall, May 12, 1660. Information being given that there were several of his Majesty's goods at a fruiterer's warehouse near the Three Cranes, in Thames Street, London, which were there kept as the goods of Mrs. Eliz. Cromwell, wife to Oliver Cromwell, deceased, sometimes called Protector, and it being not very improbable that the said Mrs. Cromwell might convey away some such goods, the Council ordered persons to view the same". "May 16, 1660. Amongst the goods that were pretended to be Mrs. Cromwell's, at the fruiterer's warehouse, are discovered some pictures, and other things belonging to his Majesty: the remainder lay attached in the custody of Lieut. Col. Cox."

Granger believed that Elizabeth resided for some time in Switzerland after her family's downfall, but this is still unsupported. She did retire for a short period in Wales, where she remained until the excitement surrounding the Restoration subsided. She then moved to the house of her son-in-law, John Claypole, at Northborough in Northamptonshire, where she remained until she died in November 1665 and was buried in Northborough church on 19 November. (Note: John Jesse states that she died on 8 October 1672 (Jesse 1846, p. 151). Mark Nobel speculates that although the register says that Elizabeth Cromwell, the widow of Oliver, was buried in Northbrough, on 19 November 1665 that this was only a political death, because she feared persecution and thought it prudent to be supposed dead. Nobel based this speculation on information provided by the Reverend James Clearke of Peterbrought. (Noble 1784b, p. vii))

== Children ==
Elizabeth died in 1665 and was survived by five of her nine children, as well as many grandchildren.

- Robert Cromwell (baptised 13 October 1621– May 1639), died while away at school.
- Oliver Cromwell (baptised 6 February 1623 (Note: Julian calendar with the start of year adjusted to 1 January (Old Style and New Style dates)) – 1644), who became a cornet in Lord St. John's troop in the army of the Earl of Essex, and died of smallpox.
- Bridget Cromwell (baptised 4 August 1624 – 1681), married firstly Henry Ireton (on 15 June 1646), and secondly Charles Fleetwood (in 1652). She had one son and three daughters by her first husband.
- Richard Cromwell (4 October 1626 – 12 July 1712). In 1658 he succeeded his father as Lord Protector, but the Protectorate collapsed one year later. In May 1649 he married Dorothy Maijor, daughter of Richard Maijor. Richard and Dorothy had nine children with four reaching adulthood.
- Henry Cromwell (20 January 1628 – 23 March 1674) Served as Lord Deputy of Ireland. He married Elizabeth Russell, with whom he had seven children.
- Elizabeth Cromwell (baptised 2 July 1629 – August 1658), married John Claypole, with whom she had four children. Elizabeth was known as "Bettie" and was said to have been her father's favourite child.
- James Cromwell (born and died in 1632).
- Mary Cromwell (baptised 9 February 1637 – 19 November 1713), married Thomas Belasyse, 1st Earl Fauconberg.
- Frances Cromwell (6 December 1638 – 27 January 1721), married firstly Robert Rich, and secondly Sir John Russell, 3rd Baronet.

=== Portrait gallery ===
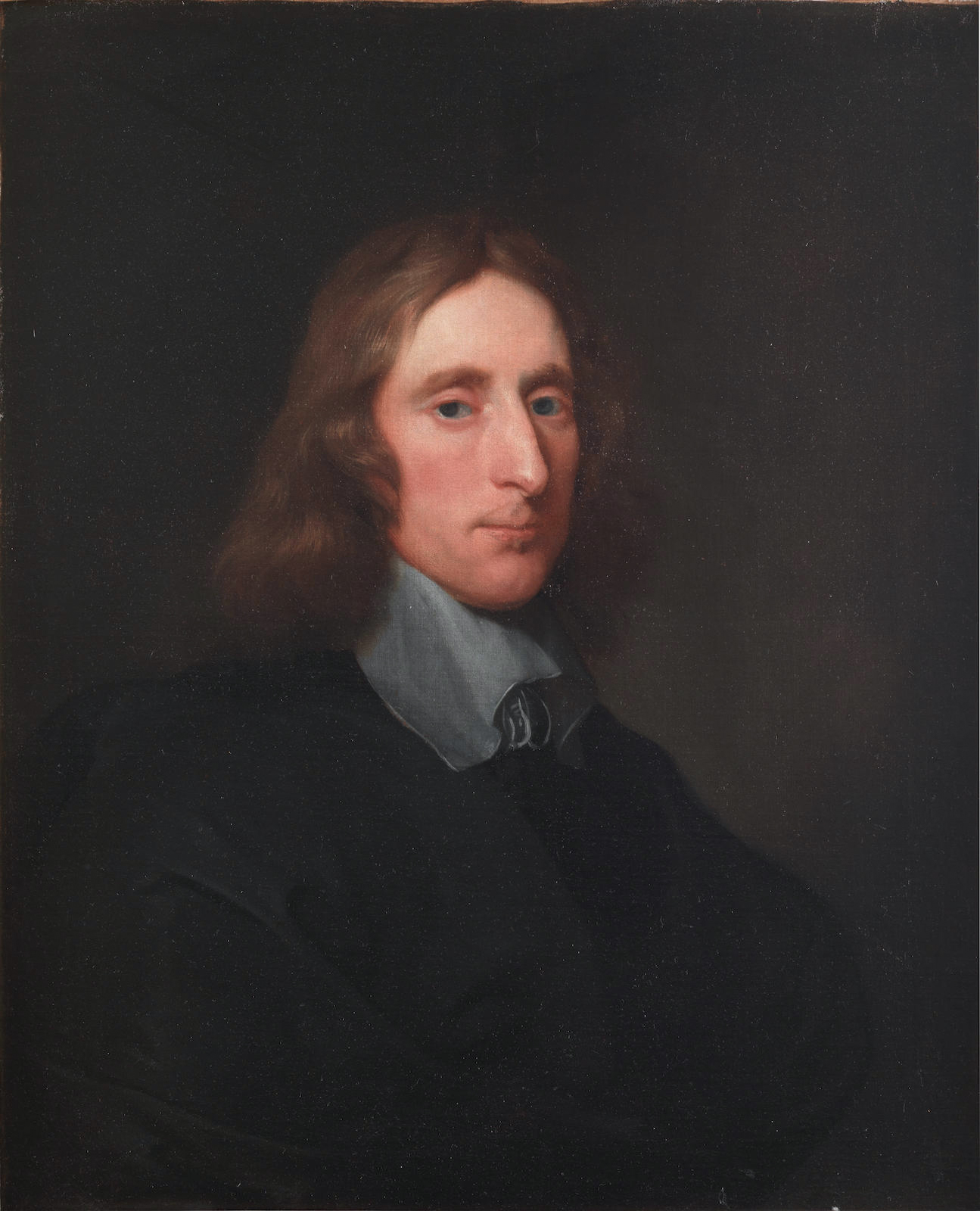
Richard Cromwell

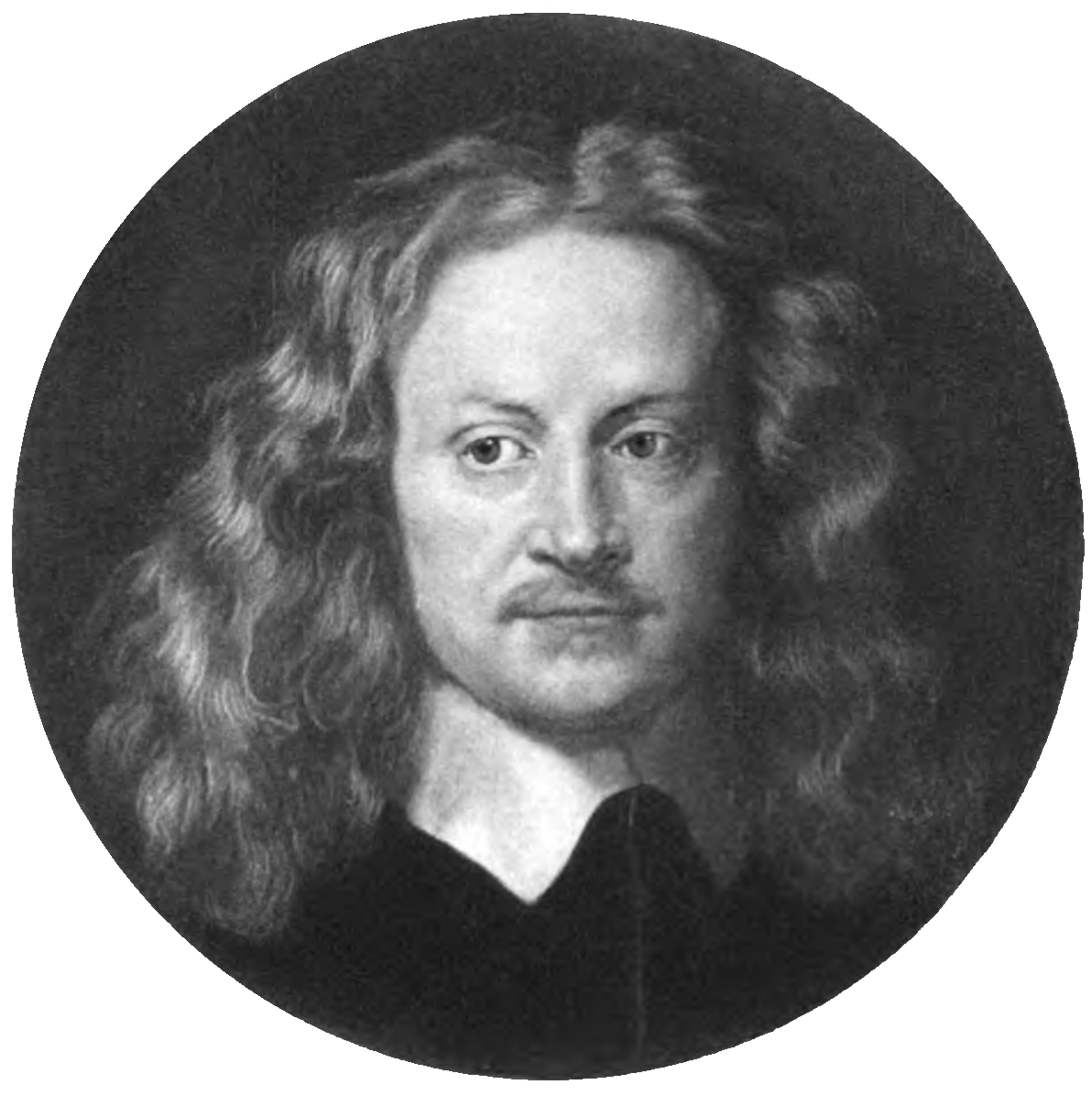
Henry Cromwell

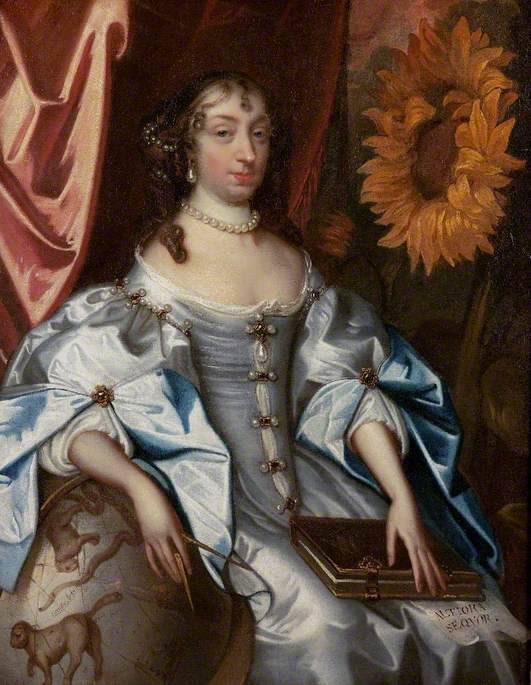
Lady Elizabeth Claypole

== Cultural depictions ==
During her lifetime, Elizabeth was the subject of several satirical pamphlets. A pasquinade entitled The Cuckoo's Nest at Westminster (1648) included ludicrous dialogue between the Protectress and Lady Fairfax. This broadside, printed before Cromwell's inauguration in the Protectorship, exhibits how early and how generally the Lord Protector's public views of personal aggrandizement were challenged by some contemporaries. Henry Neville's scurrilous pamphlet News from the New Exchange (1650) accused Elizabeth of intemperance and a love of intrigue. A seventeenth century satirical pamphlet cookbook, The Court and Kitchen of Elizabeth, Commonly Called Joan Cromwell, the Wife of the Late Usurper, portrayed her insultingly as a parsimonious housekeeper "a hundred times fitter for a barn than a palace".

A miniature of Elizabeth was painted by Samuel Cooper, who described her as "neither uncomely or undignified in person." Other writers portrayed her as unattractive, including Abraham Cowley who, in his play The Cutter of Colman Street (1661), put the following passage into the mouth of Cutter: "He [Worm] would have been my lady Protectress's poet: he writ once a copy in praise of her beauty; but her Highness gave for it but an old half-crown piece in gold, which she had hoarded up before these troubles, and that discouraged him from any further applications to court." Cowley's reference to the hoarding of the half-crown piece also alluded to her supposed thriftiness.

Elizabeth Cromwell is a character in Aphra Behn's 1681 comedic play, The Roundheads or, The Good Old Cause.

William Fisk depicted Elizabeth and her children supposedly begging Oliver Cromwell to spare the king's life, in his sentimental painting Cromwell's Family Interceding for the Life of Charles I (1840).

In the 1970 film Cromwell, Elizabeth Cromwell was played by Zena Walker (with the part of Oliver Cromwell played by Irish actor Richard Harris).

== Sources ==
- Anderson, James (2003). Memorable Women of the Puritan Times. Kessinger. ISBN 0-7661-7296-1.
- "Cromwell's family". The Cromwell Association.
- Firth, C.H. (1888). "Cromwell, Oliver (1599-1658)" . In Stephen, Leslie (ed.). Dictionary of National Biography. Vol. 13. London: Smith, Elder & Co. p. 155–180.
- Fraser, Antonia (1989). Love Letters, An Illustrated Anthology. Contemporary Books. ISBN 0-8092-4314-8.
- Jesse, John Heneage (1846). Memoirs of the court of England, from the revolution in 1688 to the death of George the Second. Vol. 3 (Second ed.). R. Bentley. pp. 142–151.
- Noble, Mark (1784a). Memoirs of the protectorate-house of Cromwell: deduced from an early period, and continued down to the present time: ... Vol. 1. Birmingham: printed by Pearson and Rollason, sold by R. Baldwin [and 3 others]. p. 151–163.
- Noble, Mark (1784b). Memoirs of the protectorate-house of Cromwell: deduced from an early period, and continued down to the present time: ... Vol. 2. London: Pearson and Rollason, sold by R. Baldwin. p. iv (Index).
- Gaunt, Peter (January 2008) [September 2004]. "Cromwell [Bourchier], Elizabeth (1598–1665)". Oxford Dictionary of National Biography (online ed.). Oxford University Press. doi:10.1093/ref:odnb/65778. (Subscription, Wikipedia Library access or UK public library membership required.)
- Plant, David (17 October 2012). "Biography of Oliver Cromwell". BCW Project.
- Rogers, Pat (1980). Hacks and dunces: Pope, Swift and Grub Street. Taylor & Francis. p. 32. ISBN 978-0-416-74240-4.

Attribution:
