= Elizabeth Claypole =

Daughter of Oliver Cromwell (1629-1658)

Elizabeth, Lady Claypole
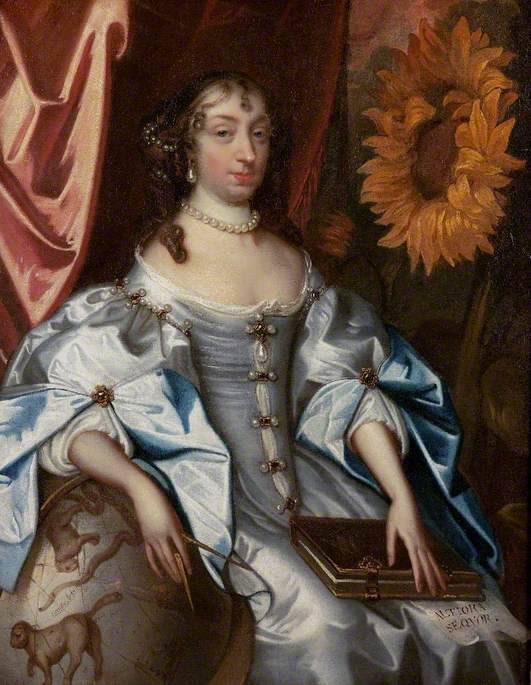
- by Jacob Huysmans
- Born: Elizabeth Cromwell; 2 July 1629
- Died: 6 August 1658 (aged 29)
- Resting place: Westminster Abbey
- Spouse: John Claypole
- Children: 4
- Parent(s): Oliver Cromwell; Elizabeth Bourchier
- Relatives: Cromwell family

Elizabeth Claypole (Note: also Cleypole and Claypoole (Noble and Firth DNB)) (née Cromwell; 2 July 1629 – 6 August 1658) was the second daughter of Oliver Cromwell, Lord Protector of the Commonwealth of England, Scotland and Ireland, and his wife, Elizabeth Cromwell, and reportedly interceded with her father for royalist prisoners. After Cromwell created a peerage for her husband, John Claypole, she was known as Lady Claypole. She was buried in Westminster Abbey.

== Biography ==
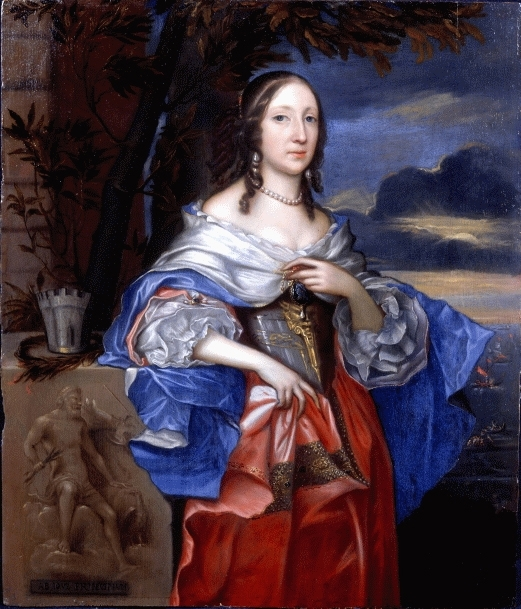
Elizabeth Claypole, by John Michael Wright

Her marriage to John Claypole took place on 13 January 1646. She was the favourite daughter of her father, to whom her spiritual condition seems to have caused some anxiety. On one occasion he writes to his daughter, Bridget, expressing his satisfaction that her sister (i.e. Claypole) "sees her own vanity and carnal mind, bewailing it, and seeks after what will satisfy". But four years later he bade her mother warn her to "take heed of a departing heart and of being cozened with worldly vanities and worldly company, which I doubt she is too subject to".

Some of her contemporaries felt she was too much exalted by her father's sovereignty. Lucy Hutchinson, a biographer and scholar who married one of the regicides, termed Claypole and all her sisters (excepting Bridget Fleetwood) "insolent fools." Captain Titus wrote to Hyde relating a remark of Elizabeth Claypole's at a wedding feast concerning the wives of the major-generals:

The feast wanting much of its grace by the absence of those ladies, it was asked by one there where they were. Mrs. Claypole answered, "I'll warrant you washing their dishes at home as they use to do." This hath been extremely ill taken, and now the women do all they can with their husbands to hinder Mrs. Claypole from being a princess.

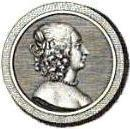
Elizabeth Claypole

But according to the account of James Harrington, "she acted the part of a princess very naturally, obliging all persons with her civility, and frequently interceding for the unhappy." It was to her he applied with success for the restoration of the confiscated manuscript of his Oceana.

According to Ludlow and Heath, Claypole interceded for the life of Dr. John Hewett, but her own letter on the discovery of the plot in which he had been engaged throws a doubt on this story. Still she is said to have habitually interceded with her father for political offenders. Ludlow reported that her failure in this pleading may have contributed to her death, which happened soon after with the concurrence of an ulcer in her womb. "How many of the royalist prisoners got she not freed? How many did not she save from death whom the laws had condemned?"

She was taken ill in June 1658, and her sickness was aggravated by the death of her youngest son, Oliver. The nature of her disease is variously stated: "The truth is," writes Fleetwood, "it's believed the physicians do not understand thoroughly her case". Clarendon, Heath, Bates, and other royalist writers represent her as upbraiding her father in her last moments for the blood he had shed. The first hint of this report occurs in a newsletter of 16 September, where it is said that the Lady Claypole "did on her deathbed beseech his highness to take away the high court of justice".

She died on 6 August 1658, and the Mercurius Politicus in announcing her death describes her as "a lady of an excellent spirit and judgment, and of a most noble disposition, eminent in all princely qualities conjoined with sincere resentments of true religion and piety." She was buried on 10 August in Henry VII's chapel in Westminster Abbey. After the Restoration, Firth states in the Dictionary of National Biography that her body was exhumed, along with about twenty others, and placed into a pit in a graveyard near the back door of the prebendary's lodgings. However, in 1869 Dean Stanley conducted a search for the remains of James I, in the course of which he found the coffin of Lady Claypole, in the vault nearest to the dais west of Henry VII's tomb, with her name engraved on a silver coffin-plate. Peter Gaunt states in the Oxford Dictionary of National Biography that Claypole's body was allowed to remain in the Abbey.

Of her four children, three sons and a daughter, Cromwell Claypole died in May 1678 unmarried; Henry is reported to have predeceased his brother; Oliver died in June 1658; and Martha died in January 1664. None left any descendants.

== Influences ==
She inspired the figure of Delmira, in the Italian tragedy of 1671 Il Cromuele (The Cromwell) written by Girolamo Graziani, set in England during the Civil War. (Note: Delmira is a loyalist friend of Queen Henrietta Maria, wife of Charles I, executed by the will of Cromwell and then by an Anagnorisis discovered to be his daughter.)

== Ancestry ==
Ancestors of Elizabeth Claypole

16. Sir Richard Williams
8. Sir Henry Cromwell
17. Frances Murfyn
4. Robert Cromwell
18. Sir Ralph Warren
9. Joan Warren
19. Joan Lake
2. Oliver Cromwell, 1st Lord Protector
10. William Steward
5. Elizabeth Steward
22. Thomas Paine
11. Catherine Paine
1. Elizabeth Cromwell, Lady Claypole
24. Richard Bourchier
12. Thomas Bourchier
6. Sir James Bourchier
26. James Morley
13. Elizabeth Morley
3. Elizabeth Bourchier
14. Thomas Crane
7. Frances Crane

== Notes ==
Footnotes

Citations
