= Ireton (surname) =

Ireton is a surname. Notable people with the surname include:

- Albert Ireton (1879–1947), British athlete
- Bridget Ireton (1650–1726), daughter of Henry Ireton
- Catherine Ireton, Irish pop singer and member of God Help the Girl and The Go Away Birds
- John Ireton (1615–1689), English politician
- Henry Ireton (1611–1651), English general associated with the English Civil War
- Henry Ireton (died 1711), English army officer and politician
- Peter Leo Ireton, an American Catholic bishop
