= William Fisk =

William Fisk may refer to:

- William Fisk (painter) (1796–1872), English painter
- William J. Fisk (1833–1909), American politician
- William Fisk (politician) (1871–1940), Australian politician
- William Henry Fisk (1827–1884), English painter and drawing-master
- Bill Fisk (1916–2007), American football player and coach
- William Fisk, a character in the 1956 film The Ambassador's Daughter

== See also ==
- William Fiske (disambiguation)
- Willbur Fisk (1792–1839), American Methodist minister, educator and theologian
