= The Roundheads or, The Good Old Cause =

The Roundheads or, The Good Old Cause, is a comedic play written by Aphra Behn, first performed in 1681 and published in 1682. An adaptation of John Tatum's 1660 Tory farce The Rump, it is set shortly before the Restoration of the Monarchy.

== Plot ==
The play follows important members of the Committee of Safety (a Puritan body that governed England in 1659 before the restoration of Charles II), who Behn portrays as variously inept, greedy or lecherous. Two of the most conniving members, Lord Lambert and Lord Fleetwood, plot against each other to seize the crown.

Behn also has two romantic subplots, each involving an unhappily married aristocratic woman and a dashing Cavalier. Lady Lambert (Lambert's wife and the former mistress of Oliver Cromwell. whose widow confronts her in an early scene) is initially a Roundhead but embraces the Royalist cause after falling in love with Loveless. The second woman, Lady Desbro, is a secret Royalist who loves John Freeman.

At the end of the play, the King's forces conquer the City of London. Lambert is imprisoned in the Tower of London and Lady Desbro's older husband dies of fright, freeing both women to reunite with their lovers.

== Reception ==
Critics have often interpreted The Roundheads as 'straightforward Tory romp', but some scholars suggest that Behn's portrayal of the warring political factions is more nuanced than it first seems. Melissa Mowry notes that Behn sometimes "allows characters associated with republicanism more dignity than we might expect, or at least fails to condemn them as stridently as a royalist might". For example, Behn portrayed Elizabeth Cromwell far more sympathetically than John Tatum had in his earlier play. Kimberley Latta argues that Behn's version of Cromwell's widow "stands as a rational, intellectually autonomous woman speaking the truth about current affairs in an effort to bring the world in tune with her own understanding of providence".
