= Bridget Cromwell =

Oliver Cromwell's daughter

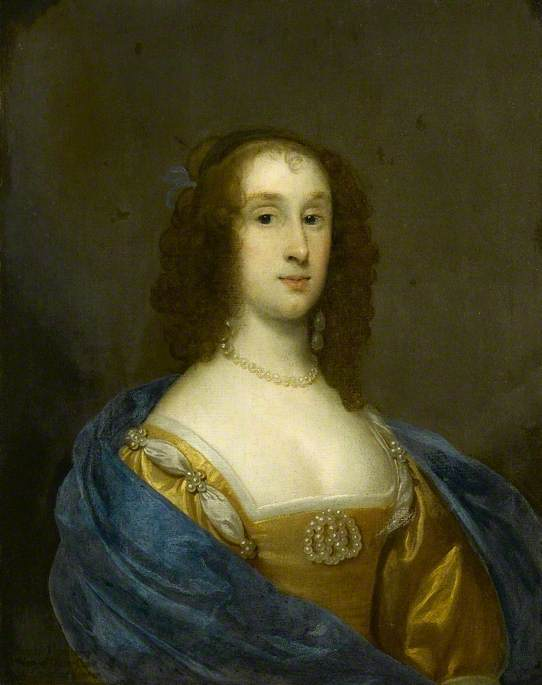
- by Cornelius Johnson
- Baptised: 5 August 1624
- Died: June 1662 (aged 37)
- Spouse(s): Henry Ireton; Charles Fleetwood
- Children: 7, including Henry and Bridget
- Parent(s): Oliver Cromwell; Elizabeth Bourchier
- Relatives: Cromwell family

Bridget Cromwell (1624 – June 1662) was Oliver Cromwell's eldest daughter. She married General Henry Ireton and after he died, General Charles Fleetwood.

== Life ==
She was born to Elizabeth (born Bouchier) and Oliver Cromwell in 1624. Cromwell comes to notice in 1646 when she marries Henry Ireton who was a close colleague of her father. Her portrait was painted by Cornelius Johnson and that picture is now in Chequers Court.

In 1651 they went to Ireland where Henry encouraged the Parliamentarian cause. Bridget did not stay long and she was in England when the news of her husband's death reached her. He had died on 26 November 1651 at Limerick.

In 1652 she married another friend of her father, General Charles Fleetwood. Like her first husband, he was sent to Ireland to lead the army. This time Bridget went to Ireland for much longer and staying from 1652 to 1655. After the Restoration, she lived in London. Her husband was prevented from further leadership and she had to withstand the exhumation of her and Fleetwood's infant child from Westminster Abbey where the child had been buried. Her first husband was not only exhumed but his dead body was hanged in revenge for Henry's involvement in the regicide of Charles I.

== Death and legacy ==
She died in June 1662 and she was survived by at least seven children. At least three of them had Fleetwood as a father and the rest were the children of Ireton. She was buried in St Anne's Church in Blackfriars, London. One of her daughters was Bridget Bendish.

She features in an image in the National Portrait Gallery where she is shown in the foreground when her family were imagined to be pleading with Oliver Cromwell to spare the life of Charles I. The original was by William Fisk and James Scott creating the engraving in 1839.
