= Ireton =

Ireton may refer to:

== Places ==
- Ireton, Alberta, a locality in Leduc County
- Ireton, England, a hamlet near Idridgehay in Derbyshire
- Ireton, Iowa
- Ireton, Nova Scotia
- Kirk Ireton, an English village

== Other uses ==
- Ireton (surname)
- Ireton Formation, a sub-unit of the Woodbend Group stratigraphical unit
