= Il Conquisto di Granata =

1650 epic poem by Girolamo Graziani

Il Conquisto Di Granata
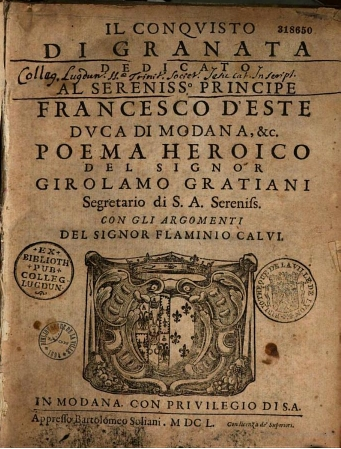
- Il Conquisto di Granata - Girolamo Graziani (1650)
- Author: Girolamo Graziani
- Original title: "Il Conquisto Di Granata" Poema Heroico del signor Girolamo Gratiani
- Language: Italian
- Genre: epic poem
- Publisher: Soliani (Italy)
- Publication date: 1650
- Publication place: Italy
- Pages: 614
- Preceded by: Lo Specchio della Gloria, Modena, Cassiani, 1648
- Followed by: La Gara delle Stagioni, Modena, Cassiani, 1652

il Conquisto di Granata (The conquest of Granada) is an epic poem in 26 cantos by the Italian poet Girolamo Graziani first published in Modena in 1650. The poem tells the last year of the siege of Granada (Granada War) led by Ferdinand II of Aragon (Ferdinand The Catholic) with which ended the reconquista of the Muslim-controlled areas of the Iberian Peninsula broadly known as Al-Andalus. The poem has a digression which depicts Christopher Columbus' discovery of the New World.

== Curiosity ==
In its observance of Aristotelian rules and its religious and moral orthodoxy, the poem recalls Torquato Tasso's Jerusalem Delivered, although more space is given to love themes and to adventurous digressions, such as that on Columbus' discovery of the New World. The plot (love in the imminence of death) and the names of the main characters (Consalvo and Elvira) has been the source for Giacomo Leopardi's Consalvo (1833). The poem was ranked by Quadrio "among the best epical productions of the age." A German translation of the Conquisto was published in Nuremberg in 1834.

== Editions ==
- Modena, Soliani, 1650 in -4°
- Napoli, Molo [Roberto Mollo?], 1651 in -12°
- Parigi, chez le Sieur des Rotieurs, 1654, 2 Tomi, in -12° (with French preface)
- Milano, Filippo Ghisolfi, 1666
- Bologna, Manolessi, 1670 in -24°
- Venezia, Combi e la Noù, 1684 in -12°
- Venezia, Zatta, 1768
- Colle Pacini, Eusebio, 1816, 2 Voll. in -12°
- In: Il Parnaso Italiano edited by A.Peretti e A.Cappelli, Antonelli, Venezia, 1832-1851, Volume II, pages XII+328

== Bibliography ==
- Antonio Peretti e A. Cappelli, Prefazione al «Conquisto di Granata», in: Il Parnaso Italiano, 2 vol., Venezia, Antonelli, 1832–51, vol. 2, pagg. I-XII.
- Belloni, Antonio (1893). Gli Epigoni della «Gerusalemme Liberata». Padua: Angelo Draghi. pp. 320–43.
- Antonio Belloni, Di una probabile fonte del «Consalvo» di Giacomo Leopardi, Milano, Albighi-Segati, 1903, pages 261-8.
- Di Nepi, Piero (1976). "Il «Conquisto di Granata» e l'epica del Seicento". Il Veltro. XX (1/2): 94–104.
- Maragoni, Gian Piero (1989). L'onda e la spira. Saggio di ricerca sull'artificio anacronico nel "Conquisto di Granada" di Girolamo Graziani. Rome: Bulzoni.
