= Katherine Philips =

Anglo-Welsh poet and translator (1631/32 – 1664)

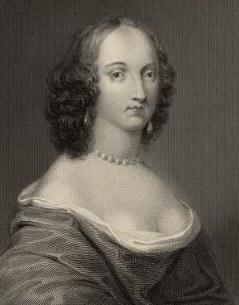
- Born: Katherine Fowler; 1 January 1632; London, England
- Died: 22 June 1664 (aged 32); London, England
- Resting place: St Benet Sherehog
- Occupations: Poet; playwright; translator
- Spouse: James Philipps (m. 1648; died 1664)
- Writing career
- Pen name: Orinda
- Language: English
- Movement: Cavalier poetry

Katherine or Catherine Philips (née Fowler; 1 January 1631/2 – 22 June 1664), also known as "The Matchless Orinda", was an Anglo-Welsh royalist poet, translator, and woman of letters. She achieved renown as a translator of Pierre Corneille's Pompée and Horace, and for her editions of poetry after her death. She was highly regarded by many notable later writers, including John Dryden and John Keats, as being influential.

== Early years ==
Born in London, Katherine was the daughter of John Fowler, a Presbyterian cloth merchant of Bucklersbury, near the river in the City of London, and of Katherine Oxenbridge, whose father worked in the medical profession. Katherine, it seems, had a strong memory and was intellectually advanced, and was, according to a cousin of hers, able to read the Bible before the age of four. Additionally, she acquired remarkable fluency in several languages. After her father's death, she moved to Wales with her newly married mother. She attended boarding school from 1640 to 1645 where she began to write verse within a circle of friends and to appreciate French romances and Cavalier plays from which she would later choose many of the pet names she gave to members of her Society of Friendship. This school, run by a Mrs Salmon, was in Hackney, a hotbed of female education at the time.

Philips also broke with Presbyterian traditions, in both religion and politics, by becoming a member of the Church of England, as well as an ardent admirer of the king and his policy.

In 1648, when she was sixteen, Katherine Fowler married Welsh Parliamentarian James Philipps. James Philipps' age has been the subject of some dispute, as he was long thought to be 54 years old on their wedding day, thus making him 38 years Katherine's senior. However, it seems their recovered marriage certificate has since shown that James Philipps was actually only 24 years old at the time of their union. The couple had two children, including a son named Hector who did not live past infancy. He was buried in London in 1655. Hector's death was the subject of some of her later poems, such as "Epitaph on Her Son H. P. At St. Syth's Church" and "On the Death of my First and Dearest Childe".

== Life and career ==
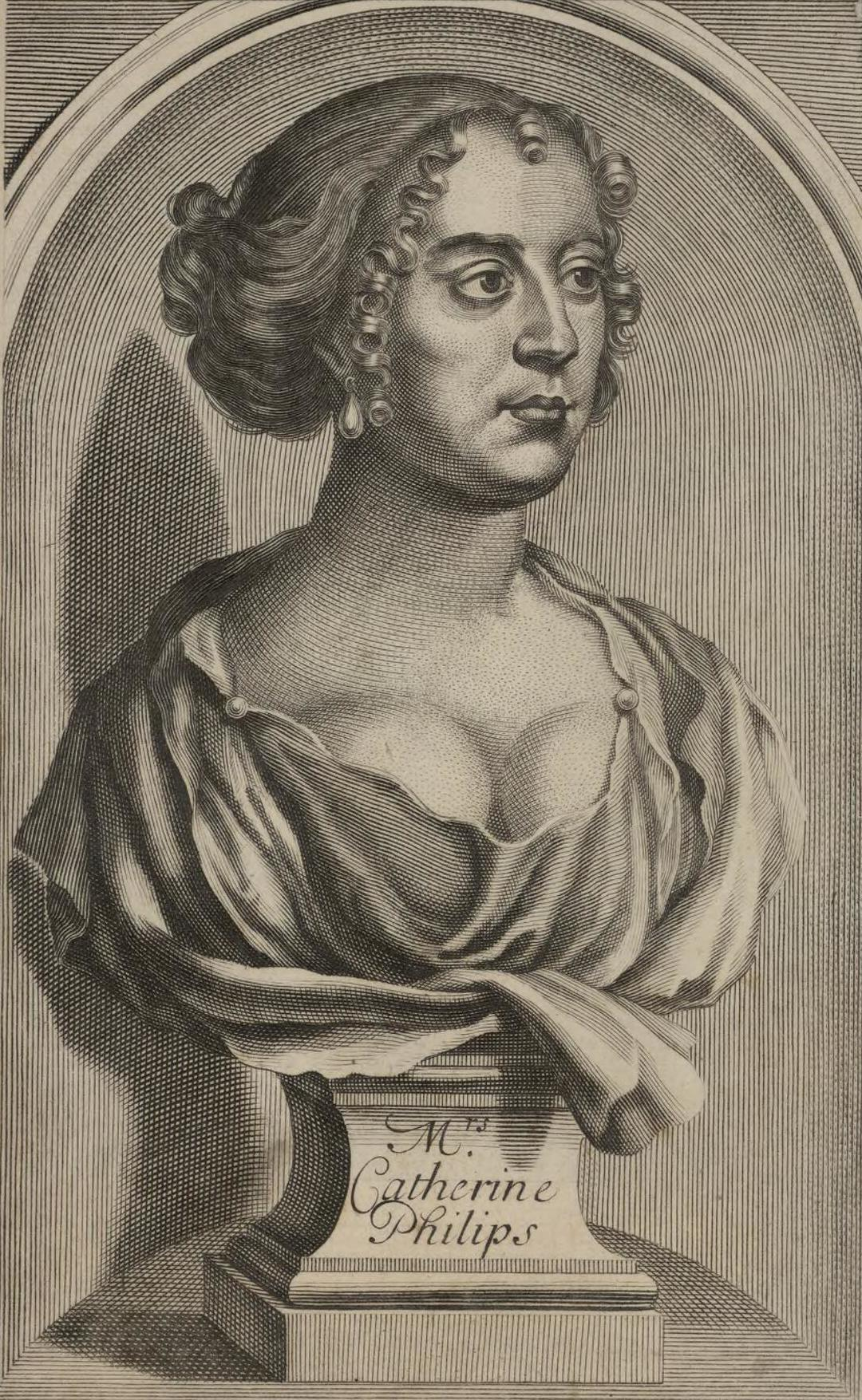
Engraving of a bust of Katherine Philips

The Society of Friendship had its origins in the cult of Neoplatonic love imported from the continent in the 1630s by Charles I's French wife, Henrietta Maria. Members adopted pseudonyms drawn from French pastoral romances of Cavalier dramas. Philips dramatised in her Society of Friendship the ideals, as well as the realities and tribulations, of Platonic love. Thus the Society helped establish a literary standard for her generation and Orinda herself as a model for the female writers who followed her. Her home at the Priory, Cardigan, Wales became the centre of the Society of Friendship, the members of which were known to one another by pastoral names: Philips was "Orinda", her husband "Antenor", and Sir Charles Cotterel "Poliarchus". "The Matchless Orinda", as her admirers called her, was regarded as the apostle of female friendship and inspired great respect. She was widely considered an exemplar of the ideal woman writer: virtuous, proper, and chaste. She was frequently contrasted to the more daring Aphra Behn, to the latter's detriment. Her poems, frequently occasional, typically celebrate the refined pleasures of platonic love. Jeremy Taylor in 1659 dedicated to her his Discourse on the Nature, Offices and Measures of Friendship, and Cowley, Henry Vaughan the Silurist, the Earl of Roscommon and the Earl of Cork and Orrery all celebrated her talent.

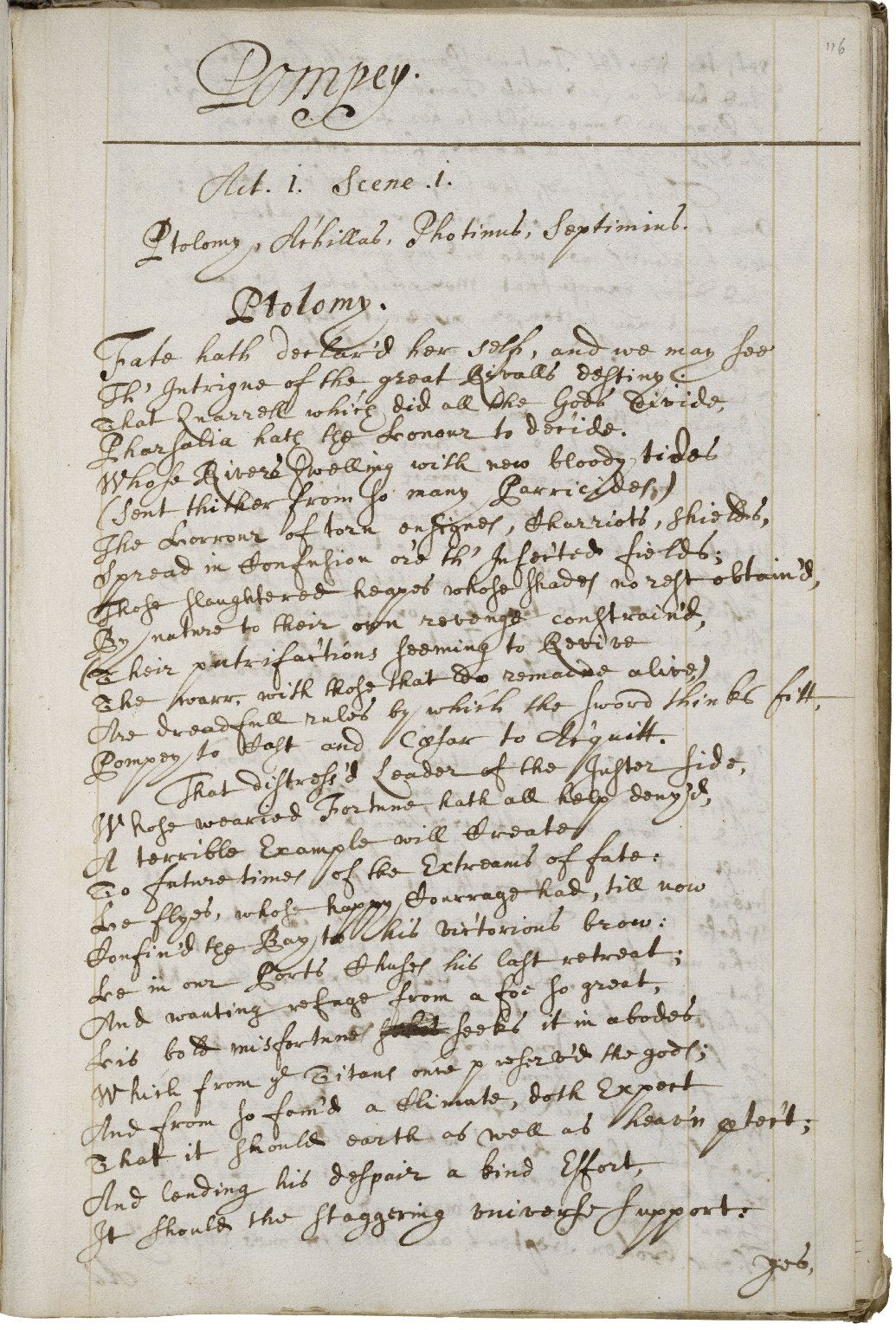
A page from a manuscript copy of Philips' poetry, c. 1670.

In 1662 she went to Dublin to pursue her husband's claim to certain Irish estates, which, due to her late father's past monetary investments in the British military, they were in danger of losing. There she completed a translation of Pierre Corneille's Pompée, produced with great success in 1663 in the Smock Alley Theatre, and printed in the same year both in Dublin and London, under the title Pompey. Although other women had translated or written dramas, her translation of Pompée broke new ground as the first rhymed version of a French tragedy in English and the first English play written by a woman to be performed on the professional stage. In 1664, an edition of her poetry entitled Poems by the Incomparable Mrs. K.P. was published; this was an unauthorised edition that made several grievous errors. In March 1664, Philips travelled to London with a nearly completed translation of Corneille's Horace, but died of smallpox. She was buried in the church of St Benet Sherehog, later destroyed in the Great Fire of London.

== Reception and legacy ==
After her death, in 1667 an authorised edition of her poetry was printed entitled Poems by the Most Deservedly Admired Mrs. Katherine Philips, the Matchless Orinda. The edition included her translations of Pompée and Horace.

Edward Phillips, nephew of John Milton, placed Katherine Philips high above Aphra Behn, writing in Theatrum poetarum (1675), a list of the chief poets of all ages and countries, that she was "the most applauded...Poetess of our Nation".

The literary atmosphere of her circle is preserved in the excellent Letters of Orinda to Poliarchus, published by Bernard Lintot in 1705 and 1709. Poliarchus (Sir Charles Cotterell) was master of the ceremonies at the court of the Restoration, and afterwards translated the romances of La Calprenède. Philips had two children, one of whom, Katharine, became the wife of a "Lewis Wogan" of Boulston, Pembrokeshire. According to Gosse, Philips may have been the author of a volume of Female Poems ... written by Ephelia, which are in the style of Orinda, though other scholars have not embraced this attribution.

Philips's translations and poems consider questions of political authority and express her royalist beliefs. Her work also considers the nature and value of friendship between women. There has been speculation over whether her work could be described as lesbian. Certainly her representations of female friendship are intense, even passionate. She herself always insisted on their platonic nature and characterises her relationships as the "meeting of souls," as in these lines from "To my Excellent Lucasia, on our Friendship":

For as a watch by art is wound
To motion, such was mine;
But never had Orinda found
A soul till she found thine;

Which now inspires, cures, and supplies,
And guides my darkened breast;
For thou art all that I can prize,
My joy, my life, my rest. (9–16)

Harriette Andreadis has argued that 'her manipulations of the conventions of male poetic discourse constitute a form of lesbian writing.' However, there are many critics who do not believe Philips's poetry is indicative of her sexuality. For example, in discussing "To the Excellent Lucasia" Mark Llewellyn argues that the image portrayed by the speaker is "stripped of all sensual appetite, could become the pathway to apprehension of, and eventually mystic union with, divine love and beauty" (447). Andreadis says, "friendship here is no less than the mingling of souls, the intimacy of hearts joined in secret and holding each other's secrets, sublimely elevating the friends to such ecstasies that they pity the mundane pleasures and powers of worldly rulers" (529).

Upon the Double Murder of King Charles is a more politically minded piece than many of her others from this time period, although she is often associated with a class of poets termed Royalist or Cavalier poets, noting their political sympathy to the Royalist cause, those who supported the monarchy of King Charles I of England during the English Civil War and the following English Interregnum.

== Influences ==
She inspired the figure of "Orinda", elderly widow, hypersensitive to matters of love, and she herself a victim of love for a woman, in the Italian tragedy of 1671 Il Cromuele (Cromwell) written by Girolamo Graziani, set in England during the Civil War.

== Premiere of Pompey ==
On 10 February 1663 Philips' adaptation of the French verse tragedy, Pierre Corneille's, Pompée was premièred at Smock Alley. The opening night was notable for its political undertones, as well as having the Lord Lieutenant of Ireland in the audience. It also had theatre goers of all classes in attendance. Some Catholic, loyal to the monarchy after the war and desiring to acquire their lands back for their families. Others in the audience were Protestant and felt entitled to these same lands based on the promises made to them. Due to Ireland's tense political climate, the theatre was a welcomed escape from these politically complicated Catholic/Protestant relations, following the English Civil War and the Cromwellian conquest of Ireland. The play opened with a direct heroic couplet suggesting the idea of two rivals finding a successful compromise:

The mighty Rivals, whose destructive Rage
Did the whole World in Civil Arms engage,
Are now agreed, and make it both their Choice,
To have their Fates determin'd by your Voice.

The original speaker on opening night failed to mention specific details to the play which are in the script in this opening, allowing the audience to assume the text could be directed at the current political affairs. There are rumours that Philips was either in the audience or could have even been an actress in the play herself.

== Sexuality ==
There has been speculation among critics over Katherine Philips' sexuality, specifically regarding the relationships she shared with some of her female friends. Literary critics have often highlighted suggestions of female intimacy and eroticism within Philips' work. In fact, many of her poems were written for or about fellow Society of Friendship members Anne Owen and Mary Aubrey, who went by the names of Lucasia and Rosania, respectively. A series of letters exchanged by Philips and her friend Sir Charles Cotterell between 6 December 1661 and 17 May 1664 were recovered and published in 1705, under the title Letters from Orinda to Poliarchus. Hints of Philips' affection for Owen can be found throughout this correspondence, notably within an exchange referring to Philips' attempt to convince Owen to marry Sir Charles in order to keep her nearby, as Owen was engaged at the time and planned to move to Dublin with one Marcus Trevor. This attempt would ultimately prove unsuccessful.
