= Upon the Double Murder of King Charles =

17th-century poem by Katherine Philips

- In Answer to a Libelous Rhyme made by V.P.
- by Katherine Philips
- Written: 17th century
- Country: England
- Language: English
- Subject(s): Execution of Charles I
- Lines: 34

"Upon the Double Murder of King Charles In Answer to a Libelous Rhyme made by V.P." is a 17th-century poem by Katherine Philips.

== Historical occasion for the poem ==
Upon the Double Murder of King Charles
In Answer to a Libelous Rhyme made by V.P.

I think not on the state, nor am concerned
Which way soever that great helm is turned,
But as that son whose father's danger nigh
Did force his native dumbness, and untie
His fettered organs: so here is a cause
That will excuse the breach of nature's laws.
Silence were now a sin: nay passion now
Wise men themselves for merit would allow.
What noble eye could see, (and careless pass)
The dying lion kicked by every ass?
Hath Charles so broke God's laws, he must not have
A quiet crown, nor yet a quiet grave?
Tombs have been sanctuaries; thieves lie here
Secure from all their penalty and fear.
Great Charles his double misery was this,
Unfaithful friends, ignoble enemies;
Had any heathen been this prince's foe,
He would have wept to see him injured so.
His title was his crime, they'd reason good
To quarrel at the right they had withstood.
He broke God's laws, and therefor he must die,
And what shall then become of thee and I?
Slander must follow treason; but yet stay,
Take not our reason with our king away.
Though you have seized upon all our defense,
Yet do not sequester our common sense.
But I admire not at this new supply:
No bounds will hold those who at scepters fly.
Christ will be King, but I ne'er understood,
His subjects built his kingdom up with blood
(Except their own) or that he would dispense
With his commands, though for his own defense.
Oh! to what height of horror are they come
Who dare pull down a crown, tear up a tomb!

This piece was written by Katherine Philips reportedly in response to "a Libelous Rhyme made by V.P." The "V.P." in question is Vavasor Powell (1617–70), a Noncomformist preacher, member of the Fifth Monarchists, and a writer. The "rhyme" alluded to by Philips is his poem "Of The Late K. Charles of Blessed Memory".

The historical moment which spurred the creation of this piece was the regicide of King Charles I of England in 1649 and the reaction of the populace to his death, specifically the disrespect offered his body and memory by the Parliamentarians.

== Katherine Philips' political situation ==
Katherine Philips is often associated with a class of poets termed Royalist or Cavalier denoting their political sympathy to the Royalist cause, those who supported the monarchy of King Charles I of England during the English Civil War and the following English Interregnum.

However, while Philips is often classified among these writers, throughout the English Civil War and the English Interregnum she generally kept a relatively neutral political tone in her writings. This is a result of her close relationships with both Royalists and Parliamentarians. On one hand, she was very close to her "Society of Friendship," a very tight knit group of Philips' friends which was composed of almost exclusively Royalist writers. However, her husband James Philips, was a prominent Parliamentarian. Following the Restoration in 1660, Philips turned more towards Royalist writing in hopes of improving her husband's political status.

"Upon the Double Murder of King Charles" is a more politically minded piece than many of her others from this time period; however, her political ambivalence is manifest in it still in her opening lines which explain that, "I think not on the state, nor am concerned/Which way soever that great helm is turned," and again later when she criticizes not only the Parliamentarians, or "ignoble enemies," but also the Royalists, King Charles's "unfaithful friends." When it became apparent the poem may be published, and so embarrass her husband James Philips, Philips was forced to apologise. She did so in the form of another poem but whilst distancing herself from the views of her husband she reinforced her criticism of Powell.

== Significance ==
This poem is significant in that through it Philips is entering the realm of British politics. She was one of the first women to do so through literature. In line 6 she speaks of breaking nature's laws, which is referring to her breaking the norms of woman's silence in things political. She suggests that the Parliamentarian's rejection and overthrow of Charles I is enough to justify her in breaching "nature's laws."

In line 17 she says that the heathen would sorrow at the fall of Charles I. She is implying that the heathen is more Christian than the Puritan Parliamentarian, for the Parliamentarians showed no such sorrow or remorse, but rather slandered and libeled the fallen king.
