= La Cleopatra (poem) =

1632 epic poem by Girolamo Graziani

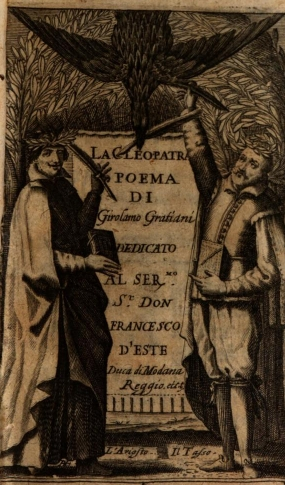
- Cover of the Epic Poem "La Cleopatra" (1632) by Girolamo Graziani
- Author: Girolamo Graziani
- Original title: 'La Cleopatra' Poema in XIII Canti
- Language: Italian
- Genre: epic poem
- Publisher: Sarzina (Italy)
- Publication date: 1632
- Publication place: Italy
- Pages: 344
- Preceded by: L'Iride, per le nozze serenissime di Maria Farnese Principessa di Parma e Francesco d'Este Duca di Modena. Canzone, Reggio, Flaminio Bartoli, 1631
- Followed by: La Calisto. Panegirico in sesta rima alle glorie di Cristina regina di Svezia, Parigi, Agostino Courbé, 1644

La Cleopatra is an 1632 epic poem in 13 songs by Girolamo Graziani (1604–1674). The work was very successful at the time and was praised by many famous writers, including Fulvio Testi.

== The Plot ==
It deals with the story of love and war of Cleopatra and Mark Antony. It is full of pathetic-sentimental scenes that drag towards the end granted with the final double suicide (Cleopatra commits suicide, after witnessing the suicide of Mark Antony).

== Curiosity ==
It contains a prophecy in which Proteus vaticinates the Este's Kinship from Augustus.

== Editions ==
- Venice, Sarzina, 1632
- Venice, 1633
- Bologna, Per Carlo Zenero, 1652
- Venice, Francesco Brogiollo, 1670

== Bibliography ==
- Camillo Marchesini, Vita del Conte Girolamo Gratiani, now in: Giulio Bertoni, Vita del Conte Girolamo Graziani scritta da Camillo Marchesini, "Studi e documenti", vol. 1, fasc. II, (sept. 1937-XV), pages 131-5.
- Girolamo Tiraboschi, Biblioteca Modenese, Modena, Soliani, 1783, tomo III, pagg. 12-22.

== Sources ==
- Tarzia, Fabio (2002). "GRAZIANI, Girolamo". Dizionario Biografico degli Italiani (in Italian). Vol. 58: Gonzales–Graziani. Rome: Institute of the Italian Encyclopaedia. ISBN 978-88-12-00032-6.
