= Samuel Say =

English dissenting minister

Samuel Say (1676–1743) was an English dissenting minister.

== Life ==
The second son of Gyles Say, an ejected minister, by his second wife, he was born in All Saints' parish, Southampton, on 23 March 1676. He was educated at schools in Southwick, Hampshire (to 1689), and Norwich (1691–2), before moving on (1692) to the London dissenting academy of Thomas Rowe. Isaac Watts was a fellow-student and became a close friend.

After acting as chaplain for three years to Thomas Scott of Lyminge, Kent, Say ministered for a short time at Andover, Hampshire, then at Great Yarmouth (from 6 July 1704), and in 1707 settled at Lowestoft, Suffolk, where he ministered for eighteen years, but was not ordained pastor. He declined in 1712 a call to the Independent congregation at Norwich. In 1725 he became co-pastor with Samuel Baxter at Ipswich.

In 1734, after hesitation, Say accepted the care of the congregation at Long Ditch (now Princes Street), Westminster, which had been without a pastor since the death of Edmund Calamy in 1732. He died on 12 April 1743, and was buried in Bunhill Fields.

== Works ==
Two years after Say's death appeared his Poems … and two Critical Essays (1745) edited by William Duncombe; it contains juvenilia and essays on rhythm. In Letters by several Eminent Persons (1772, vol. ii.), edited by John Duncombe, are two letters by Say, and a reprint of his "Character" of Bridget Bendish, which first appeared in the Gentleman's Magazine (1760, p. 423).

The Say Papers, edited in the Monthly Repository, 1809–10, by Robert Aspland, were from manuscripts then in the possession of Say's grandson, Samuel Say Toms. Among them was a petition from Sophia, widow of Alexander Selkirk.

== Family ==
Say married (1719) Sarah Hamby (d. February 1744, aged 70). Her uncle, Nathaniel Carter (1635–1722) of Great Yarmouth, married a granddaughter of Oliver Cromwell, and founded a significant dissenting trust. Say's only child, Sarah, married Isaac Toms (1709–1801), dissenting minister at Hadleigh, Suffolk.

== Notes ==
Attribution

This article incorporates text from a publication now in the public domain: Lee, Sidney, ed. (1897). "Say, Samuel". Dictionary of National Biography. Vol. 50. London: Smith, Elder & Co.
