= James Thynne (Cirencester MP) =

Member of Parliament
- In office January 1701 – November 1701 Serving with Charles Coxe
- Preceded by: Henry Ireton
- Succeeded by: William Master
- Constituency: Cirencester

Personal details
- Born: 3 February 1644 (baptised)
- Died: 15 March 1709 Buckland, Gloucestershire
- Party: Tory
- Relations: Thomas Thynne, 1st Viscount Weymouth (brother)
- Education: University of Oxford

James Thynne (1644–1709) was an English landowner and the member of Parliament for the constituency of Cirencester for the parliament of January 1701.

== Early life and education ==
Thynne was baptised on 3 February 1644, the second son of Sir Henry Frederick Thynne, 1st Baronet, of Caus Castle, Shropshire, and Kempsford, Gloucestershire, and his wife Mary, daughter of Thomas Coventry, 1st Baron Coventry of Aylesborough. He was a younger brother of Thomas Thynne, 1st Viscount Weymouth. He was educated at the University of Oxford, graduating DCL in 1677, and never married.

== Career ==
He was joint keeper of the King's library from 1677 to 1688. In 1690 was persuaded by his brother, Lord Weymouth, to contest the Parliament constituency of Gloucestershire. He initially had the backing of Henry Somerset, 1st Duke of Beaufort, the Earl of Berkeley, and much of the local clergy. Support from his Tory allies fell away as the campaign progressed, and he was defeated by two Whig candidates.

Thynne did not contest another election until January 1701, when he was returned unopposed for Cirencester on the Tory interest. In what proved to be his only parliament, sitting until its dissolution in November 1701, he is not recorded as having spoken, but was blacklisted among members who had opposed preparations for war and put his name to a Tory response to the blacklist, the Vine Tavern Queries.

== Later life and death ==
Thynne suffered from a chronic abdominal complaint, diagnosed at the time as gout in the stomach. He was unable to stand for election again, but he continued to support the Church locally, founding charity schools at Buckland and Chipping Campden, and was connected to the Society for Promoting Christian Knowledge through Lord Weymouth and through his acquaintance with Humphrey Mackworth. Mackworth persuaded him to invest in the Mine Adventurers' Company, of which Thynne became a director in 1708, and subsequently defrauded him of a substantial sum.

Thynne died on 15 March 1709 and was buried at Buckland.
