= Bridget Bendish =

Oliver Cromwell's grand daughter

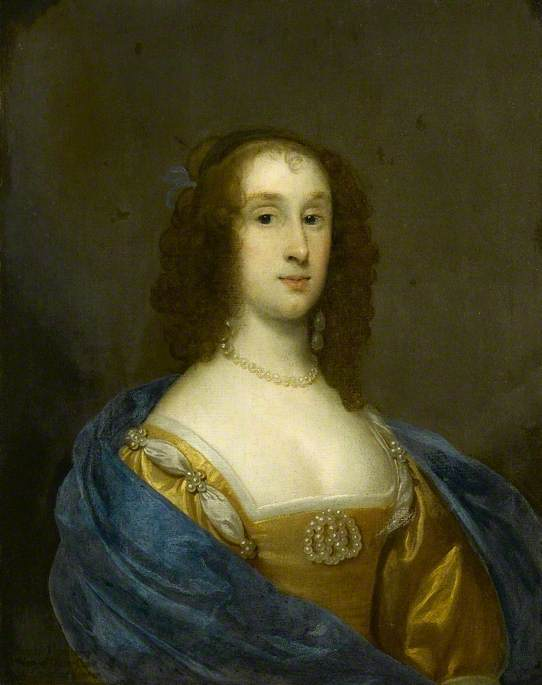
- Born: Bridget Ireton; 1650
- Died: 1726 (aged 75–76)
- Resting place: St Nicholas's Church, Great Yarmouth

Bridget Bendish (née Ireton; 1650–1726), was a daughter of General Henry Ireton and Bridget Cromwell, Oliver Cromwell's eldest daughter. She was born in Attenborough, Nottinghamshire, England. She married Thomas Bendish, a distant relative of Sir Thomas Bendish, 2nd Baronet, in 1670. Bridget died early in 1726 at age 76 and was buried in Great Yarmouth.

== Life ==
In 1652, her mother, also named Bridget Ireton (born July 1624), married General Charles Fleetwood after being widowed by the death of Henry Ireton. In 1662, her mother died; and Bridget lived with her stepfather at Stoke Newington, Middlesex, until she was 19. On 24 August 1669 a license was granted for her to marry Thomas Bendish (bap. 1645, d. 1707) of Gray's Inn; in 1670 they married. They moved to Southtown, near Great Yarmouth, where Bendish owned salt marshes and a saltworks on Cobholme. In 1672, he was charged with landing coal from the vessel of a non-burgess on the west side of the haven without permission.

Bridget Bendish always took a lively interest in politics, and is said to have compromised herself, along with her husband, in many ways in the Rye House Plot of 1683. Her views may well have been sympathetic to the Whig exclusionists. In May 1685 she aided her brother, Henry Ireton, in his escape from prison on suspicion of complicity. Following his recapture and imprisonment, she was allowed access to him in Newgate in November and December 1685. In 1688-1689 she secretly distributed papers recommending the recognition of William III.

In 1689 the clergyman Rowland Davies visited Bendish's house "and saw all his contrivance to make salt." Archbishop Tillotson introduced Bridget to Queen Mary in 1694, and a pension was promised her, but it was never granted, owing to the death of both her patrons immediately after the interview.

On 27 April 1707, her husband Thomas Bendish died, leaving her in charge of their business. Mrs. Bendish was always careless about money matters, and although she received a large bequest from her aunt, Lady Fauconberg, she had to depend for her livelihood in her old age on her own exertions.

== Family ==
Two of their sons and a daughter reached adulthood: Thomas, who died in the West Indies; Bridget, who died at Yarmouth, unmarried, in 1736, aged 64; and Henry, who died in London in 1740, having married Martha Shute, the sister of John Barrington, 1st Viscount Barrington.

== Assessment ==
She was always determined to defend her family heritage. In 1719, a local dissenting minister, Samuel Say, wrote in "The character of Mrs B[ridget] B[endish] granddaughter of Oliver Cromwell" on occasion of the closing words of Lord Clarendon's character of her grandfather that he was "a brave wicked man." This work, which was not published until after her death, portrayed her as a rigid Calvinist of uncertain temper, with a strength of will and physical courage rarely paralleled. According to Say, she labored incessantly in her own household, on her husband's farm, and at his saltworks, yet was always noted for dignity of mien and the charm of her conversation. She was reputed to bear a physical resemblance to her grandfather, of whose reputation she was an ardent champion.

Samuel Say recorded an incident when Bridget was traveling to London in a public coach when a fellow passenger, in conversation with a companion, spoke lightly of Oliver Cromwell. Bridget not only inveighed against the offender for the rest of the journey, but on landing in London snatched another passenger's sword from its sheath and challenged the slanderer to fight her there and then.

== Cited works ==
- Anderson, James. Memorable women of the Puritan times, Volume 2, Blackie and son, 1862. Chapter on "Bridget Ireton, Wife of Thomas Bendish" pp. 382–402

Attribution

This article incorporates text from a publication now in the public domain: Lee, Sidney (1885). "Bendish, Bridget". In Stephen, Leslie (ed.). Dictionary of National Biography. Vol. 4. London: Smith, Elder & Co. p. 88.
