= William Fiske =

William Fiske may refer to:

- Bill Fiske, Baron Fiske (William Geoffrey Fiske, 1905–1975), British politician
- William Fiske (1954–2008), co-creator of Quarry Hill Creative Center
- Billy Fiske (William Meade Lindsley Fiske III, 1911–1940), American Olympian and fighter pilot
- William Fiske (footballer) (1885–1918), English football goalkeeper

== See also ==
- William Fisk (disambiguation)
