= Bendish baronets =

Extinct baronetcy in the Baronetage of England

The Bendish Baronetcy, of Steeple Bumpstead in the County of Essex, was a title in the Baronetage of England. It was created on 29 June 1611 for Thomas Bendish, High Sheriff of Essex for 1618 and 1630. The second Baronet was Ambassador to the Ottoman Empire from 1647 to 1655. The title became extinct on the death of the fourth Baronet in 1717. The name is frequently spelled "Bendishe" or "Bendyshe."

Bridget Bendish was the wife of Thomas Bendish, younger son of the second Baronet.

== Bendish baronets, of Steeple Bumpstead (1611) ==
- Sir Thomas Bendish, 1st Baronet (c. 1568–1636)
- Sir Thomas Bendish, 2nd Baronet (c. 1607–c. 1674)
- Sir John Bendish, 3rd Baronet (c. 1630–1707)
- Sir Henry Bendish, 4th Baronet (c. 1674–1717)

Baronetage of England
Preceded by Mordaunt baronets	Bendish baronets 29 June 1611	Succeeded by Wynn baronets
