= Girolamo Graziani =

Italian poet and diplomat (1604–1675)

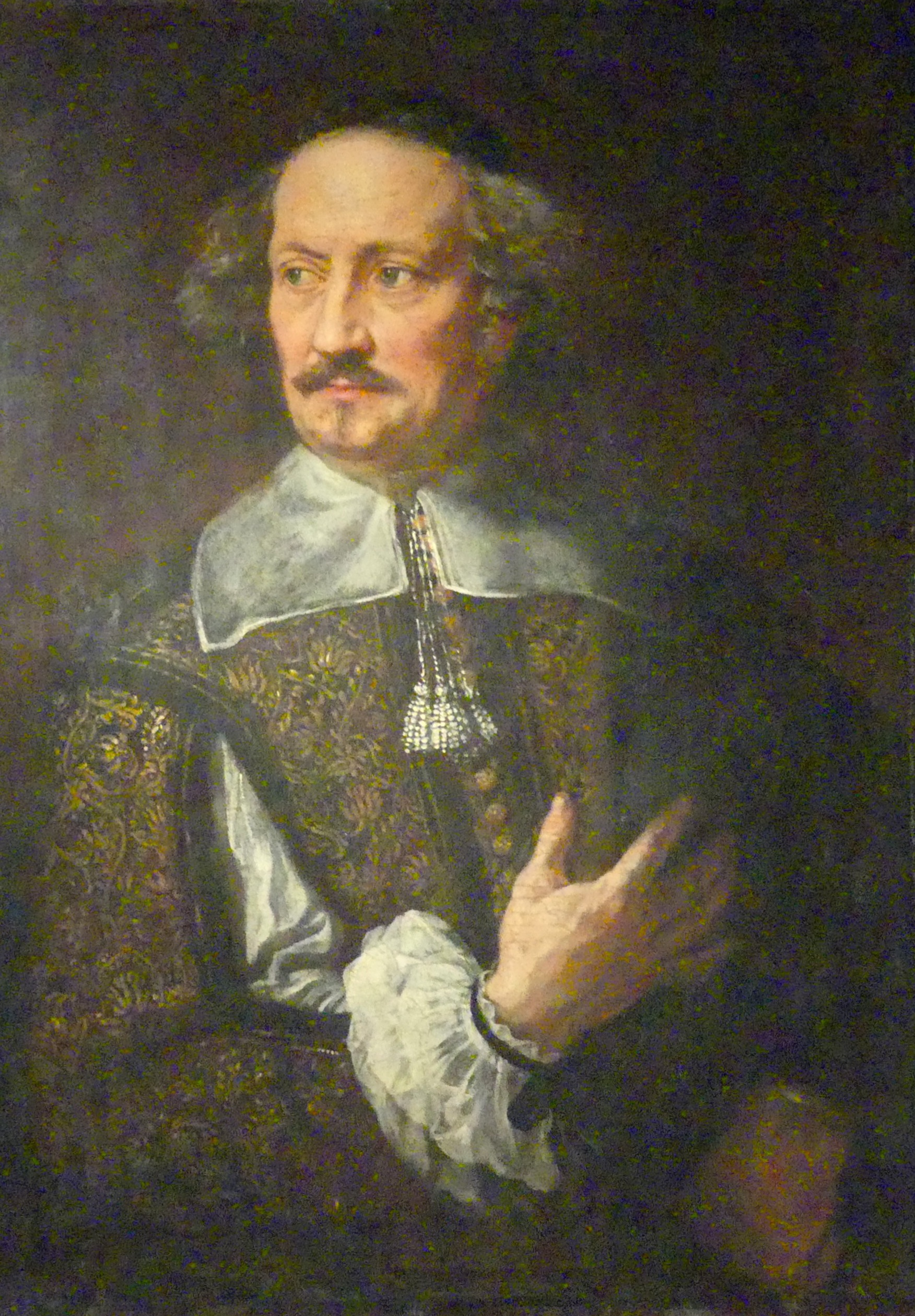
- Portrait of Girolamo Graziani by Benedetto Gennari
- Born: October 1, 1604; Pergola, Duchy of Urbino
- Died: 12 September 1675 (aged 70); Modena, Duchy of Modena and Reggio
- Resting place: Pergola, Papal States
- Education: University of Bologna
- Occupations: Diplomat; Poet; Politician; Writer
- Spouse: Lavinia Maleguzzi
- Children: 3
- Parent(s): Antonio Graziani and Lavinia Graziani
- Writing career
- Language: Italian, Latin
- Notable works: Il Cromuele; Il Conquisto di Granata; La Cleopatra

Girolamo Graziani (US: /dʒɪˈroʊləmoʊ ˌɡrɑːtsiˈɑːni/ jirr-OH-lə-moh GRAHT-see-AH-nee, Italian: [dʒiˈrɔːlamo ɡratˈtsjaːni]; 1 October 1604 – 12 September 1675) was an Italian poet and diplomat. He served as the secretary of state at the Este court of Modena. He helped establish close diplomatic ties with the court of the Kingdom of France, especially during the 1650s, when a niece of the chief minister of France Cardinal Mazarin served as the new Duchess of Modena. In 1673, Graziani handled the diplomatic aspect of the marriage between Maria Beatrice d'Este (1658–1718), and James Stuart (the future King James II of England). The marriage had been sponsored by Louis XIV of France.

Graziani was one of the most famous poets of the 17th century, but his fame didn't survive him. During his life, he was appreciated mainly for his epic poems La Cleopatra (1632) and Il Conquisto di Granata (1650).

The latter has been the source for Giacomo Leopardi's Consalvo (1833). In fact, the plot (Love in the imminence of death) and the names of the main characters (Consalvo and Elvira) of Leopardi's Consalvo seem to come from Graziani's poem.

== Biography ==
Girolamo Graziani (1604–1675) was born in Pergola, near Urbino, but he spent most of his life in Modena. His father was a law attendant in the Sacra Rota Romana. Graziani earned a degree in Arts and Law from the University of Bologna.

Graziani spent most of his life at the Este court of Modena, as State Secretary. In his diplomatic career, he helped establish close diplomatic ties with the court of France, especially as of the 1650s, when the niece of Cardinal Mazarin, Laura Martinozzi, became the new Duchess of Modena.

In 1673, during the governance of Laura Martinozzi, he managed, as Este's ambassador, the diplomatic aspect of the marriage between Laura Martinozzi's daughter, Maria Beatrice d'Este (1658–1718), and James Stuart (who will become King James II of England). The marriage had been sponsored by Louis XIV: it was reported that the French king might even provide a dowry for the occasion. In the same year, Graziani published his tragedy Il Cromuele, expressly unrespectful of Aristotle's rules. It deals with the theme of the dark, cruel tyrant (Oliver Cromwell) and the royalty profanation (Charles I of England's martyrdom).

Graziani published his first book of poetry at the age of sixteen, and was a member of the Accademia degli Incogniti of Venice and the Accademia dei Gelati of Bologna. His published works include poetry, political writings, panegyrics, laudatory and love sonnets, and two epic poems, La Cleopatra (Venice: Sarzina, 1632) and Il Conquisto di Granata, which had five editions in the seventeenth century. Il Conquisto di Granata is considered the masterpiece of seventeenth-century epic poetry and the third peak of the Italian heroic tradition, besides the Orlando Furioso and the Jerusalem Delivered.

According to some of his contemporary biographers, he also made every effort in order to publish a "Historia" about the period between the end of Castro's War and the Treaty of the Pyrenees, but the "Historia" was not published and has since been lost.

== Bibliography ==
=== Books written by Girolamo Graziani ===
- Rime di Girolamo Graziani della Pergola. Al Sereniss.Sig. e Padrone il sig.re Principe di Urbino, Parma, Anteo Viotti, 1621
- L'Iride, per le nozze serenissime di Maria Farnese Principessa di Parma e Francesco d'Este Duca di Modena. Canzone, Reggio, Flaminio Bartoli, 1631 in−4°
- La Cleopatra. Poema in XIII Canti, Venezia, Sarzina, 1632 in−24°. Next editions: Venezia, 1633 in−12°; Bologna, Per Carlo Zenero, 1652 in−12° e in−24°; Venezia, Francesco Brogiollo, 1670 in−12°.
- La Calisto. Panegirico in sesta rima alle glorie di Cristina regina di Svezia, Parigi, Agostino Courbé, 1644 in−4° Next editions: Modena, Soliani, 1656 in−4°
- Nelle Nozze di Margherita d'Este e di Fernando Gonzaga Duchi di Guastalla. Canzone, Modena, Soliani, 1647 in−4°
- Lettera che mostra le ragioni per le quali il Sig. Duca di Modena fu costretto al partito Francese. Scritta dal Conte Graziani, Segretario e Consigliere di Stato di S.A.S. ad un prelato e Ministro Principalissimo, di Modana, 13 settembre 1647, in: Vittorio Siri (ed.) Il Mercurio, Casale-Crone-Parigi-Firenze, s.s., 1642–1682, Tomo X (1648), pagg. 671-8
- Lo Specchio della Gloria nelle Nozze de i Serenissimi Principi Francesco D'Este e Vittoria Farnese Duchi di Modana.Epitalamio del Sig. Girolamo Gratiani Segre-tario di S.A. Serenissima. Sestine, Modena, Cassiani, 1648 in 4°
- Il Conquisto di Granata. Poema in XXVI Canti cogli argomenti di Flaminio Calvi, Modena, Soliani, 1650 in−4°. Next editions: Napoli, Molo [Roberto Mollo?], 1651 in−12°; Parigi, chez le Sieur des Rotieurs, 1654, 2 Tomi, in −12° [with French Prefaction], Milano, Filippo Ghisolfi, 1666 [We due the information about this edition to the Indice de' libri appartenuti alla Contessa Graziani Baglioni, ms. cart. del XV-III sec. at the Biblioteca Estense Universitaria of Modena, coll: d-K-3,20]; Bologna, Manolessi, 1670 in−24°; Venezia, Combi e la Noù, 1684 in−12°; Venezia, Zatta, 1768; Colle Pacini, Eusebio, 1816, 2 Voll. in−12°; also in: Il Parnaso Italiano care of A.Peretti e A.Cappelli, Antonelli, Venezia, 1832–1851, Volume II, pagg. XII+328
- La Gara delle Stagioni. Torneo a cavallo, rappresentato in Modena nel passaggio de' Sereniss. Arciduchi Ferdinando Carlo, Sigismondo Francesco d'Austria, ed Arciduchessa Anna di Toscana, Modena, Cassiani, 1652 in−4°
- Il Colosso Sacro. Alle Glorie del Card. Mazzarino. Panegirico in Sesta Rima, Parigi, Stamperia reale, 1655 in-folio
- Breve e sincerissima informazione di quanto è sucesso negli emergenti ultimamente occorsi per l'invasione seguita delle Armi Spagnuole ne' Stati del Duca di Modena, Modena, Cassiani, 1655 in−8°
- Apologia dell'Informazione pubblicata dal Segretario del Duca di Modena dopo la ritirata dell'Armi Spagnuole dall'invasione de' Stati di S.A.S.. Opera curiosa ed elegante di un Cittadino Modenese. E per maggiore comodità e soddisfazione de' lettori si è qui inserita l'informazione suddetta., s.l. [Modena], s.s. [Cassiani?], 1655 in-folio
- Il Trionfo della Virtù. Festa d'Armi a Cavallo rappresentata nella nascita del Serenissimo Principe di Modena, Modena, Soliani, 1660 in−12°
- Varie Poesie e Prose, Modena, Soliani, 1662, in−12°
- L'Ercole Gallico. Alle Glorie della Sacratissima Maestà del re Cristianissim. Luigi XIV. Panegirico in Sesta Rima, Modena, Soliani, 1666 in−4°
- Il Cromuele. Tragedia, Bologna, Manolessi, 1671 in−4° Next editions: Modena, Soliani, 1671 in−12°; Bologna, Manolessi, 1673 in −4°; s.l. [Piacenza], Infidi Lumi Edizioni, 1997 (Not for sale, published for the representation). care of Stefano Tomassini; Pisa, Edizioni della Normale, 2011, care of Maurizio Fasce with the collaboration of Carlo Alberto Girotto, in: Storie Inglesi, l'Inghilterra vista dall'Italia tra storia e romanzo (XVIII sec.), con l'edizione del Cappuccino scozzese di G.B. Rinuccini (1644) e del Cromuele di G.Graziani (1671), edited by Clizia Carminati and Stefano Villani, pagg. 297 – 470.
- Applauso profetico alle Glorie del re Cristianissimo Luigi XIV. panegirico in Sesta Rima, Modena, Soliani, 1673 in−4°

=== Other sonnets ===
- "In van con mille Navi alla ruina" in: Applausi della Liguria, Genova, Giuseppe Pavoni, 1638, pagg. 115-6.
- "Sospendete pur voi Globi lucenti" in: Corone di Fiori Poetici, Reggio, Vendrotti, 1674, pag.13.
- "Vidi le mura auguste e i calli alteri" e "Mario, campo di guerra è nostra vita" in: Parnaso modenese, a c. di A.Peretti e A.Cappelli, Modena, Vincenzini & Rossi, 1866, pagg. 199–200.

=== Main articles and books about Girolamo Graziani ===
- Gianfranco Loredano, Le Glorie degli Incogniti, Venezia, Valvarese, 1647, pag. 272.
- Lorenzo Crasso, Degli Elogi degli Huomini Letterati, Venezia, per Combi e la Noù, 1666, pagg. 324-7.
- Camillo Marchesini, Vita del Conte Girolamo Gratiani, lost. It was composed between 1675 and il 1695; [a hand copy in Biblioteca Estense Universitaria of Modena [coll: Cod. Ital. DCCCXL] Now in: Giulio Bertoni, Vita del Conte Girolamo Graziani scritta da Camillo Marchesini, "Studi e documenti", vol. 1, fasc. II, (set. 1937-XV), pagg. 131-5 (it's the Section of Modena of the 'Regia Deputazione di Storia Patria per l'Emilia e la Romagna').
- Giovan Mario Crescimbeni, Storia della Volgar Poesia, 6 voll., Venezia, presso Basengo, 1730² (the first edition in 7 volumes is of 1714), vol.6, pag.214.
- Egidio Giannini, Memorie Istoriche di Pergola e degli Uomini illustri di Essa, Urbino, s.s., 1732.
- Giovanni Cinelli Calvoli, Biblioteca Volante, Venezia, s.s., 1746, pagg. 72–3.
- Francesco Saverio Quadrio, Storia della Volgar Poesia, 7 voll., Milano, Francesco Angeli, 1749, vo-l.6, pag. 688.
- Ludovico Antonio Muratori, Antichità Estensi, Modena, Stamperia Ducale, 1760.
- Girolamo Tiraboschi, Biblioteca Modenese, 6 tomi, Modena, Soliani, 1783, tomo III, pagg. 12–22.
- Fil. Vecchietti e Tom. Moro, Biblioteca Picena, 2 voll., Osimo, 1790–91, pag. 145.
- Antonio Peretti e A. Cappelli, Prefazione al "Conquisto di Granata", in: Parnaso Italiano, 2 voll., Venezia, Antonelli, 1832–51, vol. 2, pagg. I-XII.
- Francesco Ilari, Biografia di Girolamo Graziani, in: Biografie e ritratti di Uomini illustri piceni, a c. di A.Hercolani, 2 voll., Forlì, Hercolani Editore, 1837, vol.1, pagg. 105–12.
- Antonio Belloni, Gli Epigoni della "Gerusalemme Liberata", Padova, Angelo Draghi, 1893, pagg. 320–43.
- Ida Malfatti, Girolamo Graziani, "la Rassegna Nazionale", vol. CXXXIII, anno XXV (sett. ott. 1903), pagg. 203–20.
- Emilio Bertana, L'irregolarità del teatro profano: il "Cromuele" di Girolamo Graziani, in: Storia dei generi letterari italiani, la Tragedia, Milano, Vallardi, s.d. [1916?], pagg. 200–10.
- Benedetto Croce, Storia dell'età barocca in Italia, in: Scritti di storia letteraria e politica, Bari, Laterza, 1924, pagg. 282–8.
- Giulio Bertoni, Gerolamo Graziani e Jean Chapelain, "Archivum Romanicum", vol. XX (1936), pagg. 505–6.
- Antonio Belloni, Di una probabile fonte del "Consalvo" di Giacomo Leopardi, Milano, Albighi-Segati, 1903, pagg. 261–8.
- Id. Il Seicento, in: Storia letteraria d'Italia, Milano, Vallardi, 1938² (la prima ed. è s.d.), pagg. 203–7.
- Luigi Amorth, Modena Capitale. Storia di Modena e de' suoi Duchi dal 1598 al 1860, Modena, Aedes Muratoria, 1961 (è il n° 1 delle Monografie di Storie Locali della Deputazione di Storia Patria e per le antiche Province Modenesi). 2ª ediz. con aggiornamenti, ivi, a cura della Banca Popolare di Modena, 1963, pagg. 125–34.
- Petre Ciureanu, Introduzione a: Jean Chapelain, Lettere inedite a corrispondenti italiani, con intr. e note di P. C., Genova, Di Stefano, 1964, pagg. LXXXV-LXXXVII e "passim".
- Claudio Varese, Teatro, Poesia e Prosa in: Storia della Letteratura Italiana a c. di E. Cecchi e N. Sapegno, Milano, Garzanti, 1967, nuova ed. acc. e aggiorn. 1988, vol.5, pagg. 878–82.
- Alberto Barbieri, Modenesi da Ricordare. Letterati, Modena, Soc.Tipografica-Editrice modenese Mucchi, 1970, pag. 67.
- Piero Di Nepi, Il "Conquisto di Granata" e l'epica del Seicento, "Il Veltro", anno XX (1976), nn. 1/2, pagg. 94–104.
- Giovanni Bertuzzi (a c. di), Modena, vicende e protagonisti, 3 voll., Bologna, Edizioni Edison, 1978, vol. 3 pag. 285.
- Piero Di Nepi, Girolamo Graziani e la politica come arte: "Cromuele", "F.M. Annali dell'Istituto di Filologia Moderna dell'Università di Roma, 2-1979, Roma, 1981, pagg. 113-24 (recensito da Fulvio Bianchi in: "La Rassegna della Letteratura italiana" diretta da Walter Binni, sett. dic. 1982, pagg. 620-1).
- Rosa Galli Pellegrini, La Tragédie Italienne à l'école du classicisme Français: le rôle de Chapelain dans la genèse du "Cromuele" de Graziani, "Quaderni del Dipartimento di Lingue e Letterature Straniere Moderne, Università di Genova", 2–1987, pp. 35–57.
- Gian Piero Maragoni, L’onda e la spira. Saggio di ricerca sull’artificio anacronico nel Coquisto di Granada di Girolamo Graziani, Bulzoni, Roma, 1989.
- Maurizio Fasce, Introduzione e note alla edizione de Il Cromuele, with the collaboration of Carlo Alberto Girotto, Storie Inglesi, l'Inghilterra vista dall'Italia tra storia e romanzo (XVIII sec.), edited by Clizia Carminati and Stefano Villani, Edizioni della Normale, Pisa, 2011, pagg. 297 – 330.
- Hester, Nathalie (2017). "Columbus Conquers the Moors: Baroque Italian Epic from Granada to the New World". The New World in Early Modern Italy. Cambridge University Press: 270–287.
