= Francesco Saverio Quadrio =

Italian scholar, historian, and writer

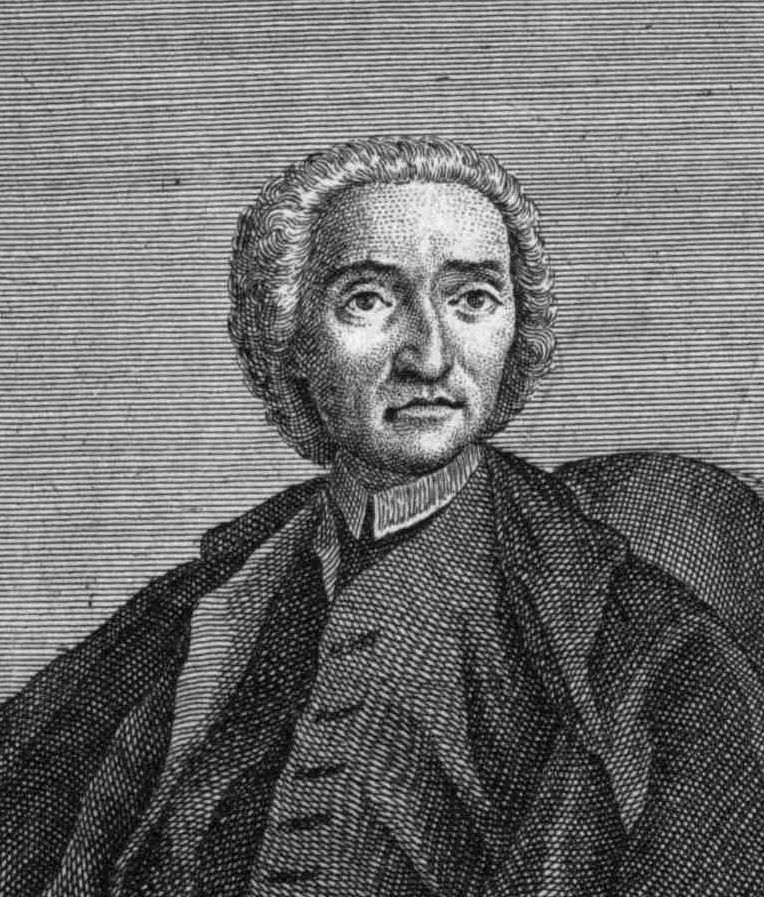
- Born: 1 December 1695; Ponte in Valtellina, Duchy of Milan
- Died: 21 November 1756; Milan, Duchy of Milan
- Education: University of Pavia
- Occupations: Writer, historian, literary historian

Francesco Saverio Quadrio (1 December 1695 – 21 November 1756) was an Italian scholar, historian, and writer. His most famous work is Della storia e della ragione di ogni poesia, a voluminous history of poetry, theatre, and music. It is considered the earliest attempt to produce a universal literary encyclopedia.

== Biography ==
Quadrio was born in Ponte in Valtellina. He joined the Jesuits and trained as a scholar, but finding himself uncomfortable with religious life, became suspicious and despondent, and suffered poor health from mental stress. In 1744, having received permission for a country sojourn, he reached a decision on the high road near Como to leave the order and proceeded to Switzerland, where he lived for some time, refusing offers from Protestant scholarly associations and becoming involved in several controversies. He next moved to Paris, where he met Voltaire. Finally, Pope Benedict XIV, having always treated him with decided forbearance, provided him assistance, and he retired to a convent of Barnabites. He died in Milan.

== Works ==
His most important work is the seven-volume Della storia e della ragione di ogni poesia (Bologna/Milan, 1739–1752), "an elaborate history of poetry, which," according to the 1863 Imperial Dictionary of Universal Biography, "bears the stamp of conscientiousness and unsparing industry, but has been judged inaccurate, and as regards English literature is singularly jejune and inadequate." The 1819 Cyclopaedia; or, Universal Dictionary of Arts, Sciences, and Literature writes: "The author seems a mere compiler, without selection, taste, or accuracy. It is a heavy work, hardly interesting enough to stimulate a regular perusal; and from the disorder of arrangement, very difficult to consult." Barbara Reynolds, writing in The New Grove Dictionary of Opera (1992), points out that it includes much valuable information on the history of music and early instruments, including illustrations. Volumes 2 and 3 contain articles on melodramma, oratorio, and cantata. Volume 3, part 2 (pp. 425–563), which has lists of singers, actors, writers, stage designers, costume designers, and inventors of stage machinery, and comments on production, is "invaluable for historians of opera."

Quadrio also published, among other works, the Dissertazioni critico-storiche intorno alla Rezia di qua dalle Alpi, oggi detta Valtellina (1755), which testifies to his learning and has a preface explaining his motives in changing his calling.

== Bibliography ==
- Rees, Abraham (1819). The Cyclopaedia; or, Universal Dictionary of Arts, Sciences, and Literature. London: Longman, Hurst, Rees, Orme & Brown [etc.]. Catalog record at HathiTrust.
- Reynolds, Barbara (1992). "Quadrio, Francesco Saverio". In Stanley Sadie (ed.). The New Grove Dictionary of Opera. Vol. 3. London: Macmillan. p. 1191. ISBN 9780935859928..
- Waller, John Francis; Eadie, John; editors (1863). The Imperial Dictionary of Universal Biography, 3 volumes. Glasgow: William MacKenzie. Vols. 1 (AA–CZU), 2 (DAA–IWA), and 3 (JAA–ZWI) at HathiTrust.
- Lindon, J. (2002). "Quadrio, Francesco Saverio". The Oxford Companion to Italian Literature. Oxford: Oxford University Press.
