= Thomas Bendish =

English diplomat (c. 1607-1674)

Sir Thomas Bendysh Bt

British ambassador to the Ottoman Empire
- In office 1647–1655
- Preceded by: Sir Sackville Crowe
- Succeeded by: Heneage Finch, 3rd Earl of Winchilsea

Personal details
- Born: c. 1607
- Died: 1674 Bower Hall, Steeple Bumpstead, Essex, England

Sir Thomas Bendysh, 2nd Baronet (c. 1607 – 1674) served as the English ambassador to the Ottoman sultanate in the mid-17th century.

== Life ==
Son of Sir Thomas Bendish, 1st Baronet of Bower Hall, Steeple Bumpstead, Essex, Bendish the younger enrolled in Middle Temple in 1626, after earlier studying at St John's College, Cambridge. Later in life, he donated fifty books to St John's, of which forty are still kept today.

Sir Thomas succeeded to the Baronetcy in 1636. A decade later he was banned from Essex, had his estates seized, and was imprisoned in the Tower of London after siding with King Charles I during the English Civil War. He was released on 28 September 1644, after paying a 1,000 pound fine, although he remained banned from coming within 20 miles of Essex.

Bendysh was appointed on 8 January 1647. On 29 January 1647 the House of Lords confirmed that Sir Thomas was named as ambassador to the Ottoman Empire. A Royal Commission set up by parliament followed on 1 February. Bendysh received articles with the Levant Company from 18 March, set sail and arrived in Constantinople by 26 September. Upon his entrance to Constantinople (now Istanbul) he was confronted by the previous ambassador, who refused to relinquish his post, and had to be forcibly removed from office.

While in office, it is known that Sir Thomas personally saw to Isaac Barrow. He was imprisoned by the Ottomans at one point due to a commercial dispute with clerics.

Bendysh was recalled from his post some time before 1655 but he continued to offer his services without commission. He was recalled by Cromwell's Protectorate at the Restoration on 25 June 1660. However, in light of the changing political situation, he delayed his departure until 11 March 1661.

He died at his home in Bower Hall in 1674. He was succeeded by son and heir Sir John Bendish, 3rd Baronet (1630–1707).

== Family ==
Sir Thomas's wife Anne, the daughter of Henry Baker, died before 1661 in Constantinople and was buried at Steeple Bumstead.

== See also ==
- List of baronetcies in the Baronetage of England: Bendish of Steeple Bumpstead, created 1611, extinct 1717.

== Notes ==
Diplomatic posts
Preceded by Sir Sackville Crowe	British ambassador to the Ottoman Empire; 1647–1655	Succeeded by Heneage Finch, 3rd Earl of Winchilsea
Baronetage of England
Preceded by Thomas Bendish	Baronet (of Steeple Bumpstead); 1636–1674	Succeeded by John Bendish
