= Henry Ireton (died 1711) =

English Army officer, landowner and Whig politician

Henry Ireton (c. 1652 – 1711), of Williamstrip, Gloucestershire, was an English Army officer, landowner and Whig politician who sat in the English and British House of Commons between 1698 and 1711.

Ireton was the only son of General Henry Ireton of Attenborough, Nottinghamshire and his wife Bridget Cromwell, daughter of Oliver Cromwell. He succeeded his father in 1651. In 1684, he was accused of being involved in the Rye House Plot and escaped to Holland after a warrant was issued for his arrest. When he returned to England in April 1685, he was arrested at Harwich, where he was kept in custody until his escape on 19 May. He was subsequently recaptured and imprisoned in Newgate Prison. He was charged high treason before the King on 26 September 1685 but was eventually pardoned on 19 April 1686. He married Katherine Powle, daughter of Henry Powle, (MP).

Ireton was an Equerry to King William from 1689 to 1702, and gentleman of the horse from June 1691 to 1702, and served in the wars in Holland. After 1689 he became a captain in Colonel Godfrey's Horse and in 1693 a major in the ist Troop of Horse Guards. On the death of his father-in-law in 1692, he acquired estates including Williamstrip. He was lieutenant and lieutenant-colonel of the Grenadier Guards from 1694 to 1704. In 1696, he became a Commissioner for taking subscriptions to the land bank.

At the 1695 English general election, Ireton stood for Parliament at Cirencester where he was unknown and when he was on active service and was soundly defeated. However at the 1698 English general election, he was returned as Member of Parliament for Cirencester unopposed. He was returned again at the 1705 English general election. At the 1708 British general election he was returned instead as MP for Tewkesbury.

Ireton died without issue on 14 December 1711, aged 59. He was buried near his estate at Quenington.

== Sources ==
- Farr, David (2023). Oliver Cromwell's Kin, 1643-1726. Taylor & Francis.

Parliament of England
Preceded by Richard Howe; John Grubham Howe	Member of Parliament for Cirencester; 1698–1701; With: Charles Coxe	Succeeded by James Thynne; Charles Coxe
Preceded by William Master; Charles Coxe	Member of Parliament for Cirencester; 1705–1707; With: Allen Bathurst	Succeeded by Parliament of Great Britain
Parliament of Great Britain
Preceded by Parliament of England	Member of Parliament for Cirencester; 1707–1708; With: Allen Bathurst	Succeeded by Allen Bathurst; Charles Coxe
Preceded by Richard Dowdeswell; Edmund Bray	Member of Parliament for Tewkesbury; 1708–1711; With: Richard Dowdeswell 1708–1710; William Bromley 1710–1711	Succeeded by William Bromley; William Dowdeswell
