= William Fisk (painter) =

English painter (1796–1872)

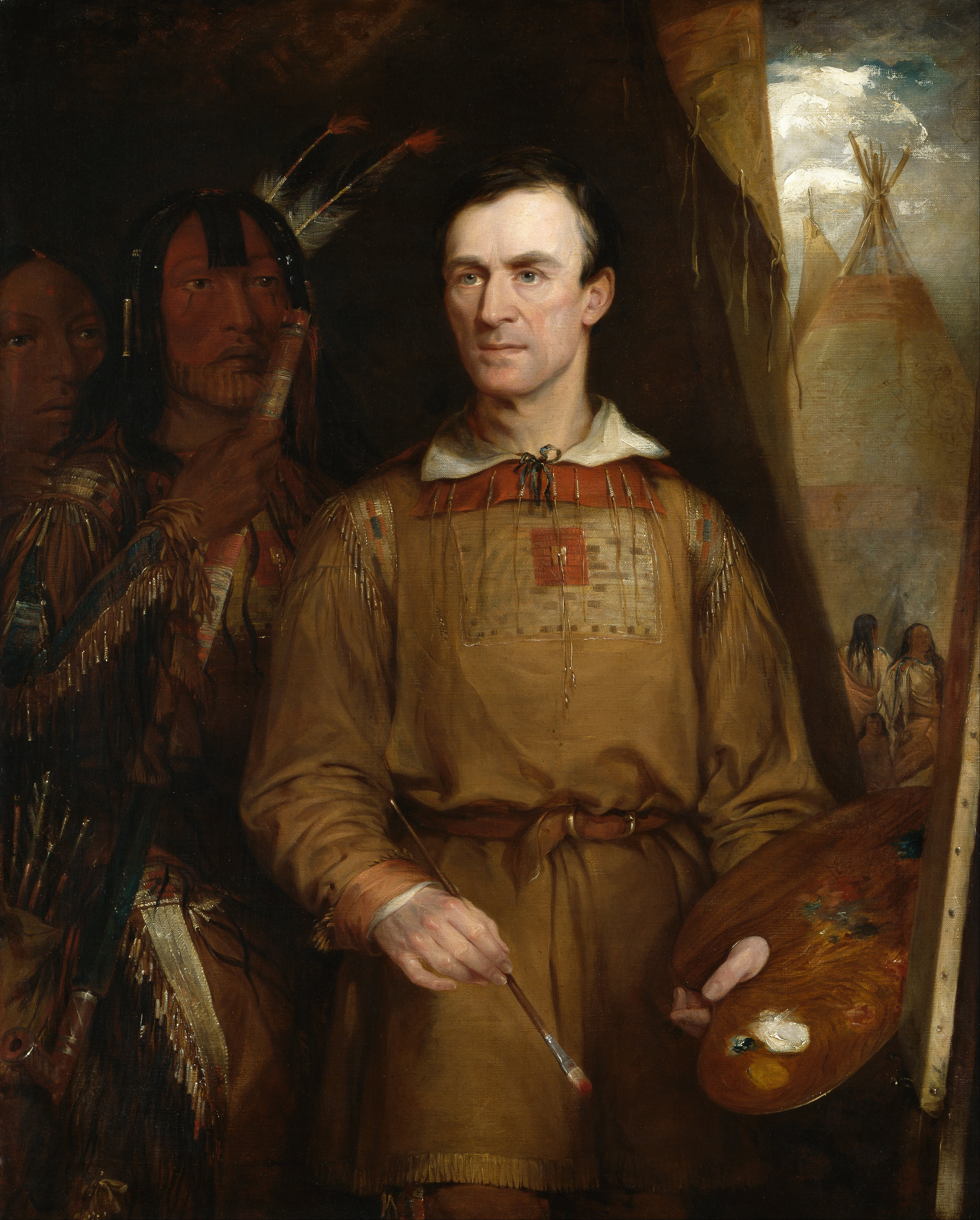
Portrait of George Catlin, 1849.

William Fisk (1796–1872) was an English portrait and history painter.

== Life ==
He was born at Thorpe-le-Soken, Essex, the son of a yeoman farmer at Can Hall. His father sent him to school at Colchester, and at nineteen years of age placed him in a mercantile house in London. There he remained for ten years. He married about 1826, and after the birth of his eldest son he devoted himself seriously to art as a profession.

Between 1835 and 1848 he lived in Howland Street, off Tottenham Court Road, in London. He eventually retired to some property at Danbury in Essex, where he died on 8 November 1872.

== Works ==
In 1818 Fisk sent to the Royal Academy a portrait of Mr. G. Fisk, and in 1819 a portrait of a Child and Favourite Dog. In 1829 he sent to the Royal Academy a portrait of William Redmore Bigg, R. A., and continued to exhibit portraits there for a few years. At the British Institution he exhibited in 1830 The Widow, and in 1832 Puck.

From about 1834 Fisk took to painting the large historical compositions, for which he became best known. He took care to obtain contemporary portraits and authorities for costume, which he faithfully reproduced on his canvases. Some of them were engraved, and were popular. They comprised Lady Jane Grey, when in confinement in the Tower, visited by Feckenhain (British Institution, 1834); The Coronation of Robert Bruce (Royal Academy, 1836); La Journée des Dupes (Royal Academy, 1837); Leonardo da Vinci expiring in the arms of Francis I (Royal Academy, 1838); The Chancellor Wriothesley approaching to apprehend Katherine Parr on a charge of heresy, and Mary, widow of Louis XII of France, receiving Charles Brandon, Duke of Suffolk, ambassador from Henry VIII (British Institution, 1838); The Queen Mother, Marie de' Medici, demanding the dismissal of Cardinal Richelieu (British Institution, 1839); The Conspiracy of the Pazzi, or the attempt to assassinate Lorenzo de' Medici (Royal Academy, 1839), which was awarded the gold medal of the Manchester Institution for the best historical picture exhibited in their gallery in 1840.

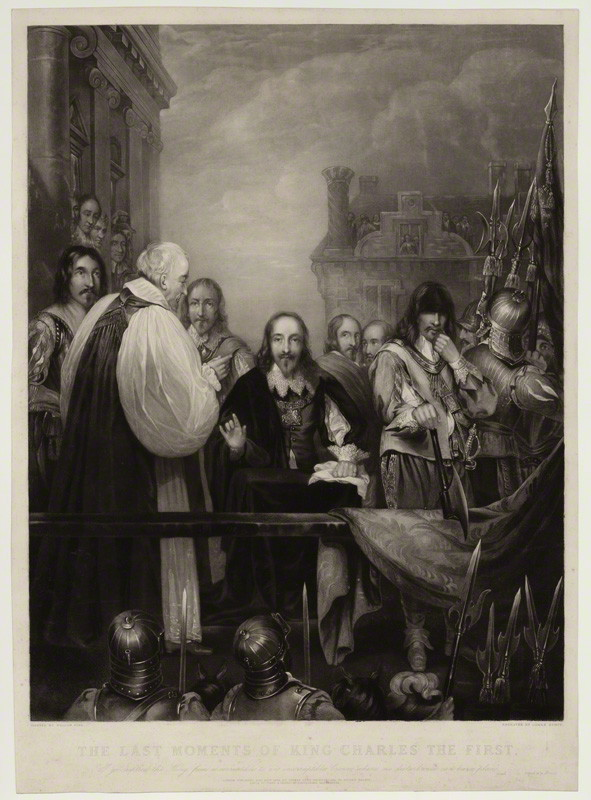
The Last Moments of King Charles the First, 1838 engraving by James Scott.

About 1840 Fisk started a series of pictures connected with the reign of Charles I, namely, Cromwell's Family interceding for the life of Charles I (Royal Academy, 1840); The Trial of the Earl of Strafford (never exhibited, engraved by James Scott in 1841, and acquired for the Walker Art Gallery, Liverpool); The Trial of Charles I in Westminster Hall (Royal Academy, 1842); Charles I passing through the banqueting-house, Whitehall, to the Scaffold (Royal Academy, 1843); The last interview of Charles I with his Children (British Institution, 1844). He was also a frequent contributor to the Suffolk Street exhibition.

His obituary in the Art Journal said that "if Mr. Fisk’s works may not be classed in a high rank of historical painting, they are most creditable examples — well composed, careful in execution, and accurate in costumes and accessories."

== Sources ==
Attribution

This article incorporates text from a publication now in the public domain: "Fisk, William (1796-1872)". Dictionary of National Biography. London: Smith, Elder & Co. 1885–1900.
