= Henry Ireton =

English politician and soldier (1611–1651)

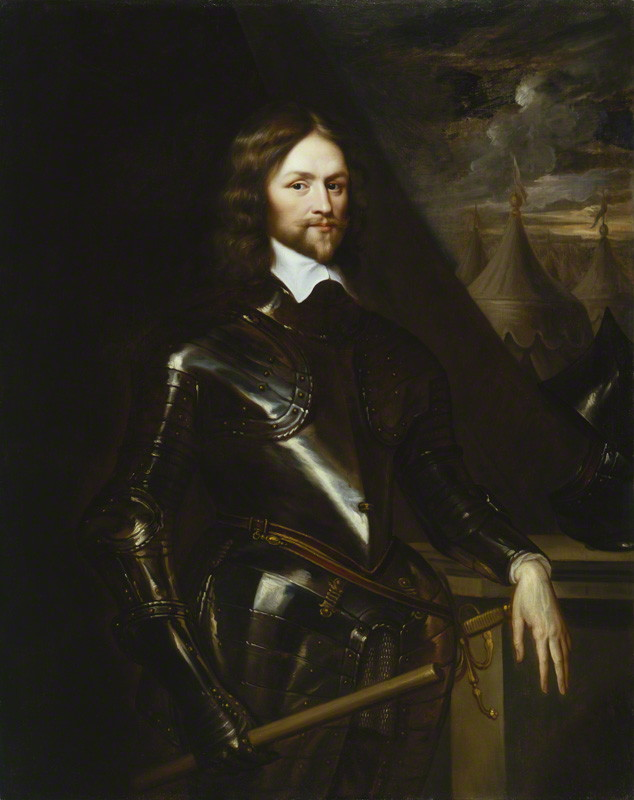
- Portrait by Robert Walker

Lord Deputy of Ireland
- In office 1650–1651

Member of Parliament for Appleby
- In office October 1645 – November 1651

Personal details
- Born: 1611 (baptised 3 November 1611) Attenborough, Nottinghamshire, England
- Died: 26 November 1651 (aged 40) Limerick, Ireland
- Spouse: Bridget Cromwell (1646 – his death)
- Children: 5, including Henry and Bridget
- Education: Trinity College, Oxford
- Occupation: Political and religious radical, regicide and Parliamentarian soldier

Military service
- Years of service: 1642–1651
- Rank: Colonel
- Battles/wars: Wars of the Three Kingdoms; Edgehill; Gainsborough; First Newbury; Marston Moor; Second Newbury; Naseby; Bristol; Oxford; Maidstone; Colchester; Cromwellian conquest of Ireland; Drogheda; Waterford; Limerick

Henry Ireton (baptised 3 November 1611; died 26 November 1651) was an English general in the Parliamentarian army during the Wars of the Three Kingdoms, and a son-in-law of Oliver Cromwell. He died of disease outside Limerick in November 1651.

== Personal details ==
Ireton was the eldest son of German Ireton of Attenborough, Nottinghamshire, and was baptised in St Mary's Church on 3 November 1611. He became a gentleman commoner of Trinity College, Oxford, in 1626, graduated with a Bachelor of Arts in 1629, and entered the Middle Temple the same year.

== English Civil War ==
On the outbreak of the First English Civil War he joined the parliamentary army, fighting at the Battle of Edgehill in October 1642 and the Battle of Gainsborough in July 1643. He was made deputy-governor of the Isle of Ely by Oliver Cromwell, and served under the Earl of Manchester in the Yorkshire campaign and at the second Battle of Newbury, afterward supporting Cromwell in his accusations of incompetency against the Earl.

On the night before the Battle of Naseby, in June 1645, Ireton succeeded in surprising the Royalist army and captured many prisoners. The next day, on the suggestion of Cromwell, he was made commissary-general and appointed to the command of the left wing, with Cromwell himself commanding the right. The wing under Ireton was completely broken by the impetuous charge of Prince Rupert, and Ireton was wounded and taken prisoner, but Cromwell charged and successfully routed the Royalists, freeing prisoners including Ireton.

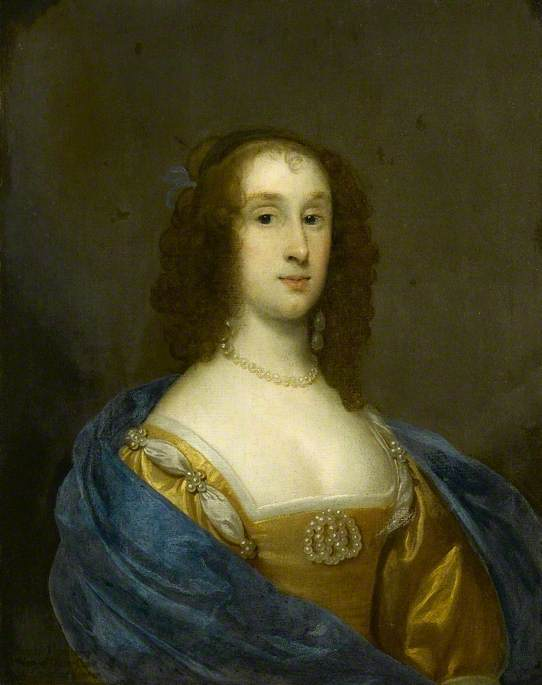
Henry Ireton married Bridget Cromwell (pictured), daughter of Oliver Cromwell, during the Siege of Oxford

Ireton was at the siege of Bristol in September 1645, and took part in the subsequent campaign that succeeded in overthrowing the royal cause. On 30 October 1645, Ireton entered parliament as member for Appleby. On 15 June 1646, during the siege of Oxford he married Bridget Cromwell, eldest daughter of Oliver Cromwell. The marriage brought Ireton's career into parallel with Cromwell's.

== Political views and debates over the future of the monarchy ==
Ireton was initially a moderate. At the Putney Debates, he opposed extremism, disliked the views of the Republicans and the Levellers, which he considered impractical and dangerous to the foundations of society, and wished to retain a constitutional monarchy of King, Lords, and Commons. He argued for these in the negotiations of the army with Parliament, and in the conferences with the King, Charles I, being the person chiefly entrusted with the drawing up of the army proposals, including the manifesto called "The Heads of the Proposals", which also proposed a constitutional monarchy. He tried to prevent the breach between the army and parliament, but when it happened, he supported the negotiations with the King until Charles I's intransigence in negotiation and continued political scheming left him unpopular with moderate War Party figures like Ireton.

Ireton finally became convinced of the hopelessness of dealing with King Charles, and after the King's flight to the Isle of Wight, treated his further proposals with coldness and urged the parliament to establish an administration without him. Ireton served under Thomas Fairfax in the Second Civil War in the campaigns in Kent and Essex, although Fairfax, as Lord General, and not Ireton as is sometimes believed, was responsible for the executions of Sir Charles Lucas and Sir George Lisle at Colchester. After the rejection by the King of the last offers of the army, Ireton zealously supported bringing him to trial. He wrote the Army's statement about the regicide—the Remonstrance of the Army—with Hugh Peters. He was active in the choice to purge rather than re-elect Parliament and supported the second Leveller Agreement of the People. He sat on the King's trial and was one of the commissioners who signed the death warrant.

== Irish campaign and death ==
Ireton's regiment was chosen by lot to accompany Cromwell in his Irish campaign. Ireton arrived in Dublin two days after Cromwell on 17 August 1649, with 77 ships full of troops and supplies. Ireton was appointed major-general and after the conquest of the south of Ireland, Lord President of Munster. He went over with John Cook with a brief to reform the law of Ireland, to anglicise it, and to make it a model for a new settlement of English law.

In May 1650, Cromwell was recalled to England to command a Parliamentary force preparing to invade Scotland, and Ireton assumed command of the New Model Army in Ireland with the title and powers of Lord Deputy to complete the conquest of the country. This he proceeded to do, becoming noted as much by the savagery of his methods as for his military skill. By the middle of 1650, Ireton and his commanders faced two problems. One was the capture of the remaining cities held by the Irish Confederate and Royalists forces. The other was an escalating guerrilla war in the countryside as Irish fighters called tories attacked his supply lines. Ireton appealed to the English Parliament to publish lenient surrender terms for Irish Catholics, to end their resistance, but this was refused.

His first action after the refusal was to mount a counter-guerrilla expedition into the Wicklow Mountains early in June 1650, to secure his lines of supply for the Siege of Waterford in south-east Ireland. Ireton then blockaded Waterford into surrender by August 1650. Ireton systematically constructed trenches to bring his siege guns within range of the walls and stationed a parliamentary fleet off the city to prevent it being supplied. Thomas Preston surrendered Waterford after a three-month siege. Ireton then advanced to Limerick by October, but had to call off the siege due to cold and bad weather. Early in 1651, Ireton ordered that areas harbouring the guerrillas should be systematically stripped of food – a scorched-earth policy that caused a famine in Ireland by the end of the year. Ireton returned to Limerick in June 1651 and besieged the city for five months until it surrendered in October 1651. At the same time, parliamentarian forces conducted the Siege of Galway, and Ireton rode to inspect the command of Charles Coote, who was blockading that city. The physical strain of his command took hold on Ireton and he fell ill.

After the capture of Limerick, Ireton had dignitaries of Limerick hanged for their defence of the city, including Alderman Thomas Stritch, Bishop Turlough O'Brien, and an English Royalist officer, Colonel Fennell. He also wanted the Irish commander, Hugh Dubh O'Neill hanged, but Edmund Ludlow cancelled the order after Ireton's death.

Ireton fell ill of the plague that was raging through the town, and died on 26 November. His loss reportedly "struck a great sadness into Cromwell" and he was considered a great loss to the Commonwealth of England. There are various anecdotes about his demise from Irish ecclesiastical and English Royalist sources. Thus, Ireton's death has been depicted as divine retribution for the hanging of Bishop O'Brien, who prior to his death had called upon Ireton to answer at God's judgment seat for the New Model Army's massacres; the Hibernica Dominicana claims that on his death bed, Ireton was "privately muttering to himself, 'I never gave the aid of my counsel towards the murder of that bishop; never, never; it was the council of war did it… I wish I had never seen this popish bishop'." Meanwhile, the memoirs of English Cavalier officer Philip Warwick allege that, in his delirious state, Ireton's last words were, "Blood! blood! I must have more blood!"

At Ireton's funeral, in Westminster Abbey, John Watson and others wore new tabards that replaced the royal arms with the new arms of the Commonwealth.

== Family ==
By his wife, Bridget Cromwell, Ireton left one son, Henry Ireton (circa 1652–1711), and four daughters, one of whom, Bridget Bendish (she married Thomas Bendish in 1670) is said to have compromised herself in the Rye House Plot of 1683, as did Henry. Ireton's widow Bridget afterward married General Charles Fleetwood. Another daughter, Elizabeth, married Thomas Polhill; their son was David Polhill.

== Posthumous execution ==
On 30 January 1661, following the Restoration of the English monarchy of 1660, Charles II had Ireton's corpse exhumed from Westminster and mutilated in a posthumous execution, along with those of Cromwell and John Bradshaw, in retribution for signing his father's death warrant. The date was symbolic, being the 12th anniversary of the execution of Charles I.

== Memorials ==
A blue plaque was affixed to Ireton's birthplace at Church Lane in Attenborough, on 22 June 2011, by the Beeston and District Local History Society with the following text: "General Henry Ireton lawyer, confederate and son-in-law of Oliver Cromwell born here 1611 died Limerick 1651". The town of Ireton, Iowa, United States was named after Henry Ireton.

Ireton Avenue in Beeston near to Attenborough is named after General Ireton. Ireton Road in Market Harborough was also named after Henry Ireton, while Ireton's Way is now a very straight part of the A142 between Ely and Chatteris, built by Ireton when he was commanding East Anglian forces as a causeway across the flooded Fens around the River Ouse to rush troops and supplies over when resisting Royalist attack from Lincolnshire and the Midlands.

Ireton Street in Walton, Liverpool sits off County Road (A59) in between (William) Lenthall Street and (John) Hampden Street.

There is an Ireton Street in Belfast, Northern Ireland, which runs parallel to a Cromwell Road. Also, an Ireton Road is in Colchester. This adjoins Honywood Road, named after Sir Thomas Honywood, who led the Essex forces at the Siege of Colchester under the command of Thomas Fairfax.

An Ireton Avenue exists in Walton-on-Thames as well as 'Ireton's House' on the high street. 'Ireton's House' was gifted to Henry Ireton by Oliver Cromwell after the marriage to Bridget Cromwell.

His portrait continues to hang in the dining hall of Trinity College, Oxford.

== Fictional portrayals ==
In the 1970 film Cromwell, Michael Jayston plays Ireton as a subtle but well-meaning manipulator who hates Charles I and pushes Cromwell into actions which Cromwell at first considers neither desirable nor possible, but then pursues all the way. This version of Ireton is ready to denounce the King and plunge England into civil war before Cromwell becomes convinced that this is a necessary step. In the film, Cromwell and he are also among the five members whom Charles I attempts to arrest on the eve of the war (when in fact they were not), and after the King is executed, is upbraided by Cromwell as being too ambitious. The film makes no mention of Ireton's marriage to Cromwell's daughter, Bridget.

Ireton is portrayed as a minor character in Rosemary Sutcliff's 1953 historical fiction novel Simon.

Ireton is the main character in John Attenborough's 1987 historical novel Destiny Our Choice, which gives a generally positive view of Ireton, claiming that he was influential in saving the life of Hugh O'Neill after the Siege of Limerick in 1650–51.

== Notes ==
Political offices
Preceded by Oliver Cromwell (Lord Lieutenant)	Lord Deputy of Ireland; 1650–1651	Succeeded by Charles Fleetwood
