= Charles Fleetwood =

English Parliamentarian soldier and politician, Lord Deputy of Ireland

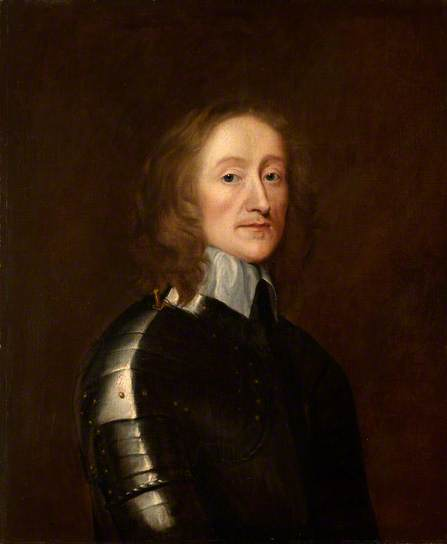
- Portrait by Robert Walker

Commander-in-Chief & Committee of Safety
- In office June 1659 – December 1659

Lord Deputy of Ireland
- In office September 1652 – July 1657

English Council of State
- In office February 1651 – July 1652

Member of Parliament for Marlborough
- In office May 1646 – January 1655 (reseated May 1659)

Personal details
- Born: Fleetwood c. 1618 Aldwinkle, Northamptonshire, England
- Died: 4 October 1692 (aged 74) Stoke Newington, London, England
- Resting place: Bunhill Fields
- Spouse(s): (1) Frances Smith (1641–1651) (2) Bridget Cromwell (1652–1662) (3) Mary Coke (1663–1684)
- Children: (1) Frances (1642–1711); Smith (1644–1708) (2) Cromwell (1653–1688); Ann (1654–1660); Mary (1656–1722)
- Parent: Miles Fleetwood (father)
- Education: Emmanuel College, Cambridge
- Occupation: Soldier and politician

Military service
- Rank: Major General
- Battles/wars: Wars of the Three Kingdoms; First Newbury; Siege of Banbury Castle; Siege of York; Marston Moor; Naseby; Langport; Bristol 1645; Basing House; Oxford; Dunbar; Worcester

Charles Fleetwood (c. 1618 – 4 October 1692) was an English lawyer from Northamptonshire who served with the Parliamentarian army during the Wars of the Three Kingdoms. A close associate of Oliver Cromwell, to whom he was related by marriage, Fleetwood held a number of senior political and administrative posts under the Commonwealth, including Lord Deputy of Ireland from 1652 to 1655.

After Cromwell's death in September 1658, Fleetwood initially supported his son Richard Cromwell as Lord Protector, before forcing him from power in April 1659. Together with John Lambert, he dominated government for a little over a year before being outmaneuvered by George Monck.

Following the Stuart Restoration, Fleetwood was excluded from the Act of Indemnity of 1660, but escaped prosecution since he had not been involved in the execution of Charles I in January 1649. Instead, he was barred from public office, and lived quietly in Stoke Newington, where he died on 4 October 1692.

== Early life ==
Charles Fleetwood was the third son of Sir Miles Fleetwood of Aldwinkle, Northamptonshire, and of Anne, daughter of Nicholas Luke of Wood End, Bedfordshire. He may have been educated at Emmanuel College, Cambridge, before being admitted into Gray's Inn on 30 November 1638.

== English Civil War ==
At the beginning of the First English Civil War in August 1642, like many other young lawyers who afterwards distinguished themselves in the field, he joined Essex’s life-guard, was wounded at the first battle of Newbury (1643), obtained a regiment in 1644 and fought at Naseby. He had already been appointed receiver of the court of wards, and in 1646 became member of parliament for Marlborough. In the dispute between the army and parliament he played a chief part, and was said to have been the principal author of the plot to seize King Charles at Holmby, but he did not participate in the king’s trial. In 1649 he was appointed a governor of the Isle of Wight, and in 1650, as lieutenant-general of the horse, took part in Cromwell’s campaign in Scotland and assisted in the victory of Dunbar. The next year he was elected a member of the Council of State, and being recalled from Scotland was entrusted with the command of the forces in England, and played a principal part in gaining the final triumph at Worcester (3 September 1651).

== Ireland ==
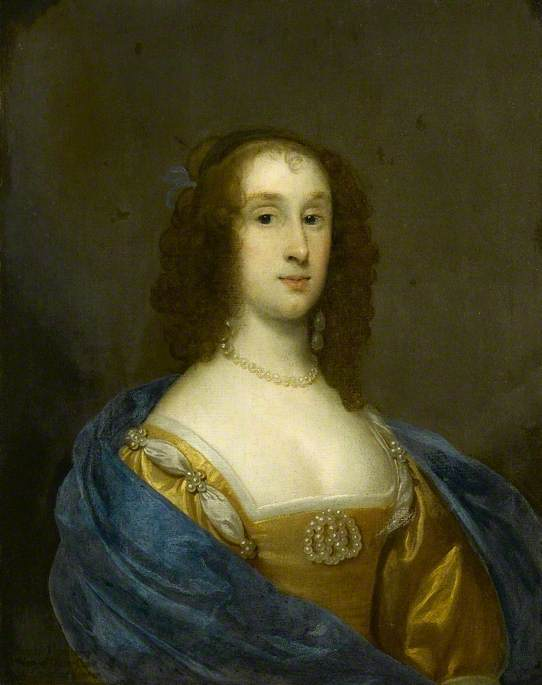
Fleetwood's second wife Bridget Cromwell, widow of Henry Ireton and daughter of Oliver Cromwell

In 1652 he married Cromwell’s daughter, Bridget, widow of Henry Ireton, and became commander-in-chief of the Parliamentarian forces in Ireland, to which title that of Lord Deputy of Ireland was added. The first year of his tenure saw the mopping up of the last Catholic Irish guerrilla resistance to the Cromwellian conquest of Ireland. Fleetwood negotiated with the remaining guerrilla bands to either surrender or to leave the country for service in the army of a country not at war with the Commonwealth of England. The last organised Irish force surrendered in 1653.

The chief feature of his civilian administration, which lasted from September 1652 till September 1655, was the implementation of the Act of Settlement 1652, which decreed the settlement of the New Model Army's soldiers on the confiscated estates of Catholic landowners and the transplantation of the original owners. Fleetwood carried out these policies ruthlessly. (For details of this period see The Cromwellian plantation.) He showed also great severity in the prosecution of the Roman Catholic priests, and favoured the Anabaptists and the extreme Puritan sects to the disadvantage of the moderate Presbyterians, exciting great and general discontent, a petition being finally sent in for his recall.

== Career under the Protectorate ==
Fleetwood was a strong and unswerving follower of Cromwell's policy. He supported Cromwell's assumption of the position of Lord Protector and his dismissal of the parliaments. In December 1654 he became a member of the council, and after his return to England in 1655 was appointed one of the administrative major-generals. He approved of the Humble Petition and Advice, only objecting to the conferring of the title of "king" on Cromwell; became a member of the new House of Lords; and supported ardently Cromwell's foreign policy in Europe, based on religious divisions, and his defence of the Protestants persecuted abroad. He was therefore, on Cromwell's death, naturally regarded as a likely successor, and it is said that Cromwell had in fact so nominated him. He, however, gave his support to Richard Cromwell's assumption of office, but allowed subsequently, if he did not instigate, petitions from the army demanding its independence, and finally (with the aid of the other officers in the Wallingford House party) compelled Richard by force to dissolve the Third Protectorate Parliament.

His project of re-establishing Richard in close dependence upon the army met with failure, and he was obliged to recall the Rump Parliament on 6 May 1659. He was appointed immediately a member of the Committee of Safety and of the Council of State, and one of the seven commissioners for the army, while on 9 June 1659 he was nominated commander-in-chief. In reality, however, his power was undermined and was attacked by parliament, which in October declared his commission void. The next day he assisted John Lambert in his expulsion of the Rump Parliament and was reappointed commander-in-chief.

== Collapse of the Protectorate and Restoration of the Monarchy ==
With the suppression of parliament, the Committee of Safety led by Fleetwood and Lambert was nominally left as absolute ruler of the Commonwealth. The regime was practically without public support however. Presbyterians opposed the Committee for its perceived devotion to the Independents cause, republicans had been alienated by the dissolution of parliament and pay for the rank and file of the army was long in arrears.

Several Parliamentarian Generals led by George Monck had decided that the only way to stabilise the country was to restore the monarchy. Monck accordingly led his troops, which had been garrisoned in Scotland, to march on London. On George Monck's approach from the North, Fleetwood stayed in London and maintained order. While hesitating with which party to ally his forces, and while on the point of making terms with King Charles II, Monck's army restored the Rump Parliament on 24 December, whereupon Fleetwood was deprived of his command and ordered to appear before parliament to answer for his conduct.

The reversal of Pride's Purge with the re-admittance of the members of Long Parliament to the Rump, the Convention Parliament and the start of the Restoration therefore all took place without his influence. He was included in the Act of Indemnity as among the twenty liable to penalties other than capital, and was finally incapacitated from holding any office of trust. His public career then closed, though he survived till 4 October 1692. He was buried in Bunhill Fields.

== Legacy ==
Fleetwood acquired by his marriage in 1664 to Mary, daughter of Sir John Coke and widow of Sir Edward Hartopp, an estate in Stoke Newington, then a village north of London; Fleetwood House, next to Abney House on Church Street was named after him. It served as a meeting place for Dissenters, and from 1824 housed the Newington Academy for Girls, an innovative Quaker school.

Cornelius Varley, a water-colour painter, named his son Cromwell Fleetwood "C.F." Varley (1828–1883), in the belief that the family was descended from both Fleetwood and Cromwell. The Varley family business was near Stoke Newington.

== Notes ==
Political offices
| Preceded by Henry Ireton | Lord Deputy of Ireland; 1652–1657 | Succeeded by Henry Cromwell |
