= Battle of Worcester =

1651 final battle of the English Civil War

Coordinates: 52°11′19″N 2°13′15″W

- Part of the Third English Civil War
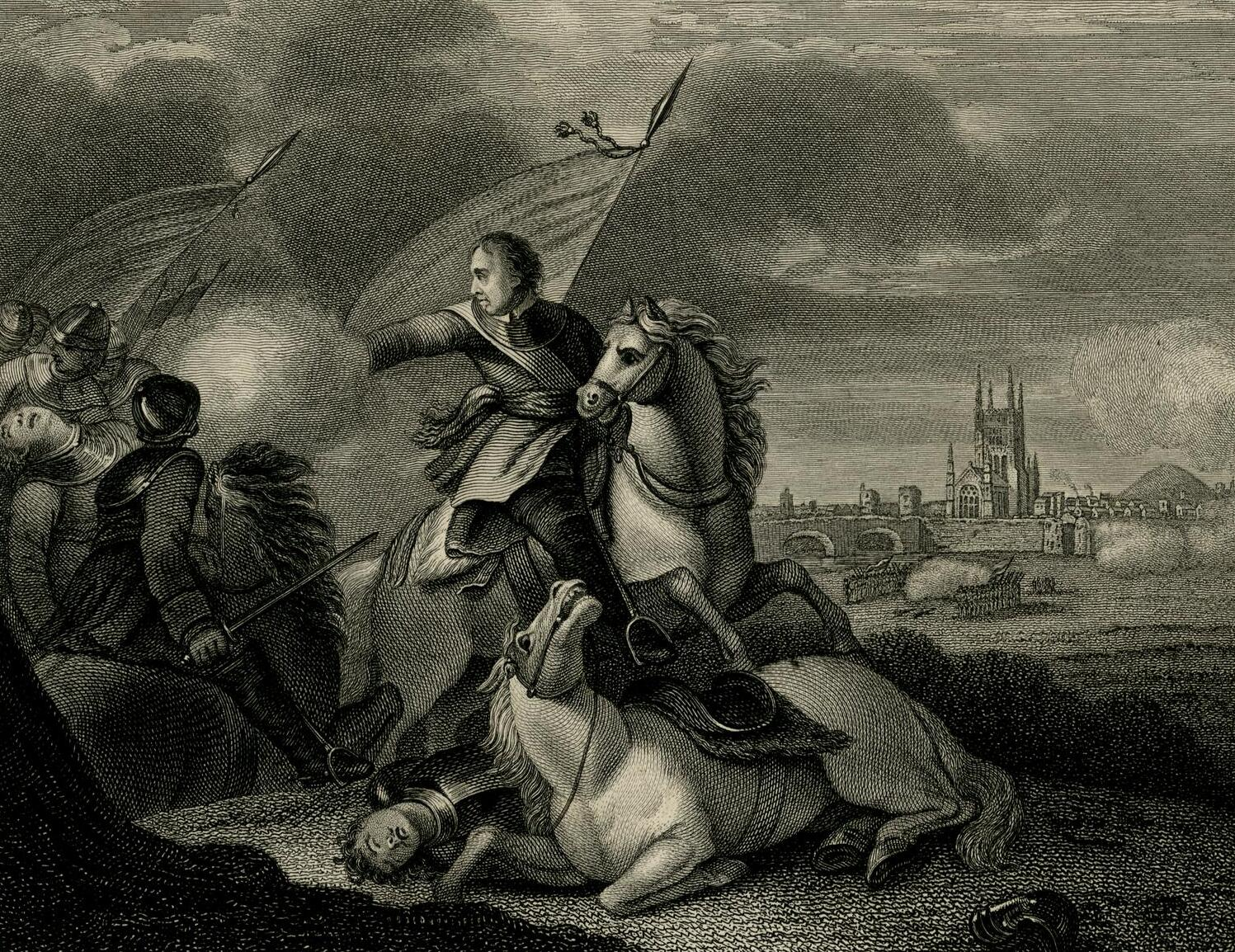
- Battle of Worcester, print by James Caldwall c. 1760 – c. 1770
Date	3 September 1651
Location	Worcester, England
Result	Decisive Parliamentarian victory

Belligerents
Parliamentarians	Royalists

Commanders and leaders
Oliver Cromwell; Charles Fleetwood; John Lambert; Major Mercer	Charles II; Earl of Derby; Earl of Shrewsbury; Earl of Cleveland; Edward Massey; Lord Newark

Strength
28,000	16,000

Casualties and losses
700 killed	3,000 killed 10,000 captured
- Worcester within England

The Battle of Worcester took place on 3 September 1651 in and around the city of Worcester, England and was the last major battle of the 1642 to 1651 Wars of the Three Kingdoms. A Parliamentarian army of around 28,000 under Oliver Cromwell defeated a largely Scottish Royalist force of 16,000 led by Charles II of England and Scotland.

The Royalists took up defensive positions in and around the city of Worcester. The area of the battle was bisected by the River Severn, with the River Teme forming an additional obstacle to the south-west of Worcester. Cromwell divided his army into two main sections, divided by the Severn, in order to attack from both the east and south-west. There was fierce fighting at river crossing points and two dangerous sorties by the Royalists against the eastern Parliamentary force were beaten back. Following the storming of a major redoubt to the east of the city, the Parliamentarians entered Worcester and organised Royalist resistance collapsed. Charles II was able to escape capture.

== Background ==
=== Invasion of England ===
The King was aided by Scottish allies and was attempting to regain the throne that had been lost when his father Charles I was executed three years before. The commander of the Scots, David Leslie, supported the plan of fighting in Scotland, where royal support was strongest. Charles, however, insisted on making war in England. He calculated that Cromwell's campaign north of the River Forth would allow the main Scottish Royalist army which was south of the Forth to steal the march on the Roundhead New Model Army in a race to London. He hoped to rally not merely the old faithful Royalists, but also the overwhelming numerical strength of the English Presbyterians to his standard. He calculated that his alliance with the Scottish Presbyterian Covenanters and his signing of the Solemn League and Covenant would encourage English Presbyterians to support him against the English Independent faction which had grown in power over the last few years. The Royalist army was kept well in hand, no excesses were allowed, and in a week the Royalists covered 150 miles in marked contrast to the Duke of Hamilton's ill-fated expedition of 1648. On 8 August the troops were given a well-earned rest between Penrith and Kendal. The exact location is marked by a stone monument at Black Dub on Crosby Ravensworth Fell near Shap, Cumbria (OS Grid Ref : NY 604108). An inscription on the monument reads "Here at Black Dub; the source of the Livennet, King Charles II regaled his army and drank of the water on his march from Scotland. August 8th 1651"

However the Royalists were mistaken in supposing that the enemy was unaware. Everything had been foreseen both by Cromwell and by the Council of State in Westminster. The latter had called out the greater part of the militia on 7 August. Lieutenant-General Charles Fleetwood began to draw together the midland contingents at Banbury. The London trained-bands turned out for field service no fewer than 14,000 strong. Every suspected Royalist was closely watched, and the magazines of arms in the country-houses of the gentry were for the most part removed into the strong places. On his part Cromwell had quietly made his preparations. Perth passed into his hands on 2 August and he brought back his army to Leith by 5 August. Thence he dispatched Lieutenant-General John Lambert with a cavalry corps to harass the invaders. Major-General Thomas Harrison was already at Newcastle picking the best of the county mounted-troops to add to his own regulars. On 9 August, Charles was at Kendal, Lambert hovering in his rear, and Harrison marching swiftly to bar his way at the Mersey. Thomas Fairfax emerged for a moment from his retirement to organize the Yorkshire levies, and the best of these as well as of the Lancashire, Cheshire and Staffordshire militias were directed upon Warrington, which Harrison reached on 15 August, a few hours in front of Charles's advanced guard. Lambert too, slipping round the left flank of the enemy, joined Harrison, and the English fell back (16 August), slowly and without letting themselves be drawn into a fight, along the London road.

=== Worcester campaign ===
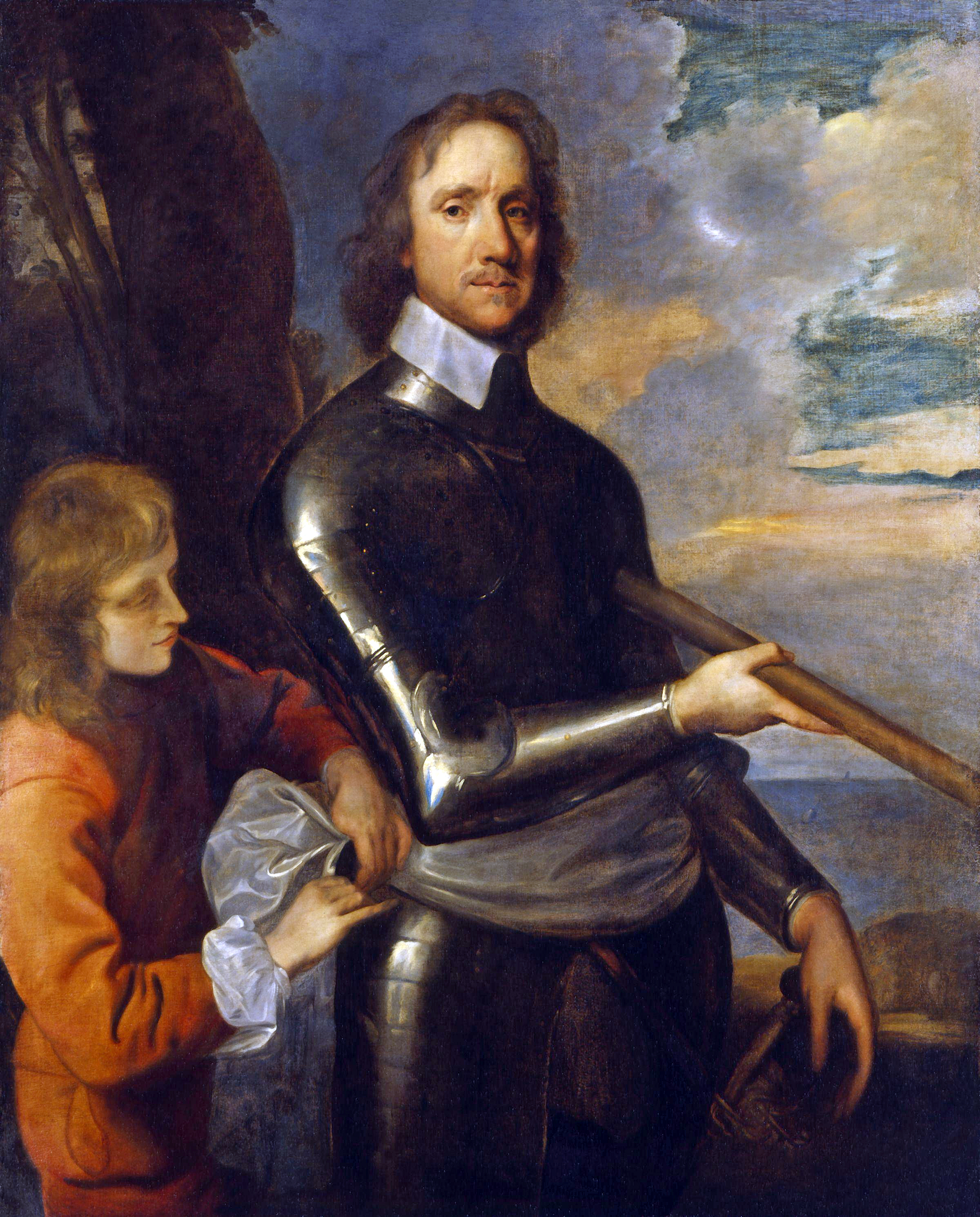
Portrait of Oliver Cromwell by Robert Walker, 1649

Cromwell meanwhile, leaving George Monck with the least efficient regiments to carry on the war in Scotland, had reached the river Tyne in seven days, and thence, marching 20 miles (32 km) a day in extreme heat with the country people carrying their arms and equipment, the regulars entered Ferrybridge on 19 August, at which date Lambert, Harrison and the north-western militia were about Congleton. It seemed probable that a great battle would take place between Lichfield and Coventry on or just after 25 August and that Cromwell, Harrison, Lambert and Fleetwood would all take part in it but the scene and the date of the denouement were changed by the Royalists' movements. Shortly after leaving Warrington the young king had resolved to abandon the direct march on London and to make for the Severn valley, where his father had found the most constant and the most numerous adherents in the first war, and which had been the centre of gravity of the English Royalist movement of 1648.

Sir Edward Massey, formerly the Parliamentary governor of Gloucester, was now with Charles, and it was hoped that he would induce his fellow Presbyterians to take arms. The military quality of the Welsh border Royalists was well proved, that of the Gloucestershire Presbyterians not less so, and, in basing himself on Gloucester and Worcester as his father had done on Oxford, Charles II hoped, naturally, to deal with the Independent faction minority of the English people more effectually than Charles I had earlier dealt with the majority of the people of England who had supported the Parliamentary cause. However the pure Royalism which now ruled in the invading army could not alter the fact that it was a foreign, Scottish, army, and it was not merely an Independent faction but all England that united against it.

Charles arrived at Worcester on 22 August and spent five days in resting the troops, preparing for further operations, and gathering and arming the few recruits who came in. The delay was to prove fatal; it was a necessity of the case foreseen and accepted when the march to Worcester had been decided upon, and had the other course, that of marching on London via Lichfield, been taken the battle would have been fought three days earlier with the same result. Worcester itself had no particular claim to being loyal to the King. Throughout the First Civil War it had taken the pragmatic position of declaring loyalty to whichever side had been in occupation. The epithet 'Faithful City' arose out of a cynical (and unsuccessful) claim at the Restoration for compensation from the new king.

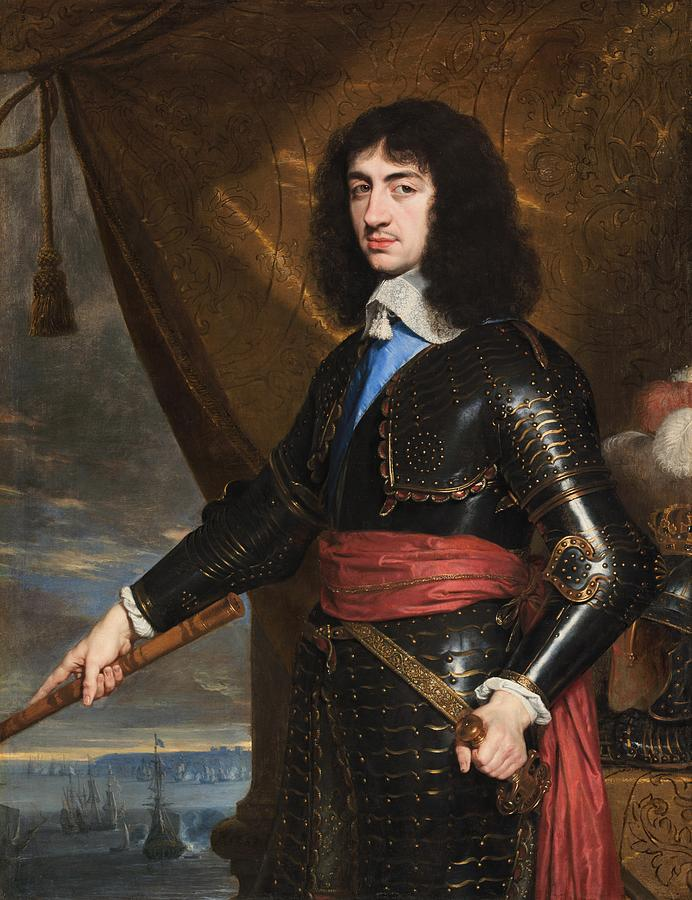
Charles II of England, circa 1653

Cromwell, the lord general, had during his march south thrown out successively two flying columns under Colonel Robert Lilburne to deal with the Lancashire Royalists under the Earl of Derby. Lilburne entirely routed a Lancashire detachment of the enemy on their way to join the main Royalist army at the Battle of Wigan Lane on 25 August and as affairs turned out Cromwell merely shifted the area of his concentration two marches to the south-west, to Evesham. Early on 28 August, Lambert's brigade made a surprise crossing of the Severn at Upton, 6 miles (9.7 km) below Worcester. In the action which followed Massey was severely wounded and he and his men were forced to retreat northwards along the west bank of the Severn towards the river Teme and Worcester. Fleetwood followed Lambert with reinforcements and orders to advance north towards the Teme. This western envelopment severed the Royalists' lines of communications to Wales and the western counties of England. The Royalists were now only 16,000 strong with no hope of significant reinforcements and disheartened by the apathy with which they had been received in districts formerly all their own. Cromwell, for the only time in his military career, had a two-to-one numerical superiority.

On 30 August Cromwell delayed the start of the battle to give time for two pontoon bridges to be constructed, one over the Severn and the other over the Teme, close to their confluence. The delay allowed Cromwell to launch his attack on 3 September, one year to the day since his victory at the Battle of Dunbar.

== Battle ==
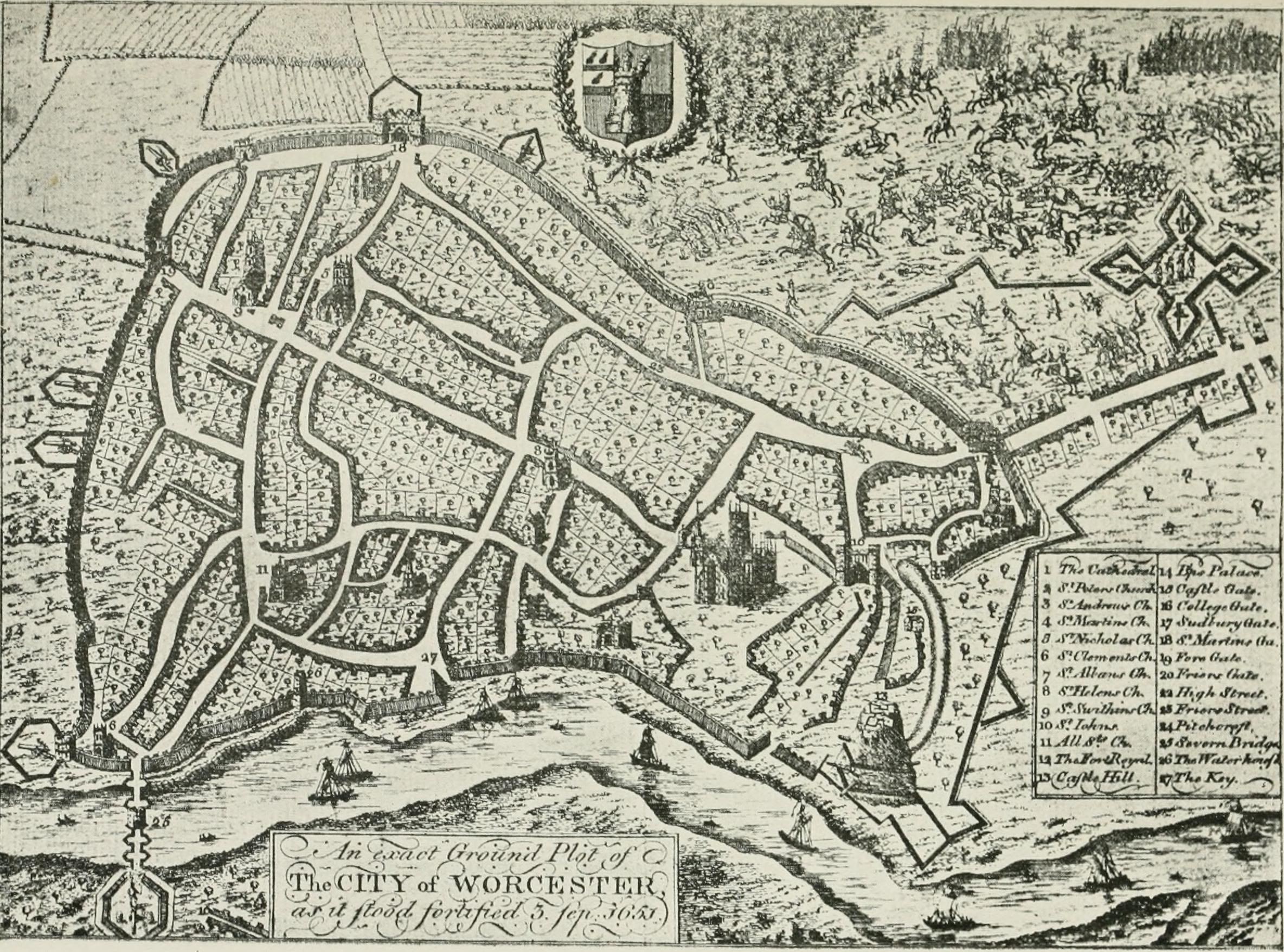
Plan of Worcester, with 1651 fortifications added.

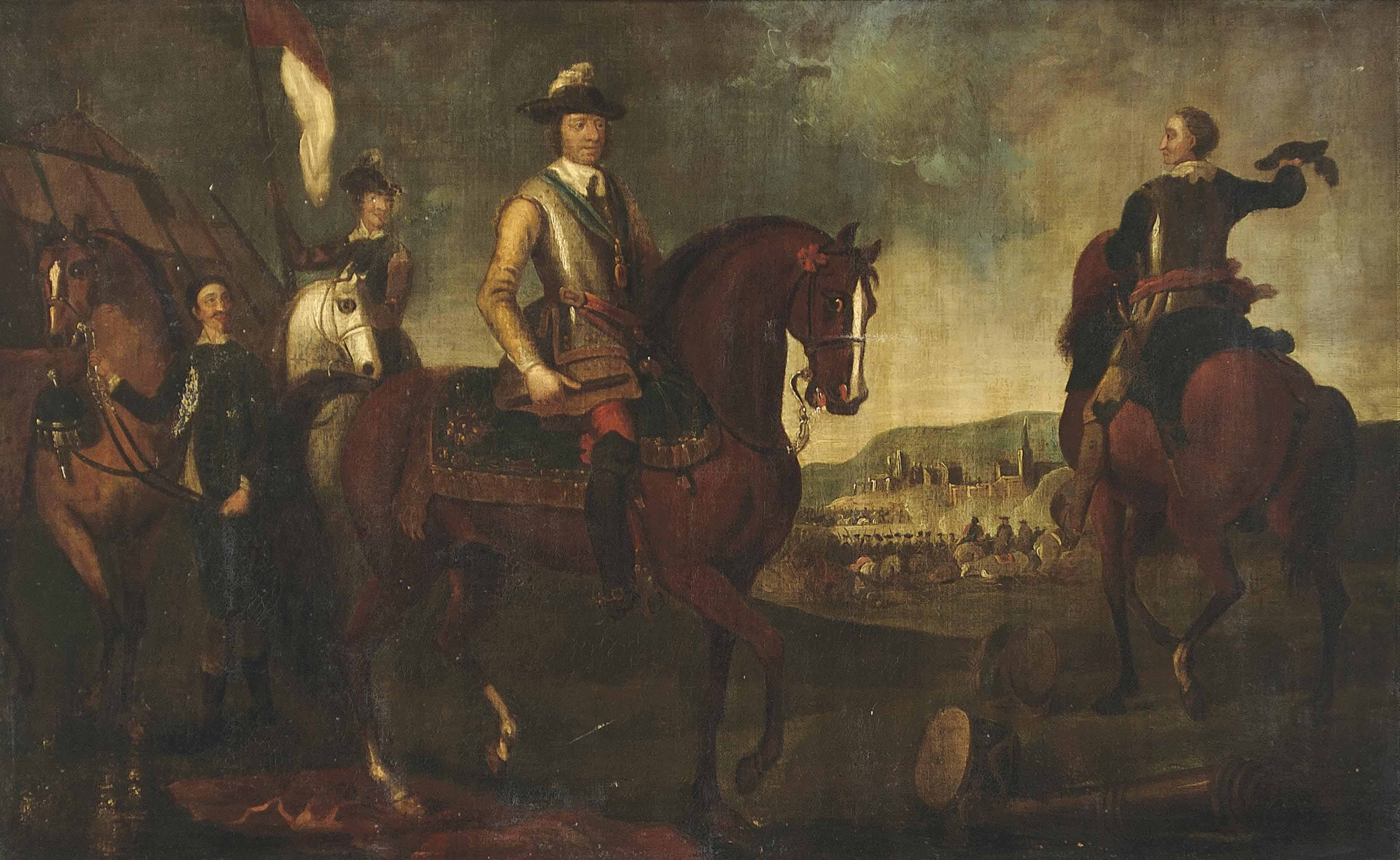
Oliver Cromwell at the Battle of Worcester, 17th century painting, artist unknown

Cromwell took his measures deliberately. Lilburne from Lancashire and Major Mercer with the Worcestershire horse were to secure Bewdley Bridge, 12 miles (19 km) north of Worcester and on the enemy's line of retreat. Fleetwood was to force his way across the Teme and attack St John's, the western suburb of Worcester. While Lambert commanded the eastern flank of the army, which would encircle the eastern walls of Worcester, Cromwell would lead the attack on the southern ramparts of the city.

The assault started on the morning of 3 September and initially the initiative lay with the Parliamentarians. Fleetwood forced the passage of the Teme over the pontoon bridges against Royalists under the command of Major General Montgomery. Colonel Richard Deane's initial attempts to cross the Powick Bridge (where Prince Rupert of the Rhine had won the Battle of Powick Bridge, his first victory, in 1642) failed against stubborn resistance by the Royalists (many of whom were Scottish Highlanders) commanded by Colonel Keith. By force of arms and numbers, the Royalist army was pushed backward by the New Model Army with Cromwell on the eastern bank of the Severn and Fleetwood on the western sweeping in a semicircle four miles (6 km) long up toward Worcester.

The Royalists contested every hedgerow around Powick meadows. This stubborn resistance on the west bank of the Severn north of the Teme was becoming a serious problem for the Parliamentarians, so Cromwell led Parliamentary reinforcements from the eastern side of the town over the Severn pontoon bridge to aid Fleetwood. Charles II, from his vantage point on top of Worcester Cathedral's tower, realised that an opportunity existed to attack the now-exposed eastern flank of the Parliamentary army. As the defenders on the Western side of the city retreated in good order into the city (although during this manoeuvre Keith was captured and Montgomery was badly wounded), Charles ordered two sorties to attack Lambert's Parliamentary forces east of the city. The north-eastern sortie through St Martin's Gate was commanded by the Duke of Hamilton and attacked the Parliamentary lines at Perry Wood. The south-eastern one through Sidbury Gate was led by Charles II and attacked Red Hill. The Royalist cavalry under the command of David Leslie that was gathered on Pitchcroft meadow on the northern side of the city did not receive orders to aid the sorties and Leslie chose not to do so under his own initiative. Cromwell, seeing the difficulty that his east flank was enduring, rushed back over the Severn pontoon bridge with three brigades of troops to reinforce the flank.

Although they were pushed back, the Parliamentarians under Lambert were too numerous and experienced to be shattered by the Royalist attack. For an hour, the Parliamentarians withdrew under the strong Royalist pressure. However, following their reinforcement by Cromwell's three brigades, they reversed the situation and drove the Royalists back toward the city. The Royalist retreat turned into a rout in which Parliamentarian and Royalist forces intermingled and skirmished up to and into the city. The Royalist position became untenable when the Essex militia stormed and captured Fort Royal, (a redoubt on a small hill to the south-east of Worcester overlooking the Sidbury gate), turning the Royalist guns to fire on Worcester.

Once in the city, Charles II removed his armour and found a fresh mount; he attempted to rally his troops but to no avail. A desperate Royalist cavalry charge down Sidbury Street and High Street, led by the Earl of Cleveland and Major Careless amongst others, allowed King Charles to escape the city by St Martin's Gate. This cavalry force was composed of the few Midland English Royalists who had rallied to Charles II, and largely consisted of Lord Talbot's troop of horse.

The defences of the city were stormed from three different directions as darkness came on, regulars and militia fighting with equal gallantry. Most of the few thousands of the Royalists who escaped during the night were easily captured by Lilburne and Mercer, or by the militia which watched every road in Yorkshire and Lancashire. Even the country people brought in scores of prisoners, for the Royalist officers and men alike, stunned by the suddenness of the disaster, offered no resistance.

== Aftermath ==
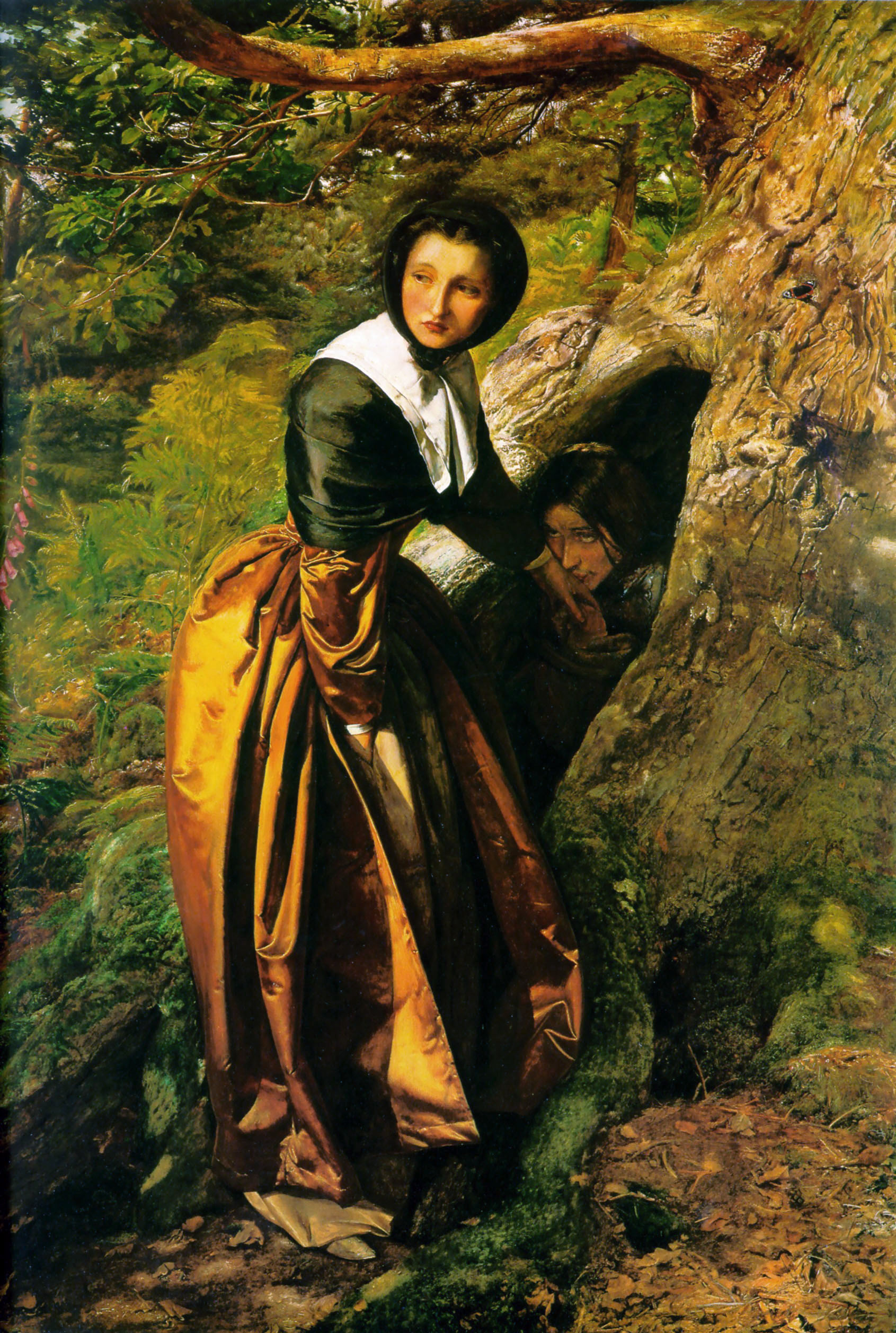
Painting, oil on canvas, The Proscribed Royalist, 1651 by John Everett Millais from 1853, depicting a fleeing Royalist after the Battle of Worcester being hidden within the trunk of a tree by a young Puritan woman

About 3,000 men were killed during the battle and a further 10,000 were taken prisoner at Worcester or soon afterwards. The Earl of Derby was executed, while the other English prisoners were conscripted into the New Model Army and sent to Ireland. Around 8,000 Scottish prisoners were deported to New England, Bermuda, and the West Indies to work for landowners as indentured labourers, or else to work on fen drainage. Around 1,200 "Scotch prisoners" were taken to London; many died from disease and starvation at Tothill Fields and other makeshift prison camps. Parliamentary casualties numbered in the low hundreds.

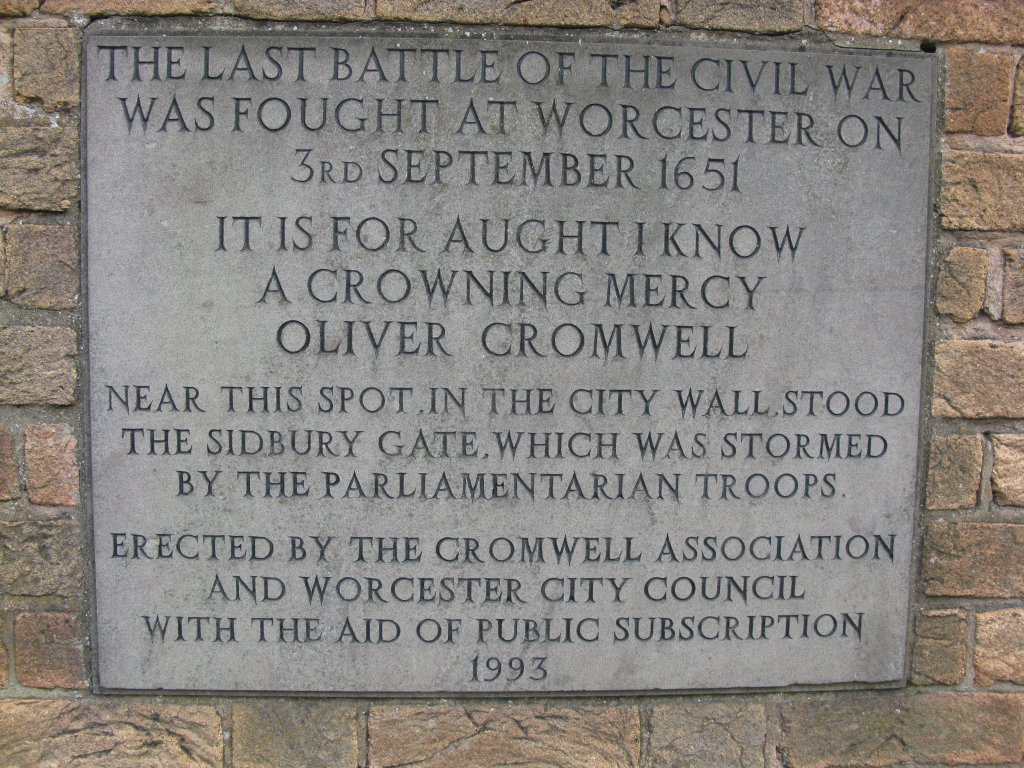
Plaque near the site of the Sidbury Gate, Worcester, inscribed with part of Cromwell's post-victory despatch: "IT IS FOR AUGHT I KNOW A CROWNING MERCY".

The escape of Charles II included various incidents, including one of his hiding from a Parliamentarian patrol in an oak tree in the grounds of Boscobel House. He reached the south coast of England, and at Shoreham found transport to take him to safety in France. In announcing the Worcester victory of the day earlier, Cromwell's 4 September despatch to William Lenthall, the Speaker of the House of Commons, has become famous: "The dimensions of this mercy are above my thoughts. It is, for aught I know, a crowning mercy". Hence, Cromwell thought the victory was the greatest of all the favours, or mercies, given to him by God. The expression "crowning mercy" is frequently linked to the battle as it heralded the end of the English Civil War by completely destroying the last major Royalist army.

The Parliamentary militia were sent home within a week. Cromwell, who had ridiculed "such stuff" six months ago, knew them better now. "Your new raised forces", he wrote to the Rump Parliament, "did perform singular good service, for which they deserve a very high estimation and acknowledgement". The New England preacher Hugh Peters gave the militia a rousing farewell sermon "when their wives and children should ask them where they had been and what news, they should say they had been at Worcester, where England's sorrows began, and where they were happily ended", referring to the first clash of the Royalist and Parliamentarian Armies at the Battle of Powick Bridge on 23 September 1642, almost exactly nine years before.

Prior to the battle, King Charles II contracted the Worcester Clothiers Company to outfit his army with uniforms but was unable to pay the £453.3s bill. In June 2008, King Charles III, (A Prince at the time) paid off the 357-year-old debt (less the interest, which would have amounted to around £47,500).

== Battle analysis ==
Cromwell's plan of battle divided his army into three parts, each part having a specific target: Colonel Robert Lilburne from Lancashire and Major Mercer with the Worcestershire horse were to secure Bewdley Bridge on the enemy's line of retreat. Lambert and Fleetwood were to force their way across the Teme and attack St John's, the western suburb of Worcester. Cromwell himself and the main army were to attack the town itself.

This plan was executed, and was the prototype of the Battle of Sedan. (Note: According to C.F. Atkinson, the author of the Encyclopædia Britannica Eleventh Edition article on the Civil War, and German critic, Fritz Hoenig. The same point had been made by the British military historian Sir John William Fortescue.) Worcester resembled Sedan in much more than outward form. Both were fought by "nations in arms", by citizen soldiers who had their hearts in the struggle, and could be trusted not only to fight their hardest but to march their best. Only with such troops would a general dare to place a deep river between the two halves of his army or to send away detachments beforehand to reap the fruits of victory, in certain anticipation of winning the victory with the remainder. The result was, in brief, one of those rare victories in which a pursuit is superfluous.

== Legacy ==
134 years later, in early April 1786, John Adams and Thomas Jefferson visited Fort Royal Hill at the battlefield at Worcester. John Adams wrote that he was "deeply moved" but disappointed at the locals' lack of knowledge of the battle, and gave the townspeople an "impromptu lecture",

The people in the neighborhood appeared so ignorant and careless at Worcester that I was provoked and asked "And do Englishmen so soon forget the ground where liberty was fought for? Tell your neighbors and your children that this is holy ground, much holier than that on which your churches stand. All England should come in pilgrimage to this hill, once a year".

== See also ==
- Siege of Worcester
- Third English Civil War
- Wars of the Three Kingdoms
- The Proscribed Royalist, 1651 (painting)
