= George Monck, 1st Duke of Albemarle =

English military officer and politician (1608–1670)

His Grace The Duke of Albemarle KG PC JP
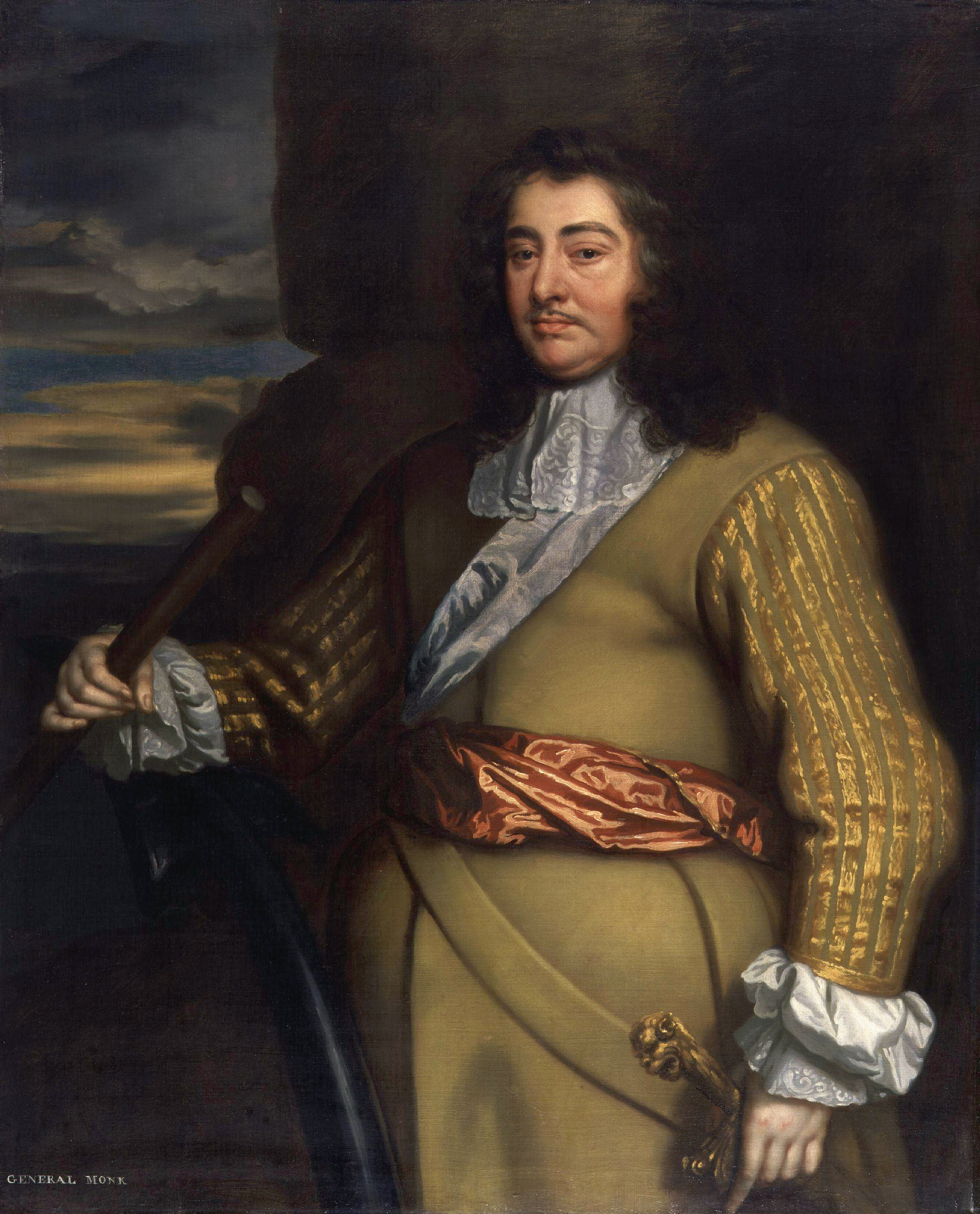
- Portrait by Sir Peter Lely, 1665–1666

Lord High Treasurer
- In office June 1667 – January 1670

Lord Lieutenant of Middlesex
- In office 1662–1670

Custos Rotulorum & Lord Lieutenant of Devon
- In office July 1660 – January 1670

Lord Deputy of Ireland
- In office June 1660 – February 1662

Member of Parliament for Devon
- In office April 1660 – July 1660

Commander-in-Chief Scotland
- In office April 1654 – February 1660

General at sea
- In office 1652–1653

Personal details
- Born: 6 December 1608 Potheridge, Devon, England
- Died: 3 January 1670 (aged 61) Potheridge, Devon, England
- Resting place: Westminster Abbey
- Spouse: Anne Clarges (1653–his death)
- Children: Christopher Monck, 2nd Duke of Albemarle
- Occupation: Professional soldier and naval officer

Military service
- Rank: Captain general
- Battles/wars: Anglo-Spanish War (1625–1630); Cádiz expedition (1625); Anglo-French War (1627–1629); St Martin-de-Ré; Eighty Years' War; Maastricht; Breda; Wars of the Three Kingdoms; Newburn; New Ross; Nantwich; Dunbar; Dundee; First Anglo-Dutch War; Portland; The Gabbard; Scheveningen; Glencairn's rising; Second Anglo-Dutch War; Four Days' Battle; St. James's Day Battle

George Monck, 1st Duke of Albemarle (6 December 1608 – 3 January 1670) was a professional soldier from Devon who fought on both sides during the Wars of the Three Kingdoms. A prominent military figure under the Commonwealth, his support was crucial to the 1660 Stuart Restoration of Charles II.

Monck began his military career in 1625 and served in the Eighty Years' War until 1638, when he returned to England. Posted to Ireland as part of the army sent to suppress the Irish Rebellion of 1641, he quickly gained a reputation for efficiency and ruthlessness. After Charles I agreed to a truce with the Catholic Confederacy in September 1643, he was captured fighting for the Royalists at Nantwich in January 1644 and remained a prisoner for the next two years.

Released in 1647, he was named Parliamentarian commander in Eastern Ulster, fought in Scotland under Oliver Cromwell in the 1650 to 1652 Anglo-Scottish War, and served as General at sea during the 1652 to 1654 First Anglo-Dutch War. From 1655 to 1660, he was army commander in Scotland, and his support for moderates in Parliament who wanted to restore the monarchy proved decisive in Charles II regaining his throne in May 1660.

Monck was rewarded by being made Duke of Albemarle and given various senior positions. Illness and lack of interest in politics meant he faded into the background after 1660, but returned to sea during the Second Anglo-Dutch War. He played an important leadership role during the 1665 Great Plague of London, as well as the 1666 Great Fire of London, and died in January 1670.

== Personal details ==
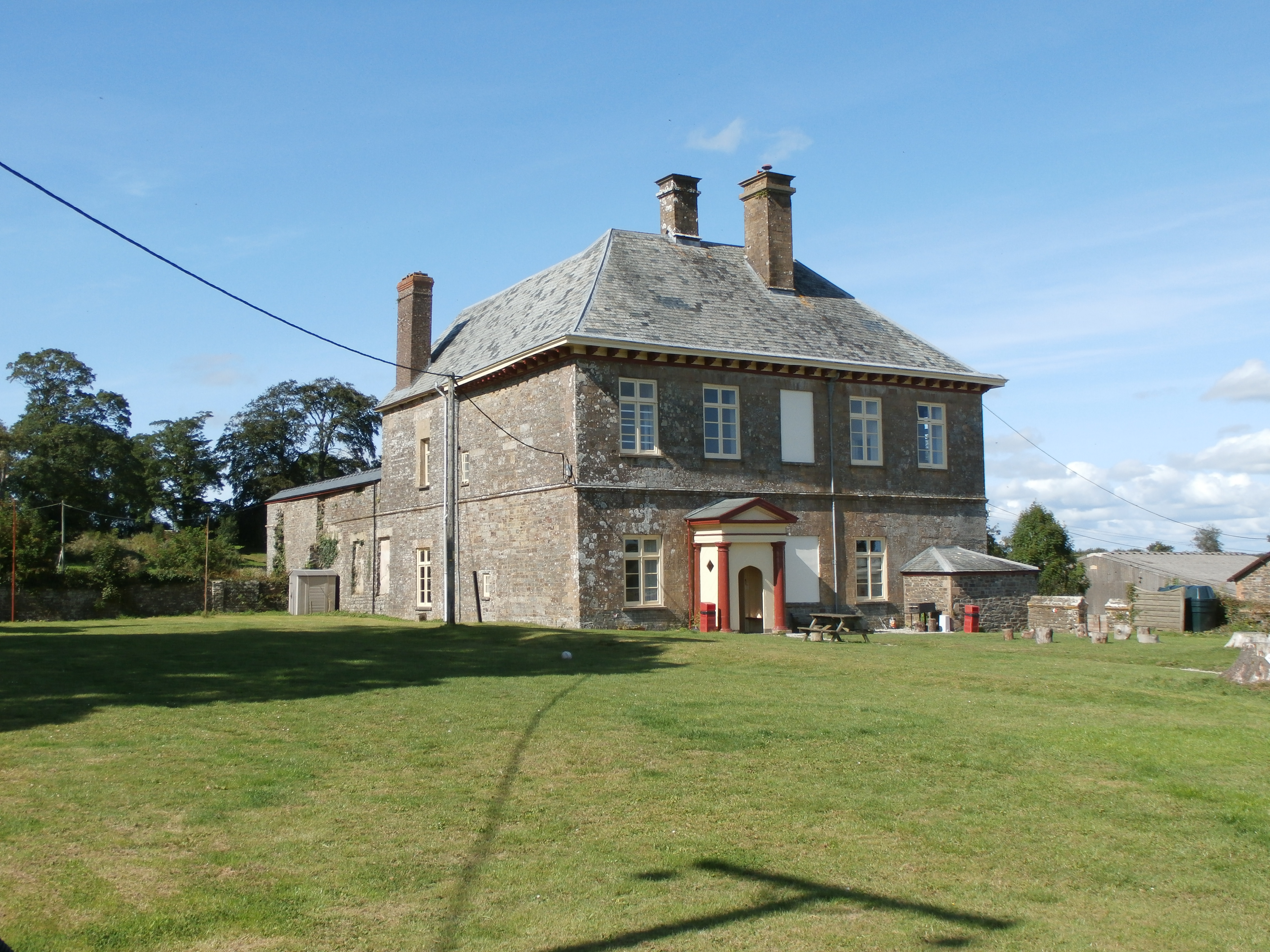
Great Potheridge in 2014, the surviving wing of Monck's family home

Monck was born 6 December 1608 on the family estate of Potheridge in Devon, second son of Sir Thomas Monck (1570–1627) and Elizabeth Smith, whose father Sir George Smith was reputedly the richest man in Exeter, and three times Mayor. Monck's younger brother Nicholas (1609–1661) became Bishop of Hereford and Provost of Eton College, while his elder brother Thomas died in 1647. Monck was a descendant of Arthur Plantagenet, 1st Viscount Lisle, due to a marriage between Thomas Monke and Frances Plantagenet, and thus also an illegitimate cognatic descendant of Edward IV.

Despite being one of the oldest families in Devon, the Moncks were relatively poor, while Smith allegedly failed to pay his daughter's dowry, leading to a series of expensive legal disputes with his son-in-law. In 1625, Sir Thomas was imprisoned for debt and died in jail two years later.

In January 1653, Monck married Anne Clarges (1619–1670), daughter of a London farrier and widow of Thomas Radford, whose death was not legally confirmed until a year after their marriage, a fact later used against her. Anne allegedly had strong Royalist sympathies like her brother Thomas (1618–1695), who was knighted after the Stuart Restoration and had a long career in Parliament. They had one son who survived into adulthood, Christopher Monck, 2nd Duke of Albemarle (1653–1688).

== Early career, pre-1641 ==
Monck became a professional soldier, a common career choice for younger sons of impoverished gentry. His first experience was the failed attack on Cádiz in November 1625, when he served as an ensign in a company commanded by his cousin Sir Richard Grenville. He later joined the equally disastrous expedition against St Martin-de-Ré in July 1627; it is suggested one reason for doing so was his arrest for attempted murder in late 1626, when he and his brother Thomas assaulted Nicholas Battyn, the undersheriff responsible for jailing their father.

He spent most of the next decade serving in the Dutch States Army, which was then considered the best place to learn the 'art of war' due to its success in the Eighty Years' War against Spain. Many officers who later fought on both sides during the Wars of the Three Kingdoms did the same, among them Sir Thomas Fairfax and Sir Philip Skippon. During the capture of Maastricht in 1632, he served in a regiment commanded by the Earl of Oxford, who was killed in the final assault and replaced by George Goring. By 1637, Monck was lieutenant colonel under Goring and played a decisive role in storming Breda, a Dutch success which was one of the last major actions of the war. After quarrelling with the civil authorities of Dordrecht, he surrendered his commission and returned to England in 1638.

During the 1639 and 1640 Bishops' Wars, he was lieutenant colonel in a regiment raised by Mountjoy Blount, 1st Earl of Newport, who was also Master-General of the Ordnance. Monck was one of the few to emerge with any credit from the Battle of Newburn in 1640, when he saved the English artillery from capture. Lack of money meant the army was dissolved. Monck spent the next year unemployed.

== Ireland and England, 1641–1646 ==
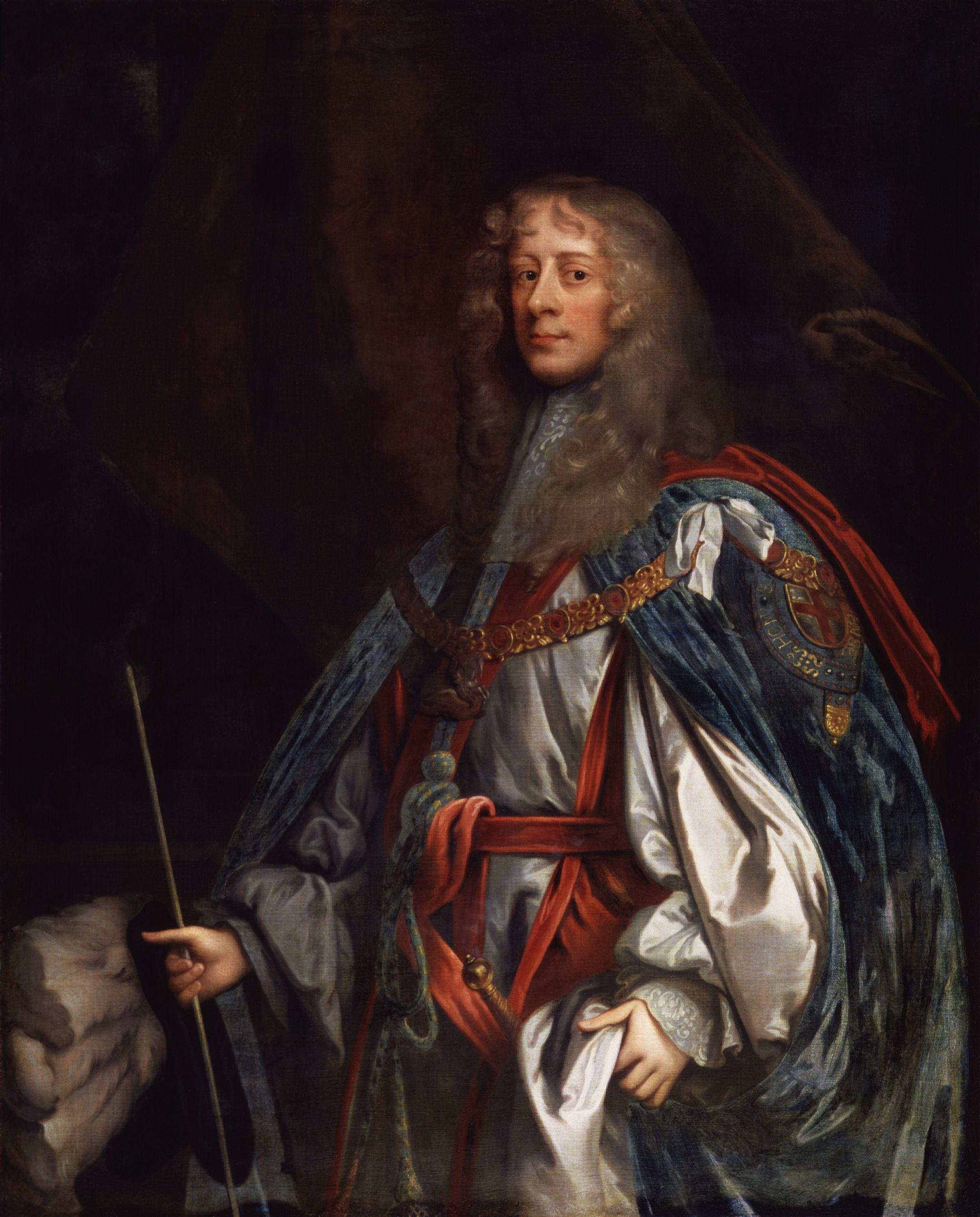
The Earl of Ormond, Royalist commander who dominated Irish politics for much of the 17th century

Following the Irish Rebellion of 1641, Parliament approved the recruitment of a Royal Army to suppress it. Monck was made colonel of a regiment raised by his distant relative Robert Sidney, 2nd Earl of Leicester, which landed in Dublin in January 1642 and served under the Earl of Ormond. Over the next eighteen months, he campaigned against rebel strongholds in Leinster, during which he was responsible for several alleged massacres in County Kildare and also took part in the March 1643 Battle of New Ross. However, the outbreak of the First English Civil War in August 1642 meant Ormonde could no longer receive reinforcements or money from England, and by mid-1643, the Catholic Confederacy controlled most of Ireland, with the exception of Ulster, Dublin and Cork City.

Most of Ormond's officers, including Monck, argued the Irish Army should remain neutral between Parliamentarians and Royalists but Charles was anxious to use these troops to help him win the war in England and in September 1643, Ormonde agreed a truce or "Cessation" with the Confederacy. Factions on both sides objected to the terms, which included negotiations on freedom of worship for Catholics and constitutional reforms. Protestants saw this as a threat, while many Confederates felt they were on the verge of victory and gained nothing from the truce; they were also well aware any concessions Charles made to Catholics in Ireland undermined his position in England and Scotland.

Monck was among those who refused to swear allegiance to the king and was sent by Ormonde as a prisoner to Bristol, where he eventually agreed to support the Royalists before being captured at Nantwich in January 1644. Although prisoners were commonly exchanged, his experience and ability were so highly regarded that he remained in custody for the next two years, during which he wrote a military manual entitled Observations on Military and Political Affairs. Following Charles's surrender in May 1646, he accepted an appointment in one of the regiments sent to Ireland by Parliament as reinforcements; in September 1647, he was appointed Parliamentarian commander in Eastern Ulster.

== The Interregnum ==
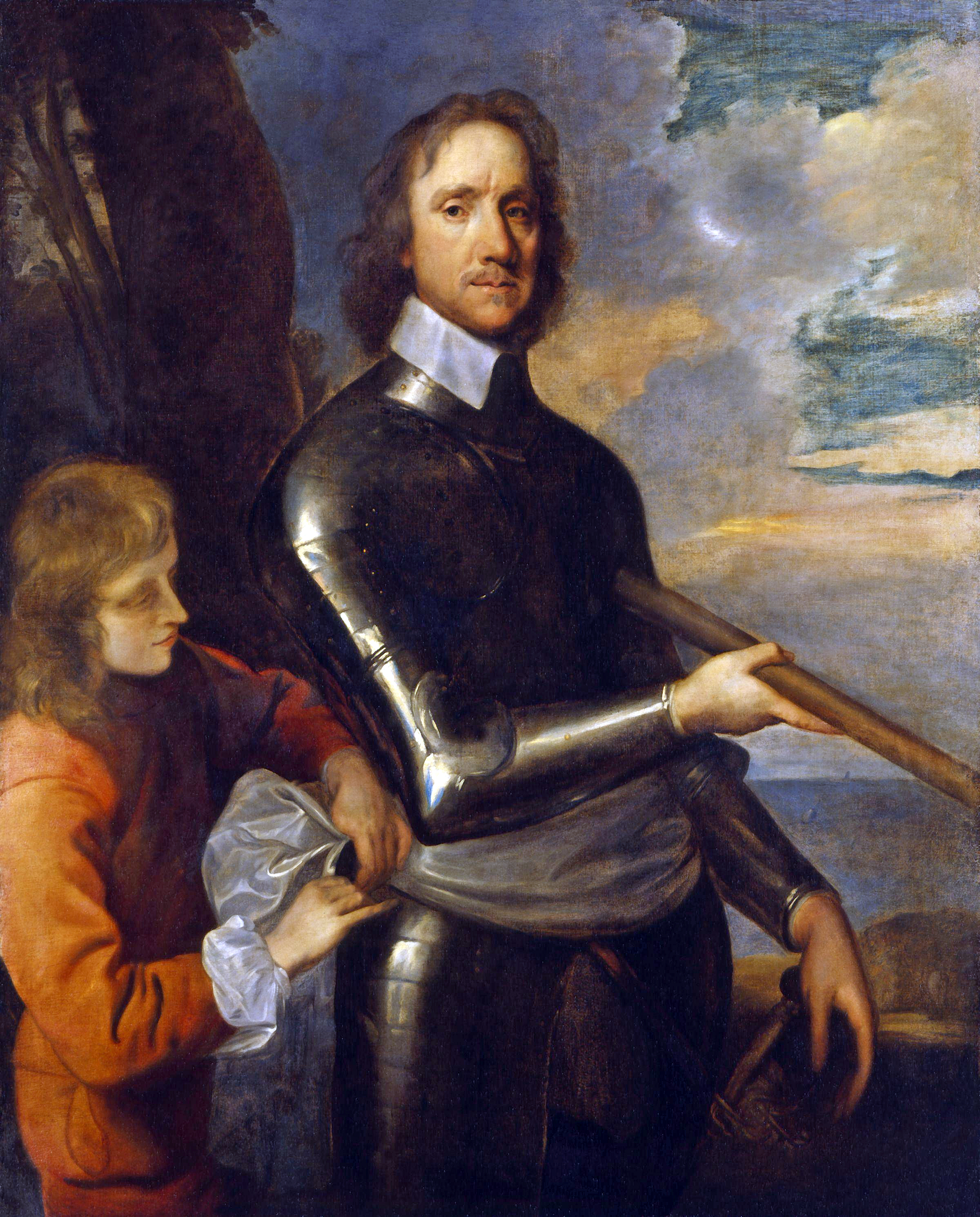
Portrait of Oliver Cromwell by Robert Walker, 1649. Monck's support for the Protectorate was based on his personal regard for its leader.

Monck proved his loyalty to Parliament by refusing to take part in the Second English Civil War and requiring all his officers to sign a declaration of support. However, his position in Ulster became extremely precarious following the execution of Charles I in January 1649, since it was dominated by Scots Presbyterian settlers, supported by a Covenanter army under Robert Monro. The Scots did not only object to the English killing their king without consultation, but as Calvinists, they viewed monarchy as divinely ordained, making the execution sacrilegious. As a result, they defected to the Royalist–Confederate alliance led by Ormond and in desperation, Monck agreed to a secret truce with Eoghan Ó Néill, the Catholic leader in Ulster, which he did not communicate to Parliament until May.

Recalled to London, he was reprimanded by a Parliamentary committee, although they privately recognised the desperate circumstances which made it necessary. Although some mistrusted Monck as a former Royalist, Oliver Cromwell gave him command of a regiment in the 1650 to 1651 Anglo-Scottish War, which fought at Dunbar, then stormed Dundee, an action in which 800 civilians were allegedly killed. Throughout the Protectorate, Monck remained loyal to Cromwell, who appointed him military commander in Scotland until February 1652. At that time, Monck became seriously ill and retired to Bath in order to recover. Due to his expertise in utilising artillery, when the First Anglo-Dutch War began in November, Monck was made a General at Sea, along with Robert Blake and Richard Deane. He fought in the 1653 naval battles of Portland, the Gabbard and Scheveningen.

In April 1653, Cromwell dissolved the Rump Parliament and in June Monck was nominated MP for Devon in Barebone's Parliament. Although the Dutch war did not formally end until the February 1654 Treaty of Westminster, Monck was recalled and sent to Scotland to suppress the Royalist Glencairn's rising. Appointed military commander, he employed the ruthless tactics demonstrated in his previous assignments and by the end of 1655 the country had been pacified. He retained this position for the next five years, demonstrating his loyalty by removing any officers who expressed opposition to government policy and arresting religious dissidents.

== The Restoration ==
When Oliver Cromwell died in September 1658, Monck transferred his support to his son Richard, who was appointed Lord Protector. The Third Protectorate Parliament elected in January 1659 was dominated by moderate Presbyterians like Monck and Royalist sympathisers, whose main objective was to reduce the power and expense of the military. In April, army radicals led by John Lambert and Charles Fleetwood dissolved Parliament and forced the resignation of Richard Cromwell. Sometimes known as the Wallingford House party, the new regime abolished the Protectorate, reseated the Rump Parliament dismissed by Cromwell in 1653 and began removing officers and officials of suspect loyalty, including many of those serving in Scotland.

Monck was left in place largely because rumours of another Royalist rising made it preferable to retain him. Both his cousin John Grenville and brother Nicholas were connected with the Royalist underground and in July 1659, Nicholas brought him a personal appeal from Charles II, asking for his help and offering up to £100,000 per year for his assistance. When Booth's Uprising broke out in August 1659, Monck considered joining it but the revolt collapsed before he had time to commit himself. In October, the Wallingford House group dismissed the Rump before being forced to reinstate it in early December.

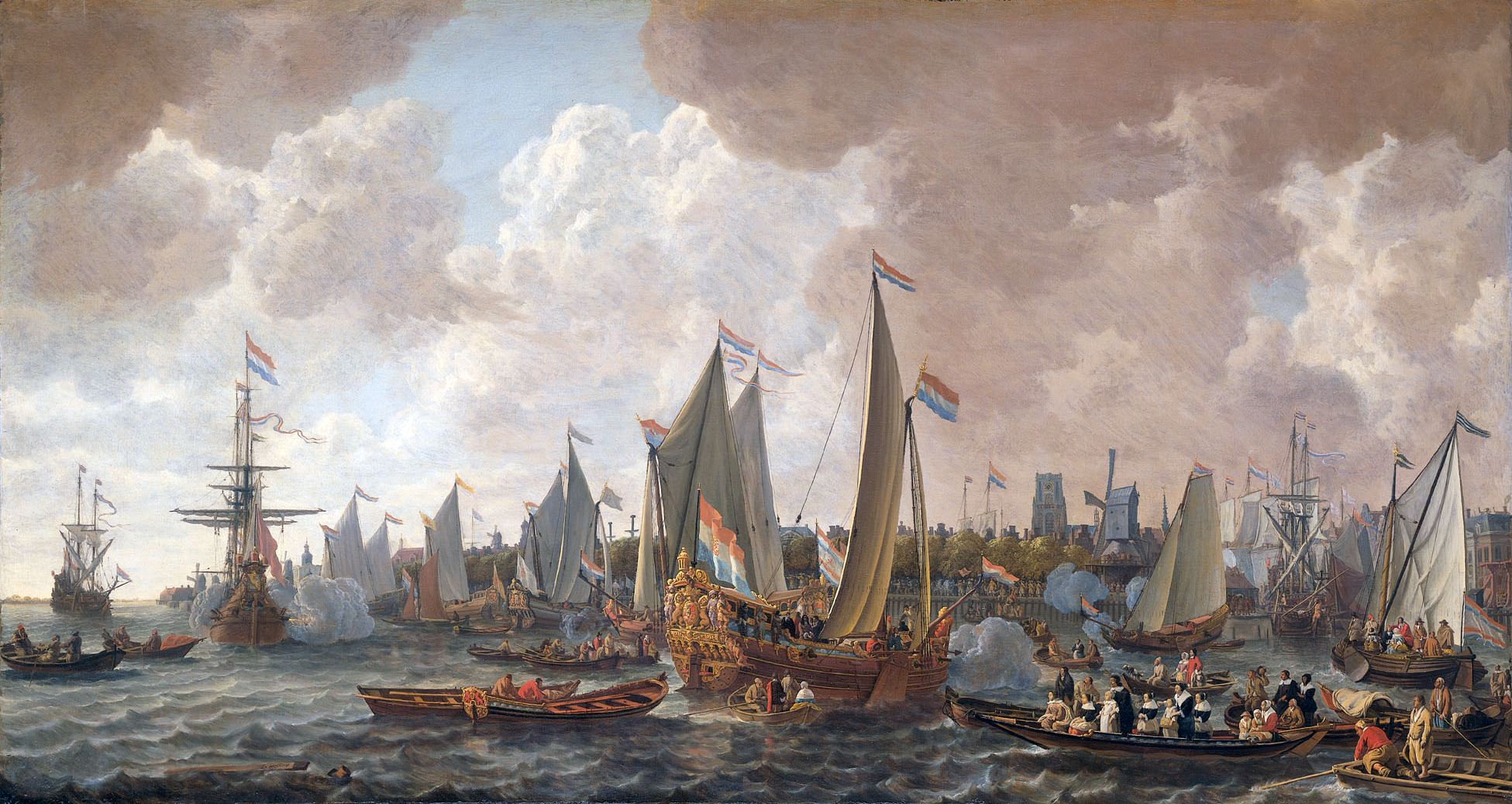
Charles leaves the Dutch Republic for England, 24 May 1660.

By the end of 1659, England appeared to be drifting into anarchy, with widespread demands for new elections and an end to military rule. Monck declared his support for the Rump against the Republican faction led by Lambert, while co-ordinating with Sir Theophilus Jones, a former colleague in Ireland who seized Dublin Castle in late December. At the same time, he marched his army to the English border, supported by a force raised by former New Model Army commander Sir Thomas Fairfax. Outnumbered and unpaid, Lambert's troops melted away; on 2 February Monck entered London and in April elections were held for a Convention Parliament.

While his backing was essential to the Stuart Restoration, modern historians question whether the policy was initiated by Monck as opposed to following majority opinion, which by now was overwhelmingly in favour of reinstating the monarchy. Although he was elected MP for Devon, observers noted that he had little interest in politics, while his lack of a regional power base in England and the proposed reduction of the army worked against his future influence. It has also been suggested the Royalist sympathies of his wife played an important role in his decision.

Regardless of his motives, the Declaration of Breda issued by Charles on 4 April 1660 was largely based on Monck's recommendations. It promised a general pardon for actions committed during the civil wars and Interregnum, with the exception of the regicides, retention by the current owners of property purchased during the same period, religious toleration and payment of arrears to the army. Based on these terms, Parliament resolved to proclaim Charles king and invited him to return to England; he left Holland on 24 May and entered London five days later.

== Later career and death ==
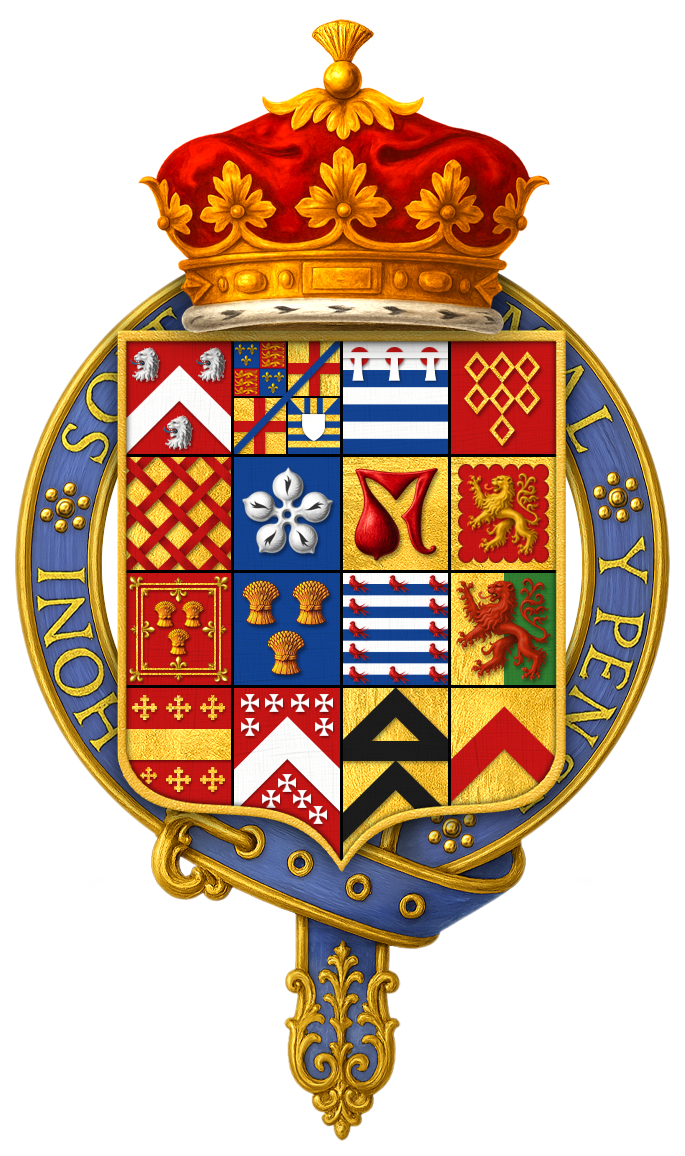
Quartered arms of George Monck, 1st Duke of Albemarle

In July 1660, Monck was made Duke of Albemarle, appointed to the Privy Council, made Lord Deputy of Ireland and Lord Lieutenant of Devon. He was also given the former Palace of Beaulieu, along with lands in Ireland and England worth £7,000 per year and an annual pension of £700. Among his friends and relatives, John Grenville became Earl of Bath, while Nicholas Monck was appointed Bishop of Hereford, his cousin William Morice Secretary of State for the Northern Department and his brother-in-law Thomas Commissary General of Musters.

When Monck fell seriously ill once again in August 1661, he was replaced in Ireland by Ormond, and compensated with the additional office of Lord Lieutenant of Middlesex. Thereafter he avoided front-line politics and focused on maximising his personal wealth, his wife becoming notorious for selling offices, although this was a common practice and probably reflected resentment at her humble origins. In his diary, Samuel Pepys attacks her as a "homely, plain dowd" and "filthy woman", although his views were almost certainly coloured by the rivalry between Monck and his own cousin Edward Montagu, 1st Earl of Sandwich, for control of the Admiralty.

In 1663, Monck was allocated lands in the Province of Carolina, now the modern US states of South and North Carolina, whose Albemarle Sound is named after him. He was also made a shareholder in the Royal African Company, established to challenge Dutch control of the Atlantic slave trade and a major factor in the commercial tensions between the two countries that eventually led to the Second Anglo-Dutch War in 1665. The conflict was backed by Monck and other investors within the government, including George Carteret, Shaftesbury and Arlington.

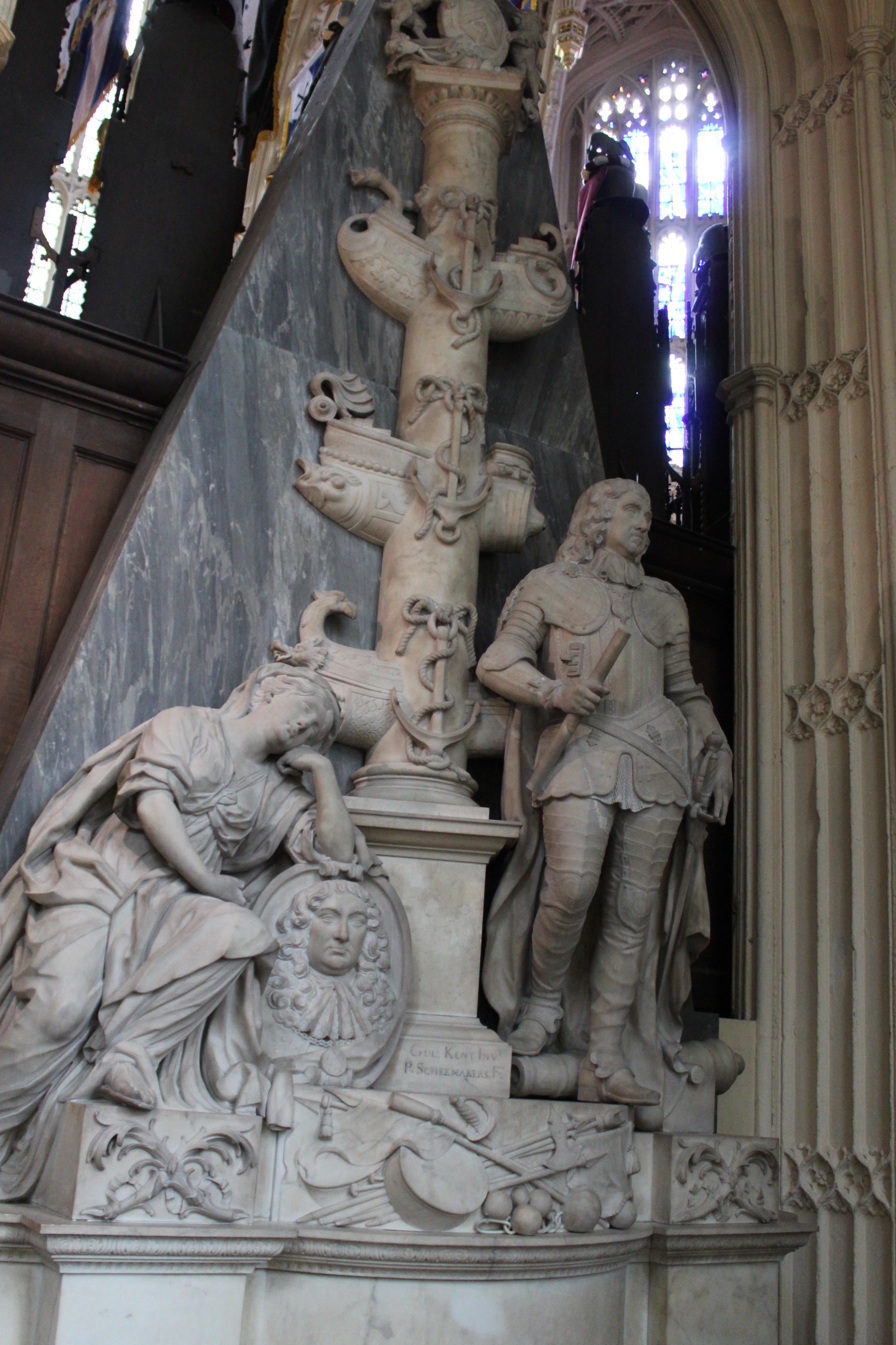
Monument to Monck in Westminster Abbey

Command of the fleet was given to James, Duke of York, with Sandwich as his deputy and Monck took over his administrative duties at the Admiralty. He also gained a great deal of popularity for remaining in London throughout the 1665 Great Plague when most of the government fled to Oxford. Monck and Prince Rupert shared command during the 1666 campaign; the Four Days' Battle in June was a Dutch victory, offset by English success at the St. James's Day Battle in July. In September he was recalled to help maintain order in the chaos created by the Great Fire of London.

This was his last active command; the fleet had to be laid up due to lack of money, culminating in the humiliating raid on the Medway in June 1667 which ended the war. One of the few to escape censure by Parliament, Monck was appointed First Lord of the Treasury but he was now suffering from severe oedema which limited his ability to attend meetings. He died on 3 January 1670, followed three weeks later by his wife, and was buried in Westminster Abbey. Some years later, a monument by William Kent and Peter Scheemakers was erected in the Abbey in Monck's honour. The ballad "On the Death of His Grace, the Duke of Albemarle" was composed in his honour.

== Sources ==
- Allen, David (1979). "From George Monck to the Duke of Albemarle: His Contribution to Charles II's Government, 1660–1670". Biography. 2 (2): 95–124. doi:10.1353/bio.2010.0843. JSTOR 23539339. S2CID 159829412.
- BCW. "The Cessation of Arms". BCW Project.
- Clavin, Terry (2009). Monck, George, in Dictionary of Irish Biography.
- Dunthorne, Hugh (2017). From Revolt to Riches: Culture and History of the Low Countries, 1500–1700. UCL Press.
- General George Monck's Regiment. "General George Monck's Regiment of Foot". BCW Project. Archived from the original on 9 May 2021.
- Harris, Tim (2006). Restoration; Charles II and his kingdoms. Penguin.
- Helms, MW; Naylor, Leonard (1983). Clarges, Thomas (c. 1618–95), of Westminster and Stoke Poges, Bucks. in 'The History of Parliament: the House of Commons 1660–1690'. Brewer & Boydell.
- Helms, MW; Ferris, John (1983). Monck, George (1608–70), of Potheridge, Merton, Devon in 'The History of Parliament: the House of Commons 1660–1690'. Brewer & Boydell.
- Hunneyball, Paul (2010). Monck, Sir Thomas (1570–1627), of Potheridge, nr. Merton, Devon in 'The History of Parliament: the House of Commons 1604–1629'. Cambridge University Press.
- Hutton, Ronald (2004). "Monck, George, first duke of Albemarle (1608–1670)". Oxford Dictionary of National Biography (online ed.). Oxford University Press. doi:10.1093/ref:odnb/18939. (Subscription, Wikipedia Library access or UK public library membership required.)
- Hutton, Ronald (1989). Charles II: King of England, Scotland, and Ireland. Clarendon Press. ISBN 0198229119.
- Jordan, Don; Walsh, Michael (2012). The King's Revenge; Charles II and the Greatest Manhunt in British History. Little, Brown. ISBN 978-1408703281.
- Keay, Anna (2022). "The Maid Who Restored Charles II". History Today. 72 (4).
- Macleod, Donald (Autumn 2009). "The influence of Calvinism on politics" (PDF). Theology in Scotland. XVI (2).
- Royle, Trevor (2006) [2004]. Civil War: The Wars of the Three Kingdoms 1638–1660. Abacus. ISBN 978-0349115641.
- Scott, David (2003). Politics and War in the Three Stuart Kingdoms, 1637–49. Palgrave. ISBN 978-0333658741.
- Sharp, David (2000). England in Crisis, 1640–60. Heinemann. ISBN 978-0435327149.
- Sherman, Arnold A (1976). "Pressure from Leadenhall: The East India Company Lobby, 1660–1678". The Business History Review. 50 (3): 329–355. doi:10.2307/3112999. JSTOR 3112999. S2CID 154564220.
- Stoyle, Mark (1993). "The Honour of General Monck". History Today. 43 (8).
- Wedgwood, CV (2001) [1958]. The King's War, 1641–1647. Penguin Classics. ISBN 978-0141390727.
- Westminster Abbey. "George and Nicholas Monck". Westminster Abbey burials.
- Worden, Blair (2010). "Oliver Cromwell and the Protectorate". Transactions of the Royal Historical Society. 20: 57–83. doi:10.1017/S0080440110000058. JSTOR 41432386. S2CID 159710210.
- Yerby, George; Hunneyball, Paul (2010). Smith, George (d. 1619), of Madford House, Exeter, Devon in 'The History of Parliament: the House of Commons 1604–1629'. Cambridge University Press.

Military offices
New regiment	Colonel of the Duke of Albemarle's Regiment of Foot; 1650–1670	Succeeded by The Earl of Craven
Vacant Title last held by Oliver Cromwell	Commander-in-Chief of the Forces; 1660–1670	Succeeded by James Scott
Honorary titles
Vacant English Interregnum Title last held by Duke of Bedford	Lord Lieutenant of Devon; 1660–1670	Succeeded by The Earl of Bath
Vacant English Interregnum Title last held by Duke of Bedford	Custos Rotulorum of Devon; 1660–1670	Succeeded by The Earl of Bath
Preceded by The Earl of Dorset; The Earl of Berkshire	Lord Lieutenant of Middlesex; 1662–1670	Succeeded by The Earl of Craven
Political offices
Preceded by Edmund Ludlow (Lord Deputy)	Lord Lieutenant of Ireland; 1660–1662	Succeeded by The Duke of Ormonde
Preceded by Prince Rupert of the Rhine	Master of the Horse; 1660–1668	Succeeded by The Duke of Buckingham
Preceded by The Earl of Southampton (Lord High Treasurer)	First Lord of the Treasury; 1667–1670	Succeeded by The Lord Clifford of Chudleigh (Lord High Treasurer)
Peerage of England
New creation	Duke of Albemarle; 2nd creation 1660–1670	Succeeded by Christopher Monck
