= Proscription =

Public identification and official condemnation of enemies of the state

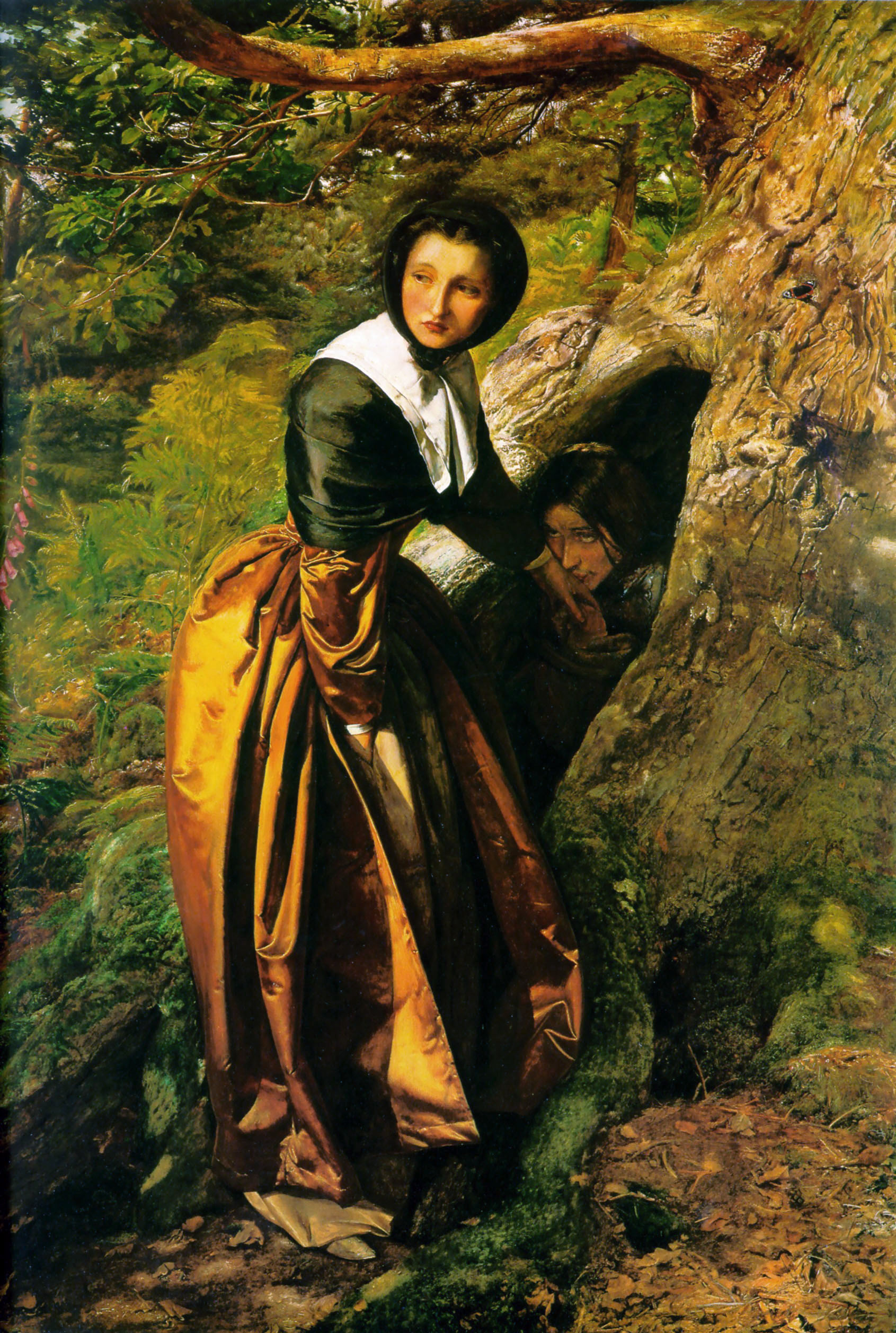
The Proscribed Royalist, 1651, painted by John Everett Millais c. 1853, in which a Puritan woman hides a fleeing Royalist proscript in the hollow of a tree

Proscription (Latin: proscriptio) is, in current usage, a 'decree of condemnation to death or banishment' (Oxford English Dictionary) and can be used in a political context to refer to state-approved murder or banishment. The term originated in ancient Rome, where it included public identification and official condemnation of declared enemies of the state and it often involved confiscation of property.

Its usage has been significantly widened to describe governmental and political sanctions of varying severity on individuals and classes of people who have fallen into disfavor, from the en masse suppression of adherents of unorthodox ideologies to the suppression of political rivals or personal enemies. In addition to its recurrences during the various phases of the Roman Republic, it has become a standard term to label:

- Sulla's proscription – a reprisal campaign by the Roman proconsul and later dictator, Lucius Cornelius Sulla, to eliminate the supporters of his rival Marius in the aftermath of his victory in the civil war of 83–82 BC.
- Proscription of the Second Triumvirate – an agreement between the triumvirs Octavian Caesar, Marcus Antonius, and Marcus Lepidus to avenge Julius Caesar's assassination, eliminate political enemies, and acquire their properties
- The suppression of Royalists after Oliver Cromwell's decisive defeat of Charles II at the Battle of Worcester in 1651 (see image)
- The curbing of Western religion in early 18th-century China
- The banning of Highland dress following the Jacobite rising of 1745 in Scotland
- Atrocities that occurred during the Reign of Terror (1793–1796) phase of the French Revolution
- The mass deportations of British and French workers from Russia in the mid-19th century, with the onset of the Crimean War
- In the 20th century, such things as the efforts of the Labour Party in the United Kingdom to prevent "Communist entryism" through blacklisting propagandizing persons and organisations
- The broad prohibitions of Jewish cultural institutions and activities in the Soviet Union after the birth of the state of Israel in 1948 and the onset of the 1948 Arab–Israeli War
- The banning of organisations considered terrorist—including the membership of and support for—in Ireland, particularly the Provisional IRA and the INLA in the 1970s.
- The proscription of Palestine Action by the UK government in 2025.

== See also ==
- Attainder
- Damnatio memoriae
- Enemy of the people
- Homo sacer
- Hostis humani generis
- Ostracism
- Outlaw
- Personae non gratae
- Purge
- Targeted killing
