= Cromwell Museum =

Museum in Huntingdon, England

Coordinates: 52.33071°N 0.18439°W

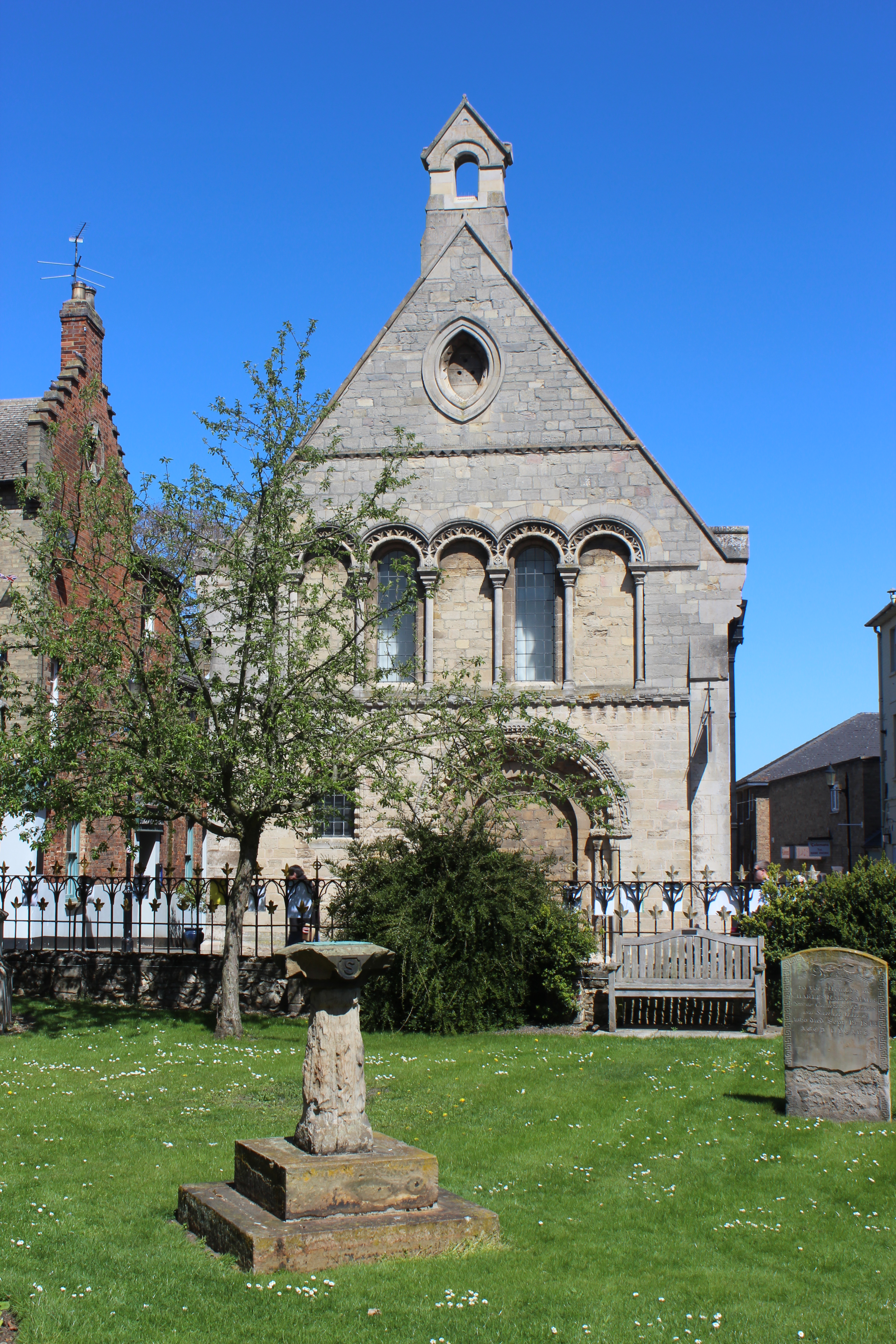
- The west front of the Cromwell Museum, Huntingdon. The building retains features from the medieval Hospital of St John's.
- Established: 1962
- Location: Huntingdon, Cambridgeshire
- Type: Biographical
- Curator: Stuart Orme
- Website: www.cromwellmuseum.org

The Cromwell Museum in Huntingdon, England, is a museum containing collections exploring the life of Oliver Cromwell and to a lesser extent his son Richard Cromwell. Oliver Cromwell was born in Huntingdon in 1599 and lived there for more than half his life. The museum is located in the former grammar school building in which Cromwell received his early education. Founded in 1962, the museum contains significant artefacts, paintings and printed material relating to The Protectorate. The museum is currently run as part of a trust dedicated to Oliver Cromwell's legacy and previously by the Cambridgeshire Libraries, Archives and Information Service, part of Cambridgeshire County Council.

== Building ==
The Cromwell Museum is housed in the old grammar school building attended by Cromwell and the diarist Samuel Pepys. The building retains fragments of the medieval infirmary hall of the Hospital of St John the Baptist (circa 1170–90). The hospital was an almshouse for the poor and was founded by David Earl of Huntingdon. Keeping to an Augustinian rule, the masters of the hospital were appointed by the mayor and burgesses of the town until the suppression of chantries and hospitals in 1547. Vested in the corporation of the town, the hospital building became Huntingdon Grammar School which remained in the building until moving to a new location in 1896, eventually moving to Hinchingbrooke House on the outskirts of the town.

The building was extensively modified and shortened during its time as a school. It was remodelled and partially rebuilt in 1863, and then heavily restored in 1878 under the direction of architect Robert Hutchinson at a cost of £900. The work was paid for by the dramatist Dion Boucicault in memory of his son, killed in the Abbots Ripton rail accident of 1876. The building had been encased in brick and when this was removed a blocked Romanesque doorway was discovered. Other features of the exterior include a bellcote, five decorative arches on its west front and two bays of the hall's nave and aisles. The building was a scheduled Ancient Monument, but was de-scheduled in 2003 following a review by English Heritage. It is a grade II* listed building.

Following a temporary exhibition held in Huntingdon in 1958 to mark the anniversary of Cromwell's death, Huntingdonshire County Council developed a collection to celebrate the town's most famous resident and it was decided that the vacant grammar school would be a suitable location for a museum dedicated to Cromwell. The Museum opened in 1962 after major internal re-decoration. Initially managed by Huntingdonshire County Council, from 1974 the Museum became the responsibility of the Cambridgeshire County Council library service. The Museum was completely re-displayed in 1988 and refurbished between November 2003 and late May 2004 when major building work was undertaken and temperature control systems installed.

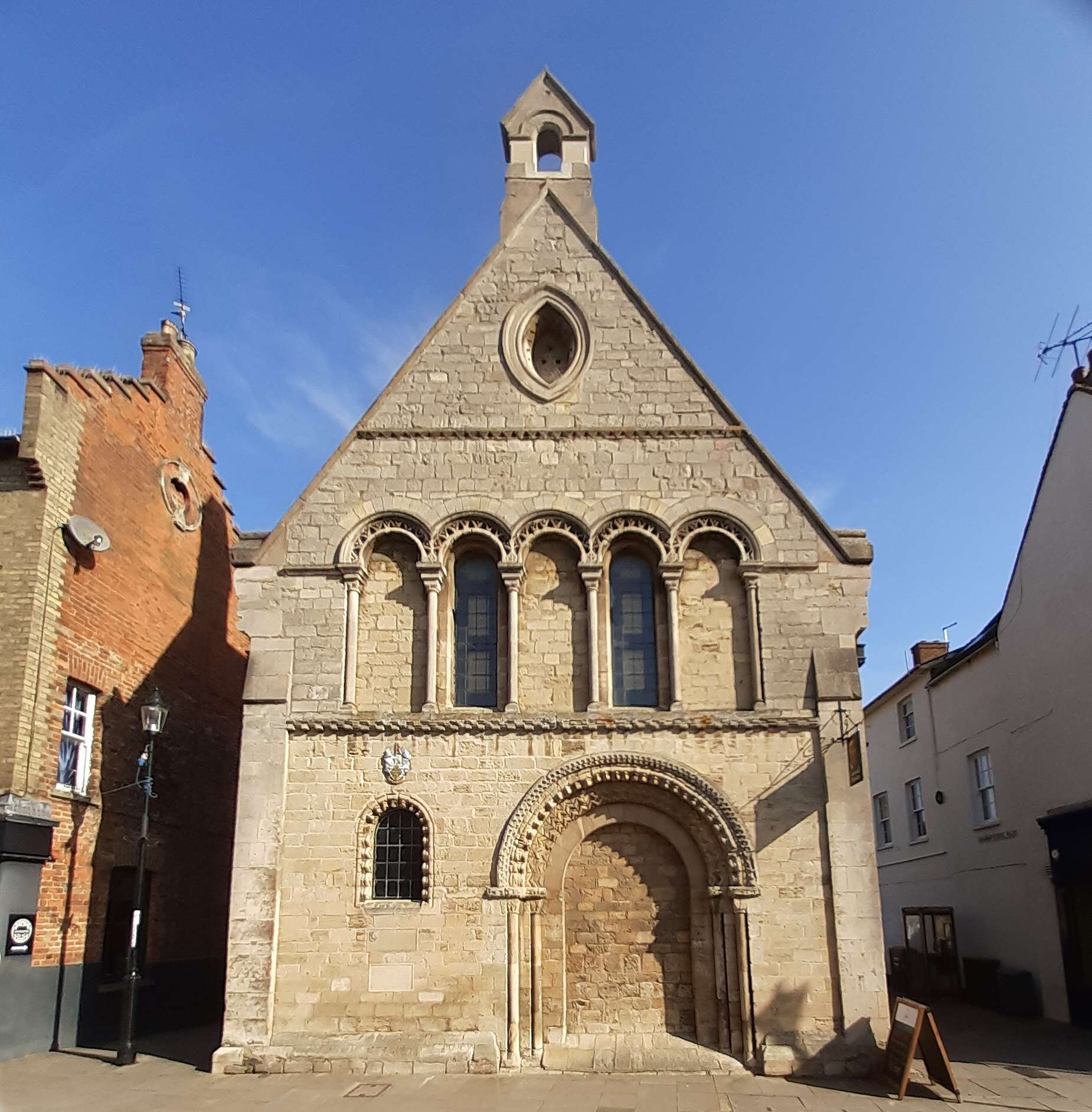
12th century face of the Cromwell Museum from the High Street

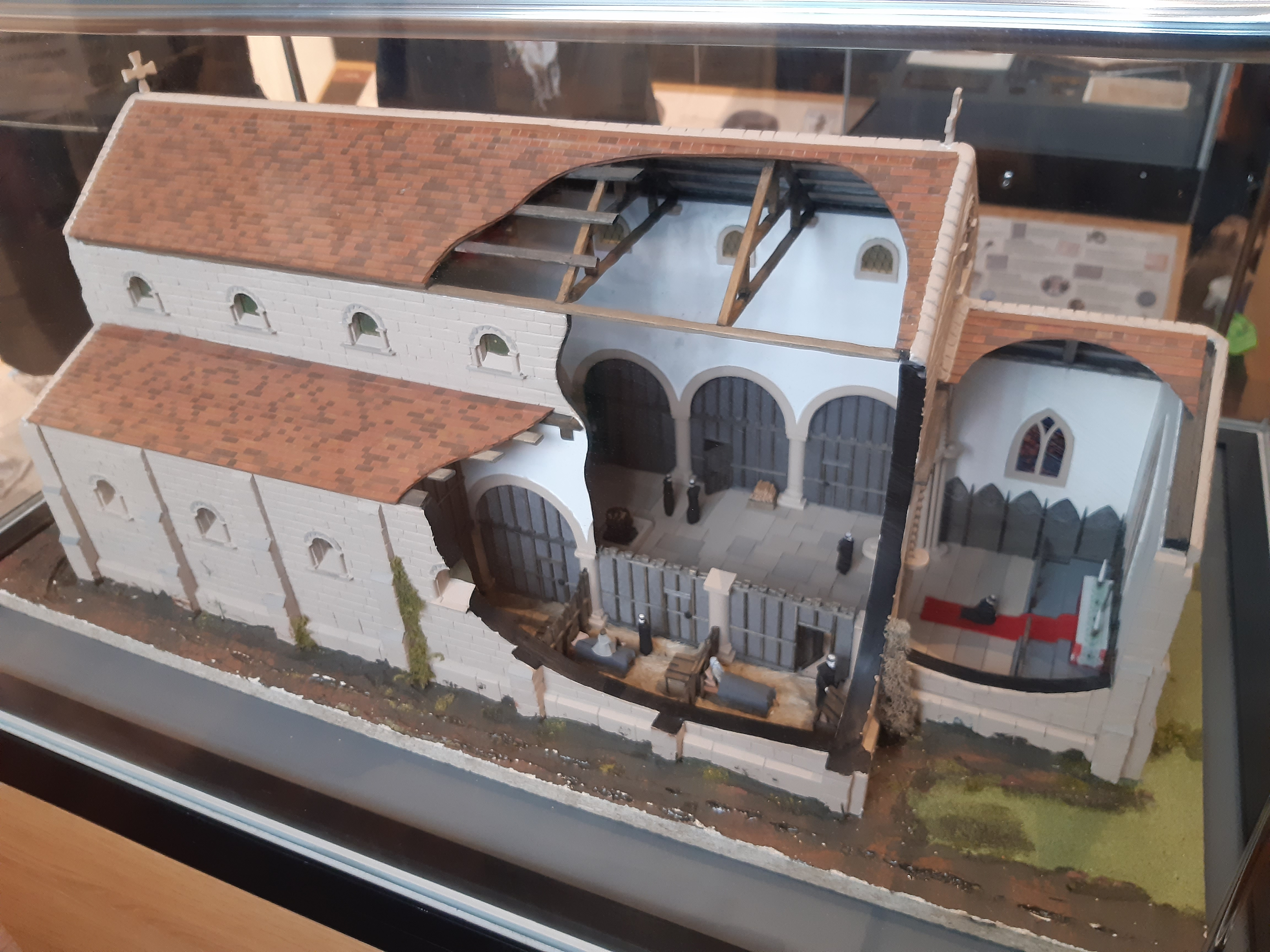
Model of spital that preceded the Grammar School. Arches support the nave, giving access to the now-demolished side buildings. Only the left-hand end of the nave (with two arched bays) survives.

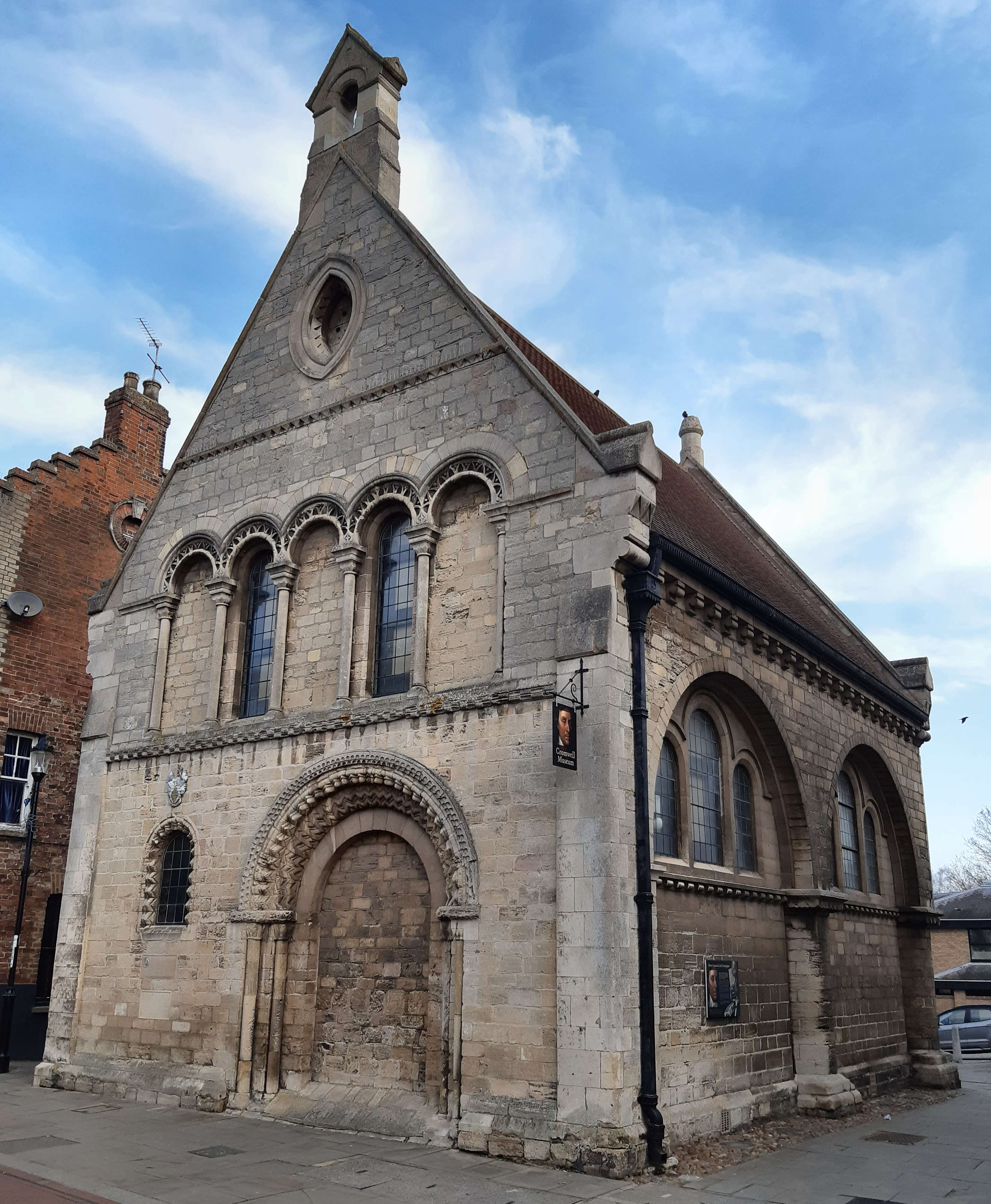
Corner view, showing infilled arches and doorway of the former monastic spital for reuse as Grammar School

== Collections ==
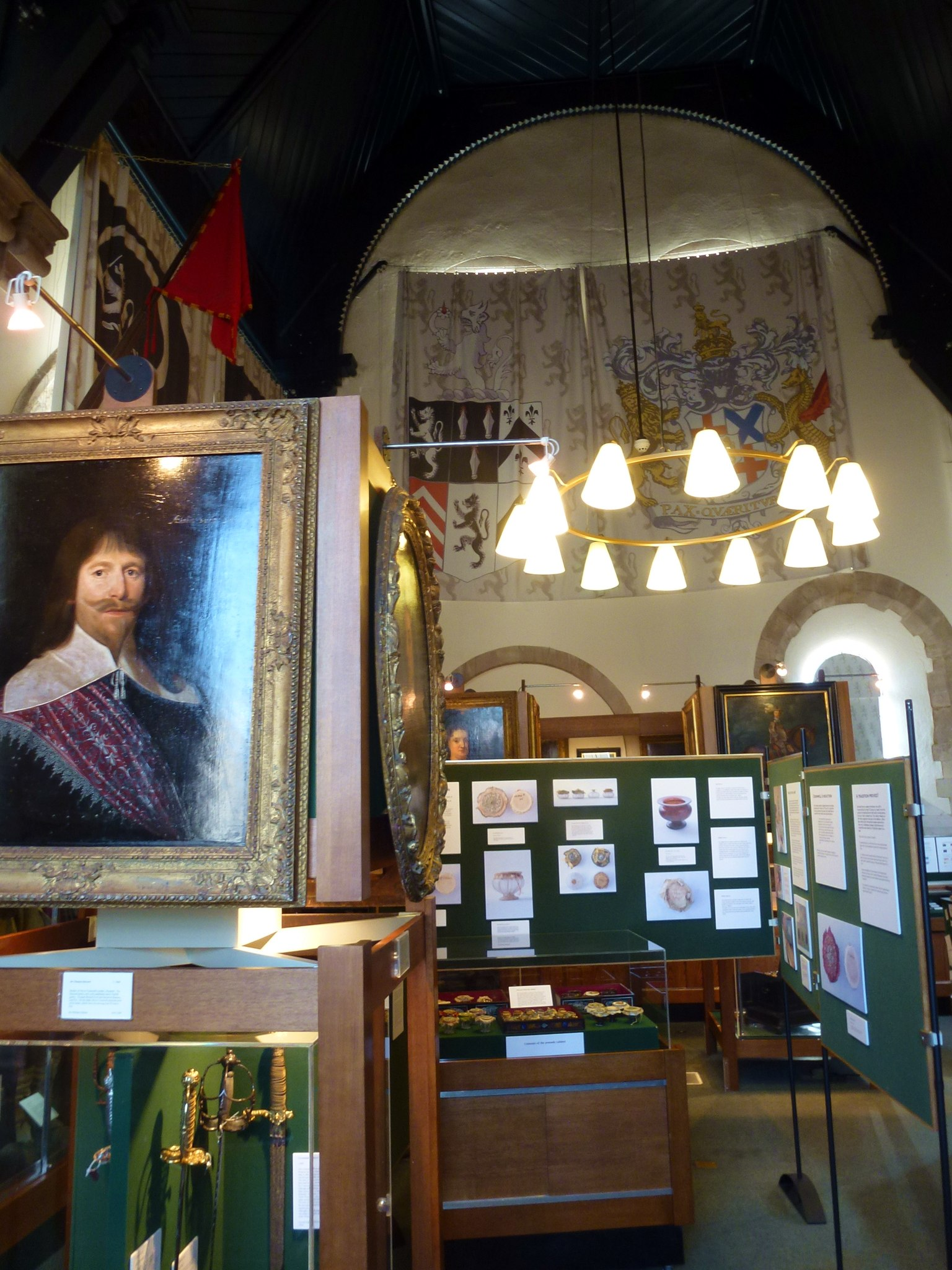
Interior

The Museum collection is the best collection of "Cromwelliana" in the UK, comprising approximately 610 individual items as of 2009. The museum owns approximately 70% of the items in its collection, with loan collections from the Bush family (descendants of Henry Cromwell, the fourth son of Oliver Cromwell), the Royal Armouries (who have loaned items of 17th-century military equipment) and objects from the Museum of London including the Tangye Collection.

The museum has a number of portraits of Cromwell and his family, including two by Robert Walker (d.1658), a copy of the famous "warts, and everything" portrait by Sir Peter Lely (1618-1680), a significant late portrait of Cromwell by Edward Mascall, and several miniatures in the style of Samuel Cooper. The museum has a number of coins from the era plus several portrait medals, including a copy of the Lord Protector medal also by Thomas Simon.

The Museum displays a unique group of objects and portraits passed down by the descendants of Henry Cromwell including the hat Cromwell is thought to have worn at the dissolution of the Long Parliament in 1653 and his personal powder flask for carrying gunpowder. The Museum also has on display an apothecary's cabinet owned by Cromwell, and a Florentine Cabinet presented to him by the Duke of Tuscany.

The majority of public documents relating to Cromwell's public life are held by The National Archives in Kew, but the museum holds a large collection of printed pamphlets and copies of key texts of the period, such as The Humble Petition & Advice of 1657, which clarified the organisation of Parliament and the duties of the office of Lord Protector. The Cromwell Collection is located in the nearby Huntingdon Library and Archive building and provides one of the most comprehensive collections of material on Oliver Cromwell and his times outside academic circles. The Collection is freely available and was created in 2002 with the help of a grant from the Wolfson British History Programme.

== Closure proposal ==
The museum was proposed for closure in the County Council's budget planning proposals for 2015–2016, with cited savings of £20,000 a year. On 1 April 2016 management of the museum passed from Cambridgeshire County Council to a charitable trust.
