= The Proscribed Royalist, 1651 =

Painting by John Everett Millais

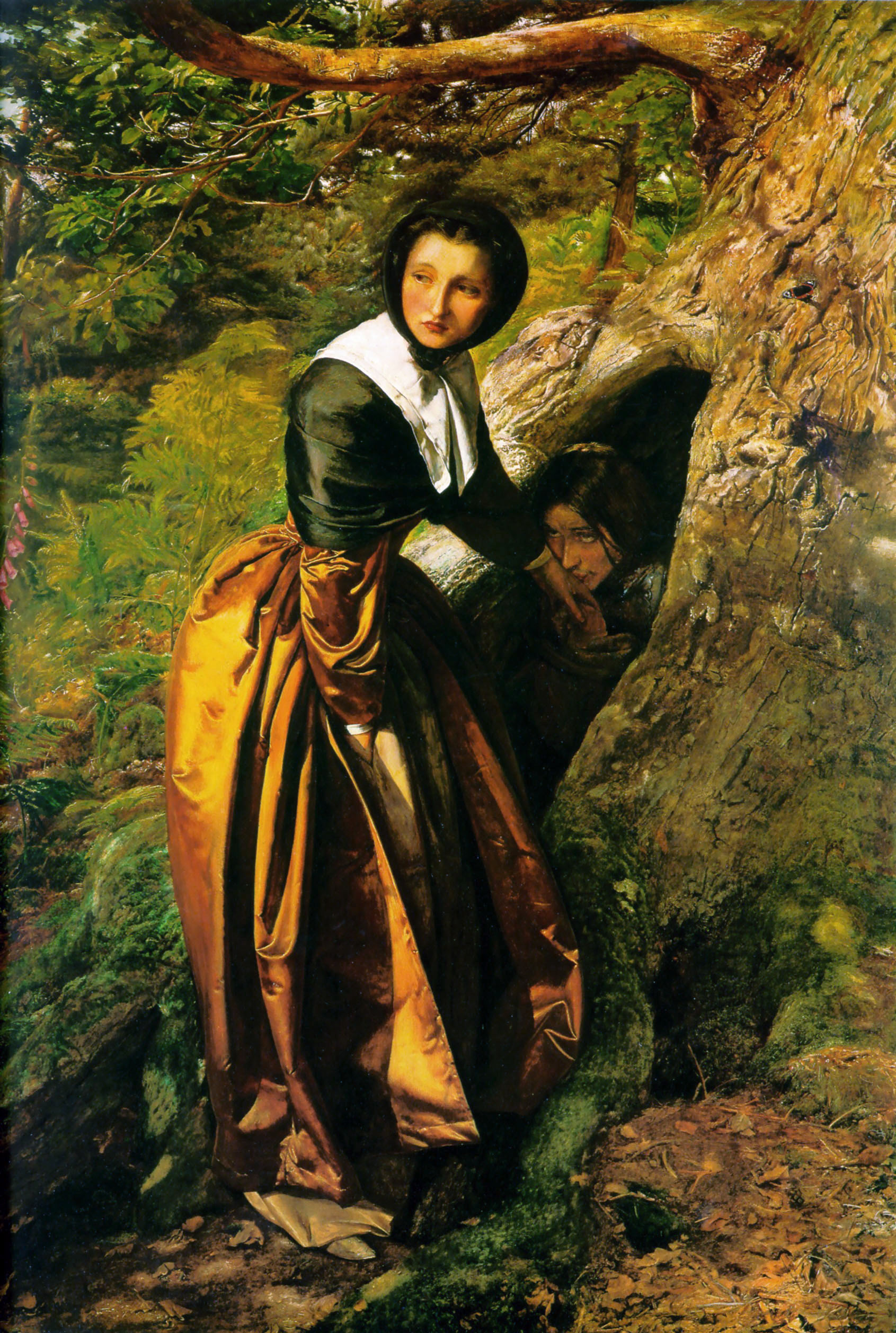
- Artist: John Everett Millais
- Year: 1852–1853
- Medium: Oil on canvas
- Dimensions: 102.8 cm × 73.6 cm (40.5 in × 29.0 in)
- Location: Andrew Lloyd Webber Collection

The Proscribed Royalist, 1651 (1852–1853) is a painting by John Everett Millais which depicts a young Puritan woman protecting a fleeing Royalist after the Battle of Worcester in 1651, the decisive defeat of Charles II by Oliver Cromwell. The Royalist is hiding in a hollow tree, a reference to a famous incident in which Charles himself hid in a tree to escape from his pursuers. Millais was also influenced by Vincenzo Bellini's 1835 opera I Puritani.

His friend and fellow painter, Arthur Hughes, served as the model for the Royalist.

Millais painted the picture in Hayes, Kent, from a local oak tree that became known as the Millais Oak.

== See also ==
- Proscription
- List of paintings by John Everett Millais
