= Richard Deane (regicide) =

English military commander and regicide

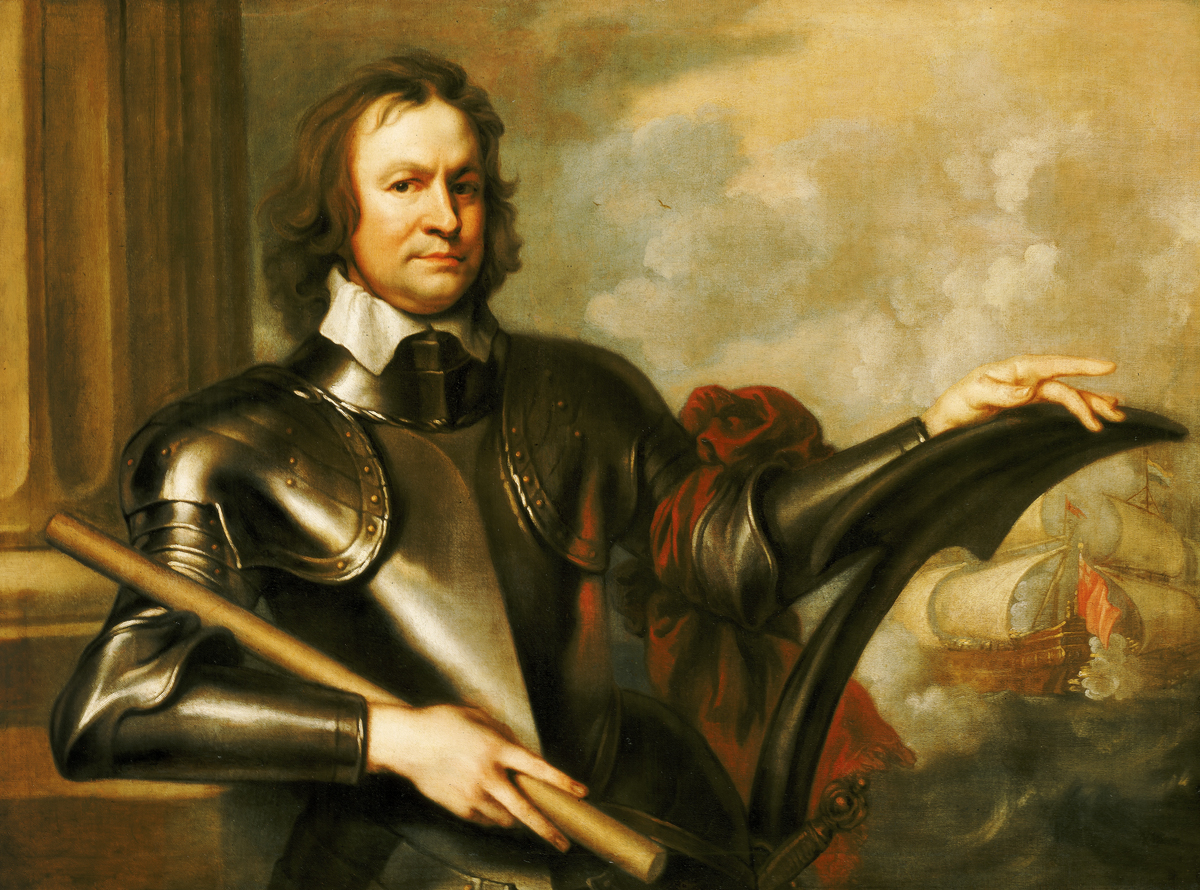
c. 1653 portrait of Deane by Robert Walker

Richard Deane (bapt. 8 July 1610– 1 June 1653) was an English military officer who supported the Parliamentarian cause in the Wars of the Three Kingdoms. He was a General at Sea, major-general and one of the regicides of Charles I.

== Biography ==
Deane was a younger son of Edward Deane of Temple Guiting or Guyting in Gloucestershire, where he was born, his baptism taking place on 8 July 1610. His family seems to have been strongly Puritan and was related to many of those Buckinghamshire families who were prominent among Oliver Cromwell's supporters during the English Civil War. His uncle or great-uncle was Sir Richard Deane, Lord Mayor of London in 1628–1629.

Few records of Deane's early life survive, but he seems to have had some sea training, possibly on a ship-of-war. At the outbreak of the Civil War he joined the parliamentary army as a volunteer in the artillery, a branch of the service with which he was constantly and honourably associated.

In 1644 he held a command in the artillery under Essex in Cornwall and took part in the surrender after the second Battle of Lostwithiel (2 September 1644). Essex (Letter to Sir Philip Stapleton, Rushworth Collection) calls him "an honest, judicious and stout man", an estimate of Deane borne out by Clarendon's "bold and excellent officer" (book xiv. cap. 27), and he was one of the few officers concerned in the surrender who were retained at the remodelling of the army.

Appointed comptroller of the ordnance, Deane commanded the artillery at Naseby (14 June 1645) and during Fairfax's campaign in the west of England in 1645. In 1647 he was promoted colonel and given a regiment. In May of that year the Parliament of England appointed Oliver Cromwell as lord-general of the forces in Ireland, and Deane, as a supporter of Cromwell who had to be reckoned with, was appointed his lieutenant of artillery. Cromwell refused to be thus put out of the way, and Deane followed his example. When the war broke out afresh in 1648 Deane went with Cromwell to Wales. As brigadier-general his leading of the right wing at Preston contributed greatly to that victory.

On the entry of the army into London in 1648, Deane superintended the seizure of treasure at the Guildhall and the Weavers' Hall the day after Thomas Pride "purged" the House of Commons and accompanied Cromwell to the consultations as to the "settlement of the Kingdom" with William Lenthall and Sir Thomas Widdrington, the keeper of the great seal. He is rightly called by Sir J. K. Laugkiton (in the Dictionary of National Biography) Cromwell's "trusted partisan", a character which he maintained in the active and responsible part taken by him in the events which led up to the trial and execution on 30 January 1649 of King Charles. He was one of the commissioners for the trial, and a member of the committee which examined the witnesses. He also signed the execution warrant, becoming the 21st of the 59 signatories to the document.

Deane's capacities and activities were now required for the navy. In 1649 the office of Lord High Admiral was put into commission. The first commissioners were Edward Popham, Robert Blake and Deane, with the title of generals-at-sea. His command at sea was interrupted in 1651, when as major-general he was brought back to the army and took part in the battle of Worcester. Later he was made president of the commission for the settlement of Scotland, following the Tender of Union, with supreme command of the military and naval forces.

At the end of 1652 Deane returned to his command as general-at-sea, where George Monck had succeeded Popham, who had died in 1651. In 1653 Deane was with Blake in command at the Battle of Portland and later took the most prominent and active part in the refitting of the fleet on the reorganisation of the naval service.

At the outset of the Battle of the Gabbard on 1 June 1653, Deane was killed. His body lay in state at Greenwich and after a public funeral was buried in Henry VII's chapel at Westminster Abbey, to be disinterred at the Restoration.

== Family ==
His daughter, Hannah, was the fourth wife of Godwin Swift (1628–1695), Attorney-General at Tipperary to the Court Palatine of the 1st Duke of Ormonde. This appointment was through his first wife, Elizabeth Wheeler, who was a niece of Sir Patrick Wemyss, the first cousin of Elizabeth Preston, Duchess of Ormonde. Godwin Swift was the uncle and guardian of Jonathan Swift and a second cousin of Erasmus Dryden, the father of England's first poet laueate John Dryden.
