= Fritz Hoenig =

German military historian (c. 1848–1902)

Fritz August Hoenig (c. 1848–1902) was a German officer and a military writer.

== Biography ==
Hoenig became an officer in the infantry in 1866. He took part in the German Austro-Prussian War (Unification War) and the Franco-Prussian War. He was wounded in the Battle of Mars-la-Tour (16 August 1870) and retired as a captain in 1876.

== Bibliography ==
Hoening works include:

- Zwei Brigade (1882)
- Oliver Cromwell (3 volumes, 1887–1889)
- 24 Stunden Moltkescher Strategie (1891)
- Gefechtsbilder aus dem Kriege 1870/71 (1891–1894)
- der Volkskrige an der Loire (6 volumes, 1893–1896)
- Die Entscheidungskämpfe des Mainefeldzuges Fränkischen an der Saale (1895)
