= Robert Walker (painter) =

English painter

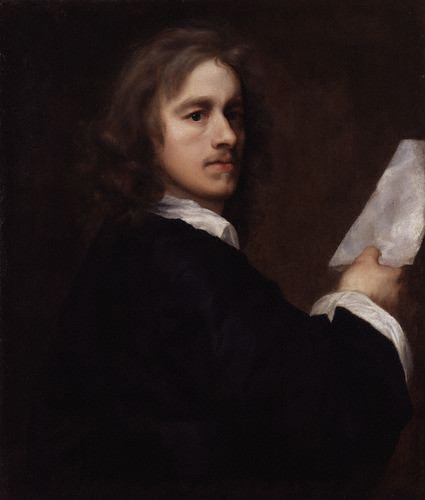
Robert Walker self-portrait, painted c. 1645-50

Robert Walker (1599–1658) was an English portrait painter, notable for his portraits of the "Lord Protector" Oliver Cromwell and other distinguished parliamentarians of the period. He was influenced by Van Dyck, and many of his paintings can now be found at the National Portrait Gallery, London.

== Life and work ==
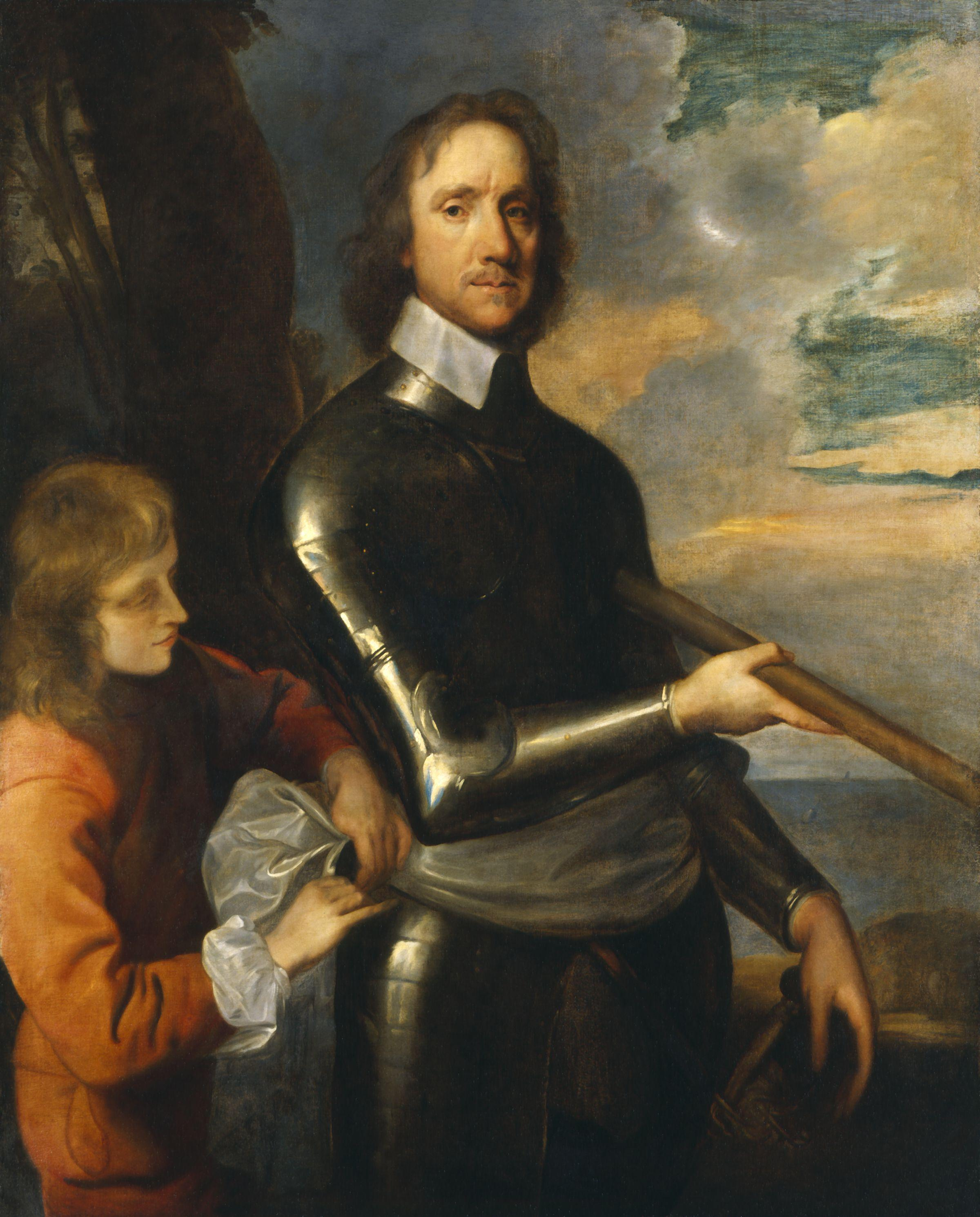
Portrait of Oliver Cromwell, 1649

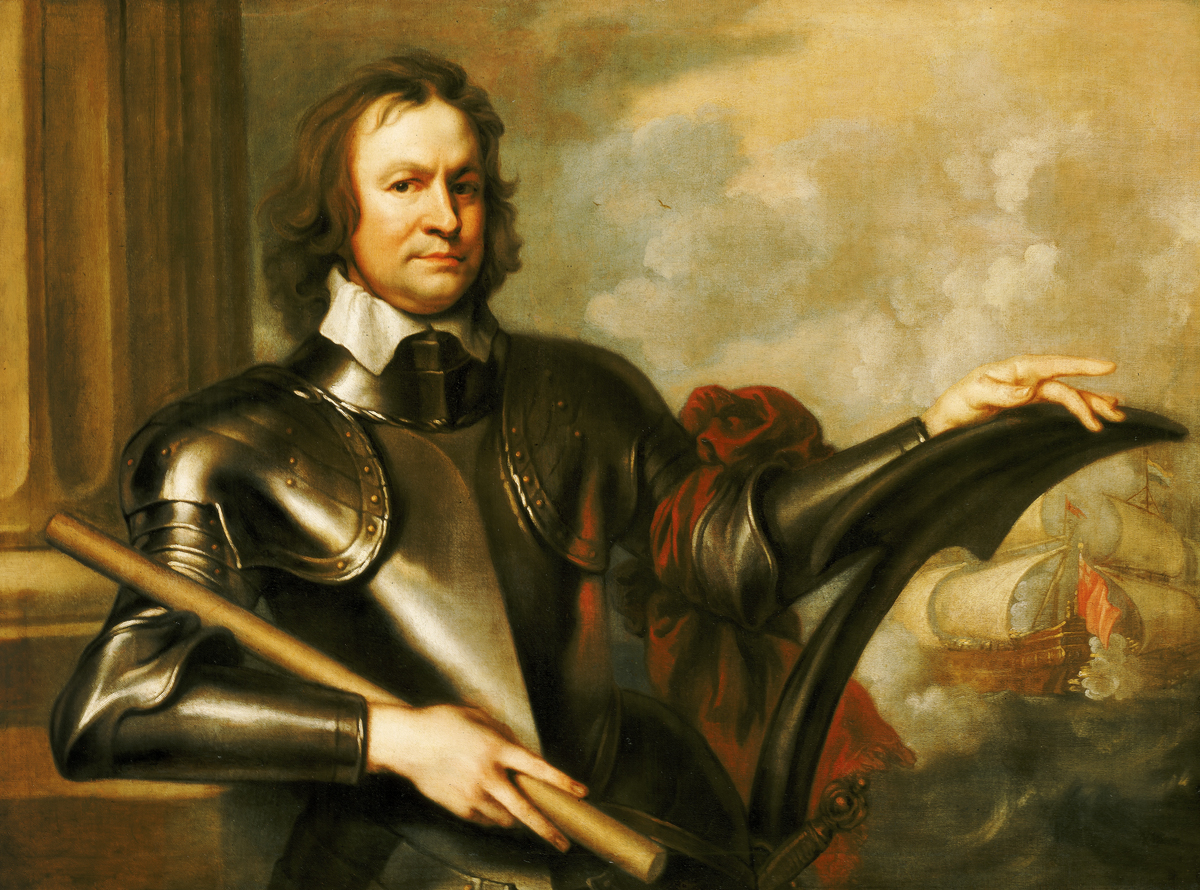
Richard Deane, 1610–1653, General at Sea by Robert Walker, painted c. 1653

Walker was the chief painter of the parliamentary party during the Commonwealth of England from 1649 to 1658. Nothing is known of his early life. His manner of painting, though strongly influenced by that of Van Dyck, is yet distinctive enough to rule out the possibility of his being one of Van Dyck's immediate pupils.

He is chiefly known for his portraits of Oliver Cromwell, and our knowledge of Cromwell's appearance is mainly based on Walker's paintings, as well as the portraits of him by Samuel Cooper and by Peter Lely. There are two main types. The earlier, representing Cromwell in armour with a page tying on his sash, and the later, full face to the waist in armour, were frequently repeated and copied.

The best example of the first type is perhaps the painting now in the National Portrait Gallery (formerly in the possession of the Rich family). This likeness was considered by diarist John Evelyn (1620–1706) to be the truest representation of Cromwell which he knew (see Numismata, p. 339). There are repetitions of this portrait elsewhere. In another portrait by Walker, Cromwell wears a gold chain and decoration sent to him by Queen Christina of Sweden.

Walker painted Henry Ireton, John Lambert (examples of these two in the National Portrait Gallery), Charles Fleetwood, Richard Keble and other prominent members of the parliamentary government. John Evelyn himself sat for him, as stated in his Diary for 1 July 1648: "I sate for my picture, in which there is a death's head, to Mr. Walker, that excellent painter"; and there is another entry on 6 July 1650: "To Mr. Walker's, a good painter, who shew'd me an excellent copie of Titian". This copy of Titian, however, does not appear, as sometimes stated, to have been painted by Walker himself. One of Walker's best paintings is the portrait of an unknown man – formerly thought to be William Faithorne the elder – now in the National Portrait Gallery.

In 1652, on the death of the Earl of Arundel, Walker was allotted apartments in Arundel House, which had been seized by the parliament. He is stated to have died in 1658.

Walker painted his own portrait three times – one is at the National Portrait Gallery, which also houses two engravings of portraits of Walker by other artists (one was finely engraved in his lifetime by Peter Lombart). Another example, with variations, is in the Ashmolean Museum at Oxford.

== Works in UK galleries and museums ==
Walker has a number of paintings in the collection of the UK's National Portrait Gallery. At least a half dozen of these were done by Robert Walker himself. The remainder were done by others after his style. The paintings noted as "by" or "by or after" with no other attribution are of Adrian Scrope, John Evelyn, Oliver Cromwell, two unknown men, and himself.

His portrait entitled Richard Deane, 1610–53, General at Sea is in the collection of the National Maritime Museum.

Two of his portraits of Cromwell are in the collection of the Cromwell Museum. The museum also has a receipt signed by Robert Walker for painting Cromwell's portrait.
