= Portrait of Oliver Cromwell =

Painting by Robert Walker

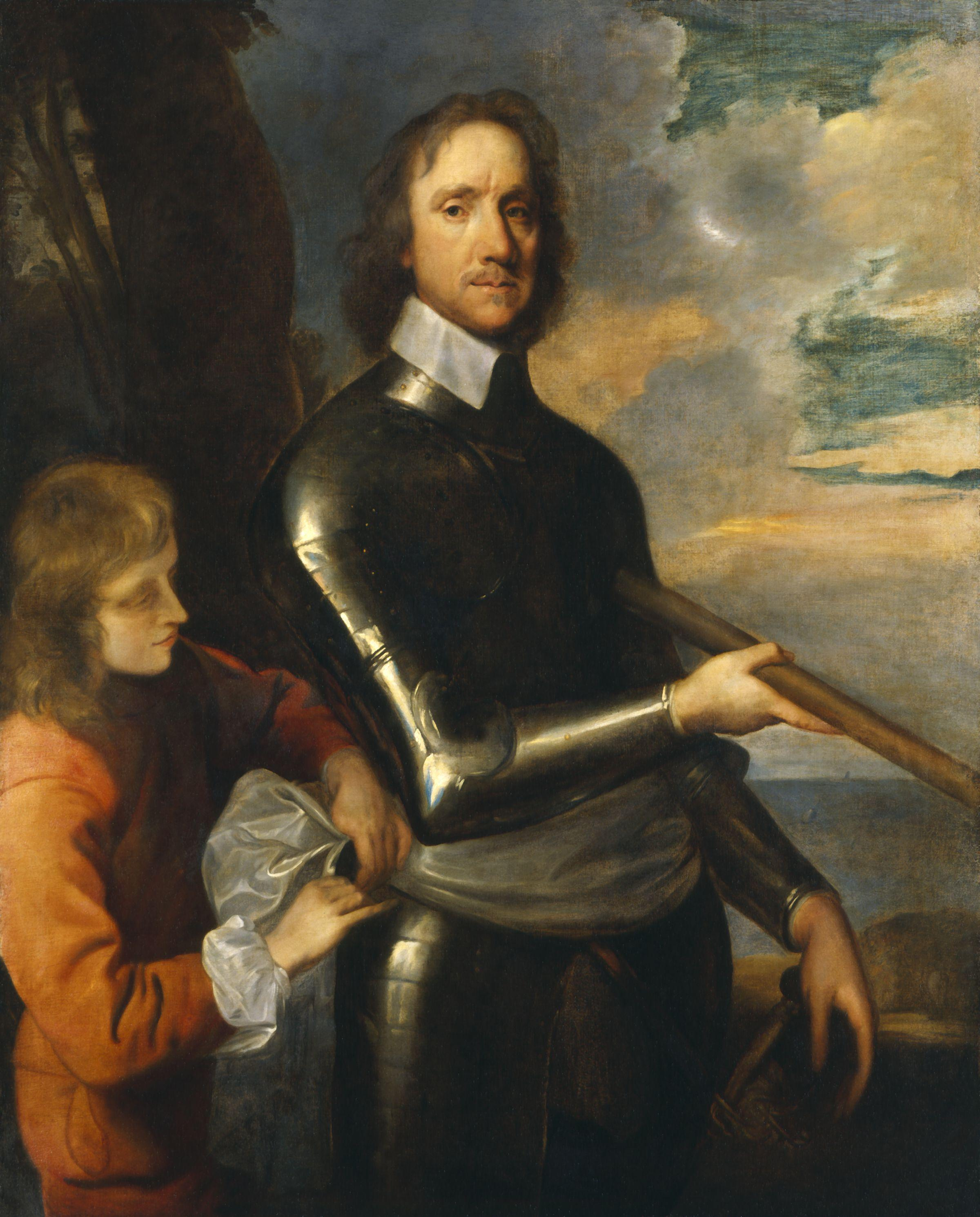
- Artist: Robert Walker
- Year: c.1649
- Type: Oil on canvas, portrait painting
- Dimensions: 12.7 cm × 101.6 cm (5.0 in × 40.0 in)
- Location: National Portrait Gallery, London

Portrait of Oliver Cromwell is a c.1649 portrait painting by the English artist Robert Walker, depicting the politician and general Oliver Cromwell. Cromwell was a Parliamentarian commander during the English Civil War and in 1653 he became head of state as Lord Protector of the Commonwealth.

This was the earliest produced portrait of Cromwell and by far the most well-known. It has drawn comparison to Anthony van Dyck's 1636 depiction of the Royalist Earl of Strafford. Cromwell is shown at three-quarters length wearing a full suit of armour, although during the Civil War only the cuirass was usually worn.

The work was likely produced the same year Cromwell sat as one of the judges at the Trial of Charles I leading to his execution on 30 January. Later he spearheaded the Cromwellian conquest of Ireland. Several versions were produced, with one version of the painting thought to have been given by Cromwell to Nathaniel Rich, a colonel of the New Model Army. Today it is in the collection of the National Portrait Gallery in London.

== Bibliography ==
- Auslander, Leora. Cultural Revolutions: Everyday Life and Politics in Britain, North America, and France. University of California Press, 2009.
- Knoppers, Laura Lunger. Constructing Cromwell: Ceremony, Portrait, and Print 1645-1661. Cambridge University Press, 2000.
