= An Excellent Medley Which You May Admire At (Without Offense) =

Song

An Excellent Medley Which You May Admire At (Without Offense) is an English broadside ballad from the 17th century, written by Martin Parker and sung to the tune of The Spanish Pavan or Tarleton's Medley. The ballad does not tell a narrative, but rather collects lines of "contrary sense" and puts them together for humorous effect. Copies of the broadside can be found in the British Library and the National Library of Scotland.

== Synopsis ==
There is no narrative to the Excellent Medley because it is a medley, composed of lines from other popular ballads. As Charles Hindley says, referring to the first stanza of the ballad: "Here we find fragments of seven or eight different ballads, and so of the other stanzas, nineteen in number, of which the medley consists: thus, supposing each stanza to be composed of lines taken from seven separate productions of this class, the whole ballad would remind the hearer, at the time it was written, of no fewer than 133 popular songs."

== Cultural and Historical Significance ==
Hindley tells us that the ballad relied on the ability of audiences to recognize the snippets from various other ballads. As he says, "the pleasure to be derived from them so much depended upon the recognition of lines from current and notorious ballads, that the moment popular recollection failed, medleys would cease to be attractive, and hence they must have been rarely reprinted." He is therefore surprised to find two different copies of An Excellent Medley. He doubts that medleys were ever popular with "lower orders" because so few of them have come down to us. He also tells us that the writers of these medleys, like Martin Parker, continually altered and added to the medleys in order to make them relevant to their own day.
