= The Last News From France =

Song

The Last News From France is an English broadside ballad from the 17th century. It tells the story of Charles II's escape to France following the Battle of Worcester, as told by the man who helped him escape by dressing as a woman. Sung to the tune of When the King Enjoys His Own Again. Copies of the broadside can be found at the University of Glasgow Library, the British Library, and Magdalene College, Cambridge. Facsimiles are also available on-line for public consumption.

== Synopsis ==
The narrator of the ballad is the man who helped Charles II (called the "King of Scots" in the ballad) escape to France following his defeat to Oliver Cromwell at the Battle of Worcester, here called the "Fight of the Northern Rats." The narrator dresses as a woman, while the king shaves his beard and dresses as the woman's serving-man. They sell one of the king's jewels to finance their journey, and then head from Worcester to London and finally to France. At each stop along the way, the narrator worries that the exiled king will be recognized (he had a bounty on his head at the time), but nobody does. They pass through Westminster Abbey, where Charles II's father, Charles I, was tried for treason, and through the Palace of Whitehall, where he was executed. They then go to Queenhive on the River Thames, where the narrator takes on the name of Mistress Anne, and take a boat to France. Once in France, the king no longer waits on the narrator, but resumes his proper place and becomes the narrator's master, which the narrator prefers. He admits that the king lost the day, but he is proud to have stood by him.

== Significance ==
The Last News From France is an extremely political ballad, explicitly positioning itself in favor of the restoration of Charles II and the Stuart monarchy, and against Oliver Cromwell and the protectorate. It is sung to the tune of When the King Enjoys His Own Again, which Joseph Ritson calls "the most famous and popular air ever heard in this country." The cavalier song was written during the English Civil War by Martin Parker in support of Charles I and Charles II. It was later adopted by the Jacobites to support King James II.
