= The Success of the Two English Travellers Newly Arrived at London =

Song

Song
- Published: 1685
- Genre: Broadside ballad

The Success of the Two English Travellers, Newly Arrived in London is an English broadside ballad from the late 17th century about two sailors who suffer abuse over 20 years of travel and return home to England to serve James II of England. Sung to an Excellent New Irish Tune. Copies of the broadside can be found at the National Library of Scotland, the British Library, and Magdalene College, Cambridge.

== Synopsis ==
The ballad is about two English sailors who want to travel the world for fun, but everywhere they go they are abused by the locals, who call them English rebels and accuse them of murdering their king, Charles I. First they go to France, where locals throw stones at them in the streets. Next, they sail to Spain but locals on the beach pull their rapiers, so the travelers move on. From there, they go to Venice, where they are abused some more.

The duo travel for twenty years before returning to London where the Court is in mourning because Charles II is dead. After The Duke of Monmouth and The Earl of Argyll fail to depose King James in the Monmouth Rebellion, the two travelers vow to stay in England and serve the king and the Queen Mary, and to drive the French and Dutch away.
