= A Pleasant New Song Betwixt a Sailor and his Love =

English broadside ballad

Song
- Genre: Broadside ballad

A Pleasant New Song Betwixt a Sailor and His Love is an English broadside ballad from the 17th century. It tells the story of a sailor who is reunited with his lover in England after a long time at sea. They vow that they were constant and true to each other while he was away, and promise to stay together in England from that moment forward. It is sung to the tune of Dulcina. Copies of the ballad can be found in the University of Glasgow Library and Magdalene College, Cambridge.

== Synopsis ==
The first eight stanzas are told from the perspective of the sailor, who has just returned home after a long sea voyage. At first, the sailor is worried that his love is angry at him for being away for so long, and that she has vowed not to speak to him when he returns. If that's the case, he promises to leave, but asks her first to kiss him and welcome him home. He goes on to promise that his heart remained fixed on her throughout his journey, that he was always true to her, and that no other woman could turn his head. When he asks her to sit with him, she first makes her reply.

The final four stanzas are from the woman's point of view. She tells him that she was sad when he was gone, but now rejoices that he has returned. She tells him that she has also been true to him. Even though she had many suitors while he was away, she refused all of them. She then makes him promise that he will not leave again, and agrees to sit with him. The final stanza offers the "pleasant" reunion promised in the title.

== Cultural and historical relevance ==
Patricia Fumerton uses the woodcut illustrations from the broadside in her article "Mocking Aristocratic Place: The Perspective of the Streets". Woodcuts were often reused in different broadside ballads, and Fumerton traces one of the woodcuts from "Sailor and his Love" to the "Map of Mock-Beggar Hall" and "The Man-Woman," linking "The Sailor and his Love" to issues of gender transgression. Fumerton argues that contemporary readers would have noted the reuse of the woodcut and thus made mental associations to other gender-transgressing ballads.
