= The Low Country Soldier =

Song

The Low Country Soldier is an English broadside ballad dating back to the late 17th- or early 18th-centuries about a soldier who returns to England as a poor beggar. After pleading with various people to give him money, he decides to forgo the life of a beggar and becomes a highwayman. Copies of the broadside can be found at the British Library, the National Library of Scotland, the University of Glasgow Library and Magdalene College, Cambridge.

== Synopsis ==
The ballad is told from the perspective of a soldier who fought in many bloody battles only to return home to England as a beggar. He asks a man to look kindly upon him and give him two shillings. He says he's not like other drunks and beggars, and tells his story. He has been to the Greek Olympics and has fought in many brave battles. In one battle, he was hiding behind a barricade when a "hand-granado" took his ear off but allowed him to survive. He was blown up again in the Siege of Buda, but he got up off the field of the slain and fought back. He has stepped on mines a dozen times, and has been shot in the head twice. He lost an eye during a push of pike and lost his thigh at the Birgam Siege. At Ostend he fought as if he were mad, and tells us that if Sir Francis Vere were still alive, he would vouch for the narrator's bravery. He complains that even though he fought and defeated the Dutch, the Spanish, and the French, he is now forced to dress in rags and beg for a living.

In the epilogue, the narrator decides that he is too good for a life of begging. Instead, he becomes a highwayman and risks the gallows for a life of adventure.

== Reuse of the tune ==
Angela McShane cites The Low Country Soldier in her discussion of amateur balladeer and shoemaker-turned-cobbler Richard Rigby. Rigby used the tune of The Low Country Soldier for his own ballad The Shoemaker's Delight, which celebrates the "military traditions of the shoemaker". According to McShane, this was a self-conscious attempt to align the two similar story lines.
