= Ralph and Nell's Ramble to Oxford =

Enblish broadside ballad

Song
- Published: 1760
- Genre: Broadside ballad

Ralph and Nell's Ramble to Oxford is an English broadside ballad from the late 18th century. It is told from the perspective of Ralph, who narrates a trip to Oxford taken by himself and his sister, Nell. He tells of all their adventures that day, and all the things they saw. Also known as The Oxford Ramble and Country Dick's Ramble to Oxford, it is sung to the tune of The Dragon of Wantley. Copies of the broadside can be found in British Library and the National Library of Scotland. Facsimiles of the text are also available on-line.

== Synopsis ==
Ralph has heard a lot about Oxford, and wants to visit. His father agrees to let him go with his sister, Nell, and his mother makes him take a horse so they can ride to Oxford. On their way, they stop and ask everybody how far it is, and the people make fun of him, calling him a "Country Dick."

They go to the Two Dogs Alehouse to get a room, but Nell decides that this is the first step toward becoming beggars. They decide to move on toward town, where they see a man dressed in rags wearing a plate on his head. Ralph thinks he has found a knife on the ground, but when he goes to pick it up, it turns out that the townspeople were playing an April Fools joke and had covered the underside of the knife with feces. Ralph is ashamed, but he doesn't say anything, and they walk on.

In an alley, a wencher grabs Nell and tries to kiss her, but Ralph hits him over the head with his stick. They go to church, but Ralph doesn't like it because his prayers are interrupted by bagpipes and drunken noise. They then go to a garden where they see a sundial for the first time, and then a room filled with books and with big globes in the middle. There they hear about new scientific theories, which Ralph calls the "Black-Art."

When the sun starts to go down, they decide to go home. Before they leave, they run into two men with weapons who look like they are going to murder them. They get their horse and ride home, full of new stories to tell their parents and little sister.

=== Form and language ===
Written in eighteen stanzas of common metre double, with an ABABCDCD rhyme scheme. Told from the standpoint of the "country dick," the language shows an accent in the substitution of v for f ("vather" for "father") and z for s ("zister" for "sister").
