= The Clarret Drinkers Song: Or, The Good Fellows Design =

Song

The Clarret Drinker's Song: Or, The Good Fellows Design is an English broadside ballad published by John Oldham in 1680 and is set to the standard tune of "Let Caesar Live Long." An original copy of the ballad is located in the National Library of Scotland, however online facsimiles and recordings are available for public consumption.

== Synopsis ==
Set to the tune of "Let Caesar Live Long," this ballad explores European early modern royalist ideology by offsetting political discord with a love for alcohol. The speaker of this ballad is a claret drinker, an individual who possesses a strong love for wine. The speaker claims that, given the constantly shifting political framework of 1680, that the drunkard is the only profession that never changes: "I'll drink in Defiance of Gibbet and Halter, / This is the Profession that never will alter." The ballad is satirical in nature, bringing up many important diplomatic and legislative issues of 1680 Europe only to undercut them with the speaker's political apathy and love for liquor.
