= An Admirable New Northern Story =

Song

An Admirable New Northern Story is an English broadside ballad from the late 17th century. It tells the story of Constance and Anthony, two lovers who are constant to each other despite two years of separation. When Anthony has to leave England, Constance dresses like a man and joins his ship's kitchen crew in order to stay with him. After a shipwreck, they are separated for two years in Spain. When they finally see each other again by chance, they are reunited and return to England to be married. Also known as "Constance and Anthony." Sung to the Tune of "I Would Thou Wert in Shrewsbury." Copies of the broadside can be found in the British Library, the University of Glasgow Library, the National Library of Scotland, and Magdalene College, Cambridge. On-line facsimiles of the ballad are also available for public consumption.

== Synopsis ==
At the beginning of the ballad, Anthony tells Constance that his "calling" requires that he goes to sea, and asks her not to grieve while he is gone. Constance refuses to let him go alone, and tells him that if he goes to sea, she will dress like a boy and work for the cook in the kitchen doing menial work. When she assures him that she will be able to handle life at sea, Anthony agrees to the plan. She joins the ship as a scullion, serving food to the ship's crew and stealing kisses from Anthony whenever possible.

The ship is wrecked in a storm off the coast of Spain, and Constance saves herself by swimming ashore on a plank, ending up in Bilbao. At first she is thankful, but then she wonders why she saved herself when Anthony did not survive the wreck. She has no idea that he also made it ashore safely. A rich Spanish merchant finds Constance on the shore and takes her in as a servant, thinking she is a boy who is grieving over the loss of her brother.

Meanwhile, Anthony is taken in as a galley slave by an English pirate. For two years he rows the pirate's ship while Constance serves the Spanish merchant. Fate intervenes when the merchant captures the pirate's ship and brings ashore all that the ship contains, including its slaves. Constance sees Anthony and immediately confesses the whole truth to the merchant, who is amused by the story. He sends Constance and Anthony back to England in a Spanish ship with a sum of gold upon which they can live. They are married in Appleby in Westmorland and live happily ever after in "mirth and glee."

=== Form ===
The form is 16 stanzas of 12 lines each. The first eight lines are a variation of common meter double, consisting of iambic trimeter lines rhyming ABAB. The final four lines are a chorus composed of two formal couplets.

== Historical and cultural significance ==
An Admirable New Northern Story was one of a number of ballads celebrating the "female warrior" when ballad publishing restrictions were loosened following the 1660 restoration of Charles II to the English throne. Diane Dugaw reads the ballad in relation to other "warrior women" ballads, such as Mary Ambree, The Merchants Daughter of Bristol, The Valiant Commander, The Gallant She-Soldier, and The Famous Woman Drummer. According to Dugaw, each of these ballads combines love and glory, and highlights the woman's masquerade as a man as a key component in overcoming the threat of separation. Dugaw suggests that "I Would Thou Wert in Shrewsbury" is probably the same tune as the "New Northern Tune" of The Valiant Commander, arguing that this recycling of tunes also contributed to linking these ballads of women warriors together for contemporary audiences.
