= On the Death of His Grace, the Duke of Albemarle =

Song

On the Death of His Grace, the Duke of Albemarle is an English broadside ballad published in 1670, and is currently housed in the National Library of Scotland as well as the British Library. Online facsimiles of the ballad are also available for public consumption. Though current research has failed to unearth the author of this ballad, the historical significance of the piece is nevertheless notable. The ballad's subject is George Monck, 1st Duke of Albemarle, who died of edema on 3 January 1670. After the death of Cromwell in 1658, Monck was instrumental in the Restoration of Charles II to the English throne.

== Synopsis ==
The ballad's technical form is simplistic in nature. It's broken up in five stanzas of rhyming couplets, and contains 100 lines. This ballad both celebrates Monck's life and military accomplishments and bemoans the loss England has suffered from his death. Though the ballad necessarily takes on elegiac undertones, its primary purpose is to commend and immortalize Monck: "And though Y’ are Dead, to future Ages fame / With such Advantage shall transmit Your Name, as no Oblivious shall thy Deeds obscure, / As long as Time, or History, indure." Indeed, the general consensus among both historians and the author of this ballad is that Monck was essential to the eventual unification of England, Scotland, and Ireland under the banner of Charles II: "Yet who like You, when Fate seem’d most to frown, / Sav’d an Usurp’d, Secur’d on Envied Crown, / And Three Great Kingdoms did from Ruine free, / Deserves those Honors which are pay’d to Thee."
