= A Voyage to Virginia =

Song

A Voyage to Virginia is an English broadside ballad. Although surviving copies of the broadside date back to the late 17th century, the ballad could have been available in the early to mid-17th century. The ballad is told from the point of view of a soldier, who is saying farewell to his love, Betty. Copies of the broadside can be found at the British Library, the National Library of Scotland, and Magdelene college.

== Synopsis ==
The ballad is told from the perspective of a soldier who is about to leave England for Virginia, despite his lover's entreaties. He urges his lover (Betty) to stay constant and true to him while he is away. He reminds Betty that he has always been true to her and has given her everything she has ever wanted, and now she must let him serve England in the New World. She tells him that she will dress in men's clothing and sail alongside of him under the same commander, but he replies that it is too dangerous and, giving her a ring, promises to come back to her. In the final stanza, the soldier leaves for Virginia and Betty goes home to mourn his departure and to send him happy wishes. It is sung to the tune of "I Live Not Where I Love."

=== Form ===
The ballad is written in a variation of ballad meter, alternating between iambic pentameter and iambic tetrameter. Each eight-line stanza combines four lines in the rhyme scheme of traditional common meter (ABAB) followed by four lines in ballad meter (ABCB).

== Historical and Cultural Significance ==
Bernard Bailyn reads A Voyage to Virginia within the larger context of a 17th-century British fascination and anxiety concerning the peopling of the New World with a labor force. This anxiety focused on the dreaded conditions of the transatlantic voyage facing merchants and soldiers, which are anticipated with stoicism by the soldier in the ballad, but also on the transportation of criminals, slaves, and honest laborers who had fallen on hard times. In order to see the ballad within this context of emerging global markets and transportation, Bailyn suggests reading "A Voyage to Virginia" alongside "The Poor Unhappy Transported Felon's Sorrowful Account of his Fourteen Years Transportation to Virginia" and "The Trappan'd Maiden". Catherine Armstrong, on the other hand, argues that "Voyage to Virginia was not a serious commentary on the colonial enterprise, but rather a comic love story about a soldier who had to serve in the New World, and his lover who was reluctant to see him go.
