= 'Tis Money makes a Man: Or, The Good-Fellows Folly =

17th-century English ballad

'Tis Money makes a Man: Or, The Good-Fellows Folly is an English broadside ballad believed to have been published between 1674 and 1679 by John Wade, and is located in the National Library of Scotland. It is best known for its first lines, "OO what a madness 'tis to borrow or lend, / Or for strong Liquor thy Money to spend" as well as its popular refrain, "Then make much of a Penny as near as you can, / For if that be wanting thou'rt counted no man."

== Synopsis ==
Set often to the tune of "Digby's Farewell," this ballad details the plights of a good-fellow who spends most of his money in an ale-house, and in doing so neglects his wife and children. Historically, we can link him to the Shakespearean character Sir John Falstaff, since both can be described as companions fond of feasting, drinking, and general conviviality. The ballad's central theme is money, and it is used as a vehicle to explore the vices of drinking, commenting on the idea that a man who spends all his hard-earned coin on liquor is no true man at all. The ballad also explores issues of infidelity, since it is implied later in the ballad that the speaker forsakes the company of his wife for the company of the ale-house hostess. The tone of the ballad is moral and advisory in nature, since the speaker warns the listener about the dangers of alcohol, pleading that the listener heed his advice lest he end up like him.
