= A free admonition without any fees / To warne the Papistes to beware of three trees =

1571 English broadside ballad by William Birch

- Genre: Broadside ballad
- Text: William Birch
- Published: 1571: England
- Publisher: Broadside

"A free admonition without any fees / To warne the Papistes to beware of three trees" is an English broadside ballad published by William Birch in 1571 and is not currently set to any tune. An original copy of the ballad is located in the Huntington Library, however, online facsimiles are available for public consumption.

== Synopsis ==
The first lines of this ballad, "If that you be / not past all / grace, / O Papystes / heare mee / speake, / Let reason / rule, and / truth take / place, / Cease you from that you seeke," firmly cement its religious theme. The speaker asks those who associate themselves with papist group to cease seeking God through a Catholic vein, and conform to the religious ideology of the Protestant Reformation. While the term "papist" became an anti-Catholic slur in the mid-19th century, in the sixteenth-century it simply identified those who pledged their religious allegiance to the Pope. Nevertheless, the ballad pleads with the papists to forsake the Catholic religion and be "grafted in this stock" of emerging Protestantism.
