= Neptune's Raging Fury =

Song

Neptune's Raging Fury is an English Broadside Ballad. The ballad is told from the perspective of a sailor, who is explaining the perils of sea voyages to those who stay on land. Copies of the broadside can be found at the National Library of Scotland, the British Library, the University of Glasgow Library, and Magdelene College. Online facsimiles of the text are also available.

== Synopsis ==
In this ballad, a sailor addresses those who stay on land and know nothing about the perils of the ocean. The sailor describes the horrors of a big storm and the valiant courage required to face the dangers of the ocean. In addition to facing storms, the sailor boasts that he and his fellow seamen will gallantly face any naval force and shrink from no enemy. The people of England benefit from the courage and constancy of the sailor, he explains, through the spices, wines, and other goods he brings back from distant lands as well as the security afforded by a naval presence. The sailor calls on the people who stay on land to think about this, and then closes the ballad with a celebration of the rejoicing he will do in the taverns once back on land.

== Cultural and Historical Significance ==
Neptune's Fury is one of the most popular sea songs on the 17th and 18th centuries. It is one of many ballads that celebrate seamen not just for defending the nation, but for supplying it with valuable goods and commodities. Gunda Windmüller argues that the ballad should be read in the context of early empire and the global economy. Gerald Hammond notes that the sailor's words indicate a class antagonism that resents the rich merchants who merely stay home and enjoy the exploits of those who risk their lives in sea-faring economic trade. Sung to the tune of "When the Stormy Winds Do Blow."

=== In popular culture ===
Broadsides of the ballad were republished throughout the 17th, 18th, and 19th centuries, and the ballad was published in popular song books and anthologies. It was often reworked and/or plagiarized, as in the ballad, Stormy Winds Do Blow.

The ballad was recorded by early music ensemble The City Waites on their album, Penny Merriments: Street Songs of 17th Century England (2005).

Neptune's Raging Fury is one of three melodies included in the theme of the Republic of Pirates civilization in Sid Meier's Civilization VII
