= News From Hide-Park =

Song

News From Hide-Parke is an English broadside ballad from the 17th century. The ballad describes a man who desires a romantic encounter with a woman from Hyde Park, however upon arriving at her house, it is revealed that she is old, bald, ugly, and missing an eye and nose. Copies of the broadside can be found at the National Library of Scotland, the University of Glasgow Library, the British Library, and Magdalene College, Cambridge. Facsimile transcriptions are also available on-line for public transcription.

== Synopsis ==
The narrator begins the story by describing a man on his way to Hyde Park on a May evening. The man goes there to enjoy the variety of flowers and women. He calls Hyde Park a "market of maidens," and likens the women to a garden of flowers due to their colourful clothing. He selects a woman he finds attractive and courts her. They talk until it grows dark. The park empties out and the man accompanies the woman to her home in her carriage. After many denials, she finally agrees to let him come up to her room. While she is changing, he watches her through a peephole in the closet. The woman takes off her wig, revealing that she is bald. The narrator says her head looks like an ostrich's egg. The man keeps watching as she removes a false eye, dentures, and finally a false nose. When the woman washes off her makeup, the man says she looks like a Lancashire witch of 90 years old. The man stumbles down the stairs and back out into the street while screaming "witch" and "whore". At the end of the ballad, he vows not to go back to Hyde Park to look for women, and warns other men to learn from his mistake.

== Cultural and historical significance ==
John Ashton uses the ballad as a good "graphic description" of Hyde Park at the time.

N. W. Bawcutt speculates that Jonathan Swift drew on News From Hide-Parke when writing A beautiful young nymph going to bed. Bawcutt cites the movement from an "impressively glamorous atmosphere" that is then destroyed in the end as evidence that Swift was drawing on the old ballad.

The ballad is mentioned briefly in Hyde Park, Its History and Romance, as evidence that Hyde Park was a "place of intrigue" for 17th-century balladeers and playwrights.
