= Coridon and Parthenia =

Broadside ballad

Coridon and Parthenia or "Coridon and Parthenia, The Languishing Shepherd made Happy. Or, Faithful Love rewarded" is a broadside ballad, which dates from, by estimation of the English Short Title Catalogue, the last three decades of the seventeenth century. The ballad begins, "When busie Fame ore all the Plain,/ Parthenias Praises rung." Copies of the ballad can be found at the National Library of Scotland, the British Library, and the University of Glasgow Library. Alternatively, online facsimiles of the ballad are available for public consumption.

== Tune ==
Extant copies of "Coridon and Parthenia," found at the English Broadside Ballad Archive of University of California, Santa Barbara, are set to the tune of "When Busy Fame/ When Busie Fame"—which first appeared in 1679. Simpson suggests that the tune name did not sediment into a single title until later; as a result, the tune's name and orthography vary. Some variations include: "When Busy Fame," "When Busie Fame," "Busy Fame," and "Busie Fame." By the time of the ballad opera though, the tune was no longer popular, suggesting that this ballad had a relatively short shelf life in comparison to more popular ballads like The Ballad of Chevy Chase and Barbara Allen (song).

Sheet music for the tune can be found in both Chappell and Simpson.

== Synopsis ==
The ballad begins with praise for the beautiful Parthenia whose beauty pales to no one—human or mythic creature. Opposite Parthenia is Coridon who has, until this point, proved resilient to Cupid's bow, and has not been lured into love. Upon seeing Parthenia, Coridon feels that he is undone, and his longing for Parthenia is so great that he can neither move nor walk, and feels resigned to die of his burning adoration.

The ballad concludes with a dialogue interaction between Parenthia and Coridon. Parthenia spots lovestruck Coridon who professes that he will die if she does not love him. Parthenia applauds Coridon's constancy, and the ballad concludes with Parthenia running off with Coridon.

== Notes ==
The popularity of the tune When Busy Fame, as suggested by Chappell, coincided with the reign of Charles II, though there seem to be no hypotheses as to why this is.

Most of the ballads set to the tune of When Busy Fame—or any variation therein—have been collected in the Roxburghe Collection, available at the British Library.
