= The Old Man's Complaint Against His Wretched Son, Who to Advance His Marriage Did Undo Himself =

Song

"A Ballad Intituled, The Old Mans Complaint against his / Wretched Son, who to Advance his Marriage, did undo himself" is a broadside ballad about an aged father's plaintive account of the suffering he endured under his son and daughter-in-law. The publication date for this ballad is not definitive. The English Broadside Ballad Archive (EBBA) at the Department of English at the University of California, Santa Barbara lists the dates from 1686 to 1693, while the English Short Title Catalogue (ESTC) records the date at 1695. An extant copy of this ballad can be found in the British Library's Collection of Roxburghe Ballads. This ballad is recognized by its opening lines, "ALL you that fathers be, / look on my misery".

== Synopsis ==
The ballad begins with the titular old man lamenting the way his children have mistreated him. He recounts, for example, how his children throw insults at him daily, regard him as a servant, and openly wish for him to die. The ballad also relates that though the father's son and daughter-in-law were married for seven years and lived in wealth, God cursed them with infertility, preventing them from the possibility of conceiving a child. It was a problem that drove the wife to grief and, as a result, she sought sexual dalliances with other men, yet her pursuits could not alleviate her pain. Unable to bear her misery, she strangles herself and dies. The husband, meanwhile, as a result of his grief over her death dies as well. His ungrateful children finally dead, the father is able to enjoy the remainder of his life.
