= Cromwell's Panegyrick =

Cromwell's Panegyrick is a printed English broadside ballad composed in 1647. Copies of it are in collections including the British Library, Society of Antiquaries, The National Archives, Huntington Library, and the National Library of Scotland. Online facsimiles of the ballad are available online for public consumption. Though the ballad's title claims to be a panegyric (a poem praising Cromwell for his military and political accomplishments), it quickly becomes a mock-panegyric, taking the theme of praise and turning it on its head. In this way, the ballad becomes more of a satire as opposed to a true panegyric. For instance, though it describes in part Cromwell's role in the Second English Civil War, which broke out officially in 1648, it also mentions how large and bulbous Cromwell's nose was: "Well may his Nose, that is dominicall, / Take pepper int." The ballad undercuts all of Cromwell's accomplishments in the military, and goes so far as to claim – as many did of Cromwell in the 1640s and 50s – that he was an individual motivated purely by a desire for power and kingship.

== Synopsis ==
As stated above, this ballad is a mock-panegyric and takes themes of praise and turns them into insults. While the ballad's first line teases a glorification of Cromwell, "Shall Presbyterian bells ring Cromwels praise", we can see that the ballad ends with Cromwell not only dead, but buried with no headstone, which in early modern England indicated that the person in question either lacked the funds to afford a headstone or was of such ill-repute that he was deemed unworthy of such a posthumous marker: "And on his Grave since there must be no Stone, / Shall stand this Epitaph; That he has none."

== Form ==
The ballad consists of two long stanzas of rhyming couplets, and is in primarily iambic pentameter.
