= The Honour of a London Prentice =

Song

The Honour of a London Prentice is an English broadside ballad from the late 17th century. The ballad is a nationalistic celebration of England. It follows an English apprentice who goes to Turkey and wins the respect of the King and the hand of the Turkish Princess through heroic deeds. He defends Queen Elizabeth, and eventually gets the Turkish King to agree that no country is better than England, and no government is better than that of Queen Elizabeth. Sung to the tune of All You That Love Goodfellows. Copies of the broadside can be found in the British Library, the National Library of Scotland, and Magdalene College, Cambridge. Facsimile transcriptions are also available on-line for public consumption.

== Synopsis ==
The narrator sings of a worthy apprentice, his adventures, and all he's done for the country of England. The man was born in Cheshire and then moved to London to become an apprentice. A merchant sends him to Turkey, where he begins jousting against knights who don't believe that Elizabeth is the greatest woman in the world. Twenty knights disagree with him, and he takes them all down. The king becomes angry and sends his son out to kill the apprentice. The prince calls him a traitor and a boy. The apprentice responds that he is neither, and that an English apprentice is just as good as any Turkish knight, and proceeds to kill the prince with one blow to the neck. The king decides that the apprentice will die the most horrible death imaginable, and puts him in jail while he starves two lions in order to make them vicious. When the time comes, the lions are so hungry that they have become weak. When they attack the apprentice, he reaches deep into lions' throats, rips out their hearts, and throws them at the king in front of everybody. When the King sees this, all of his hate turns to love and he thinks he has found an angel. The apprentice assures him that he isn't an angel, but he did have help from heaven. The Turkish King has an epiphany and claims that England is the greatest country in the world, and Queen Elizabeth is the greatest ruler. He pardons the apprentice and gives him his daughter's hand in marriage. The apprentice and the princess live happily ever after.

== Legacy ==
William Chappell says that "next to the national anthems, there is not any tune more of a more spirit-stirring character, nor is there any one more characteristic of English national music" than this tune. He compares it to Prince Rupert's March and Old King Cole.

J.A. Leo Lemay argues that Benjamin Franklin's Autobiography and the Horatio Alger stories of the 19th century are later versions of success story ballads like The Honour of a London Prentice. Lemay likens the rise of Franklin to the rise of the apprentice as hero through sudden strokes of good fortune and knightly feats of courage.
