= Popery =

Archaic derogatory term for Roman Catholicism

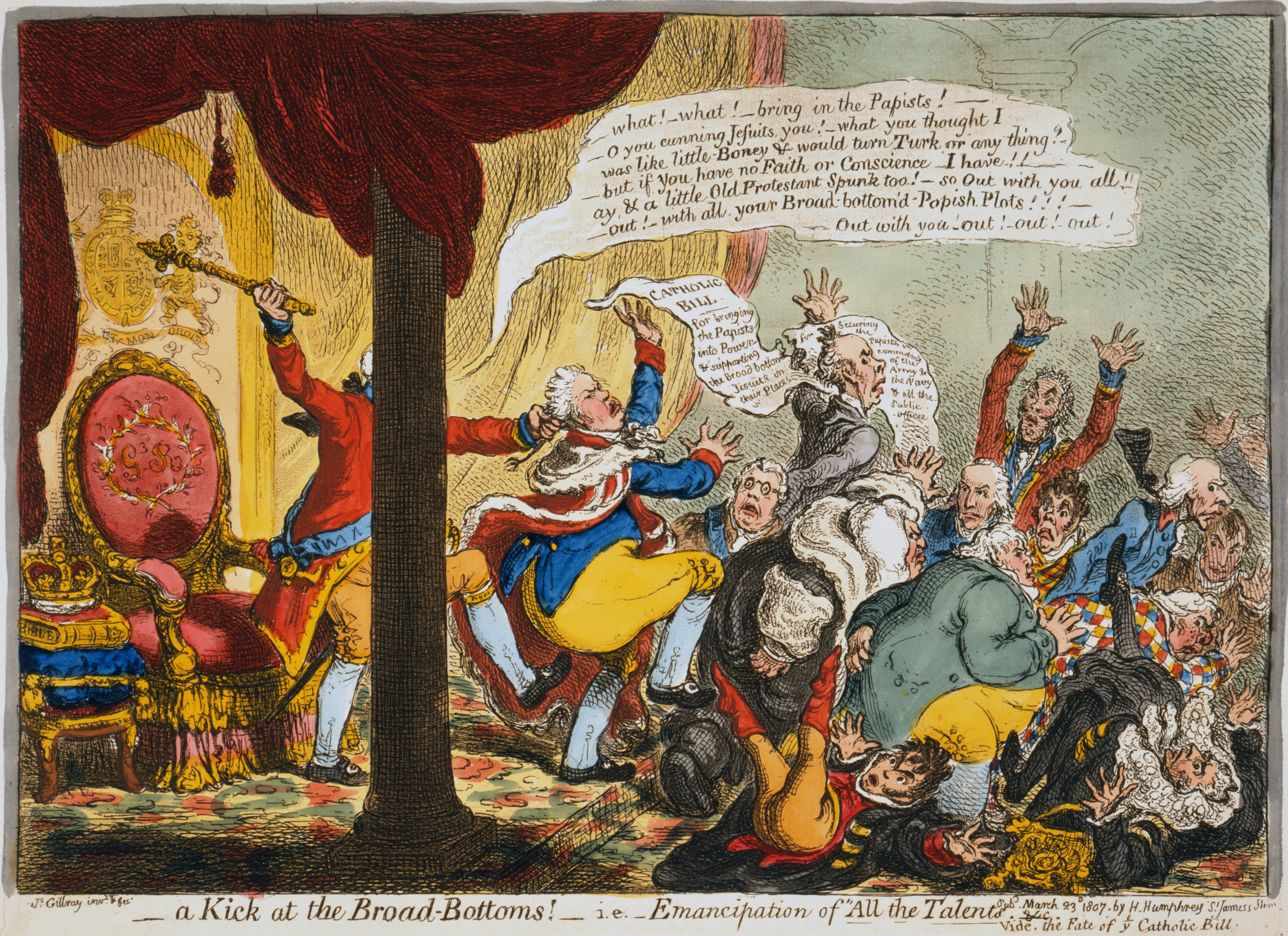
1807 cartoon by James Gillray depicting George III saying "bring in the papists!"

The words Popery (adjective Popish) and Papism (adjective Papist, also used to refer to an individual) are mainly historical pejorative words in the English language for Roman Catholicism, once frequently used by Protestants and Eastern Orthodox Christians to label their Catholic opponents, who differed from them in accepting the authority of the Pope over the Christian Church. The words were popularised during the English Reformation (1532–1559), when the Church of England broke away from the Catholic Church and divisions emerged between those who rejected papal authority and those who continued to follow Rome. The words are recognised as pejorative; they have been in widespread use in Protestant writings until the mid-nineteenth century, including use in some laws that remain in force in the United Kingdom.

Popery and Papism are sometimes used in modern writing as dog whistles for anti-Catholicism, or as pejorative ways of distinguishing Catholicism from other forms of Christianity that refer to themselves as catholic, such as Eastern Orthodoxy, Lutherans of Evangelical Catholic churchmanship or Anglicans of Anglo-Catholic churchmanship. Papist was used in the latter way in 2008 by the Aristotelian University of Thessaloniki at a conference opposing ecumenism, and the word sees some wider use in the Eastern Orthodox Church.

== History ==
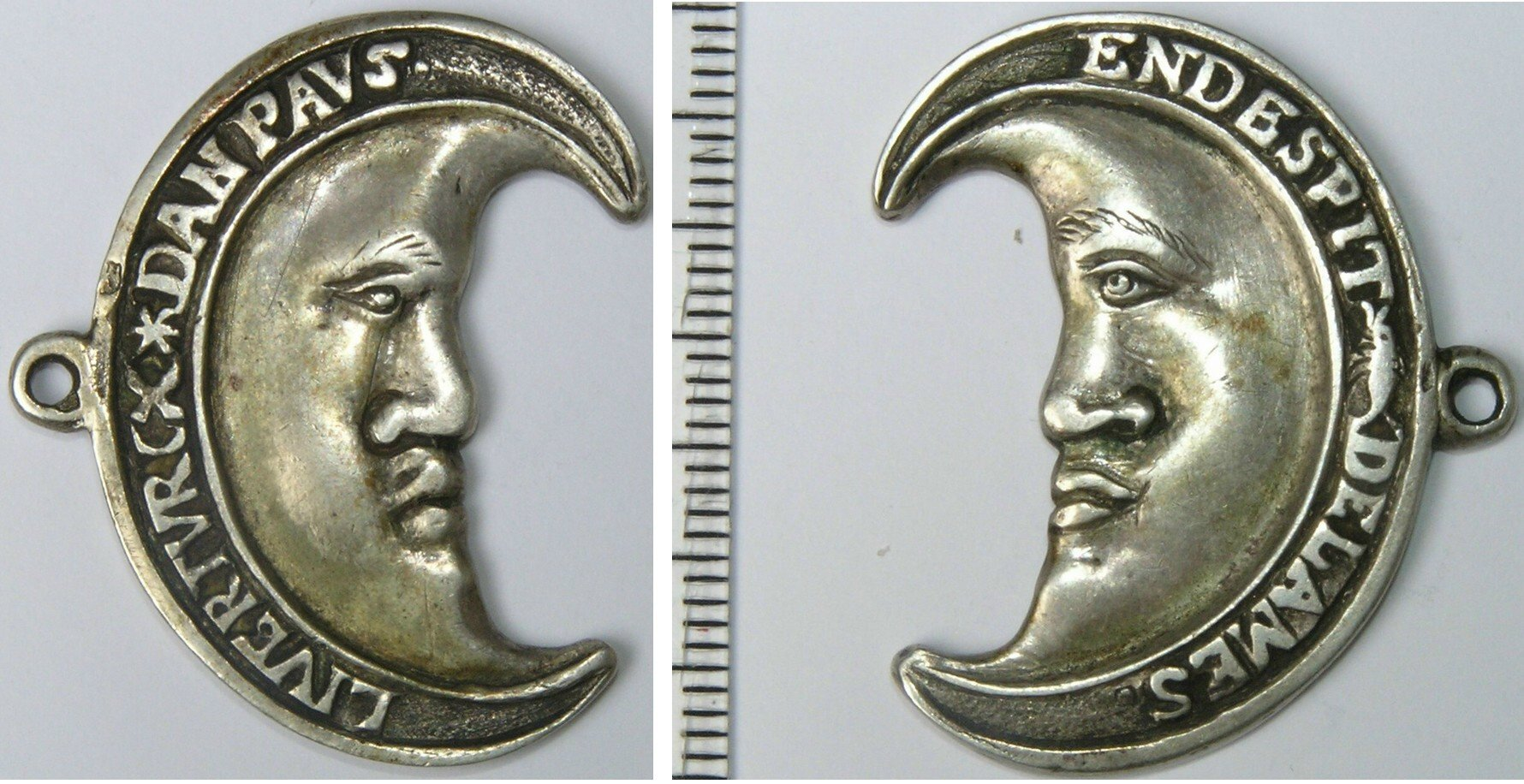
A Dutch crescent-shaped Geuzen medal at the time of the anti-Spanish Dutch Revolt, with the slogan "Liever Turks dan Paaps" ("Rather Turkish than Papist"), 1570

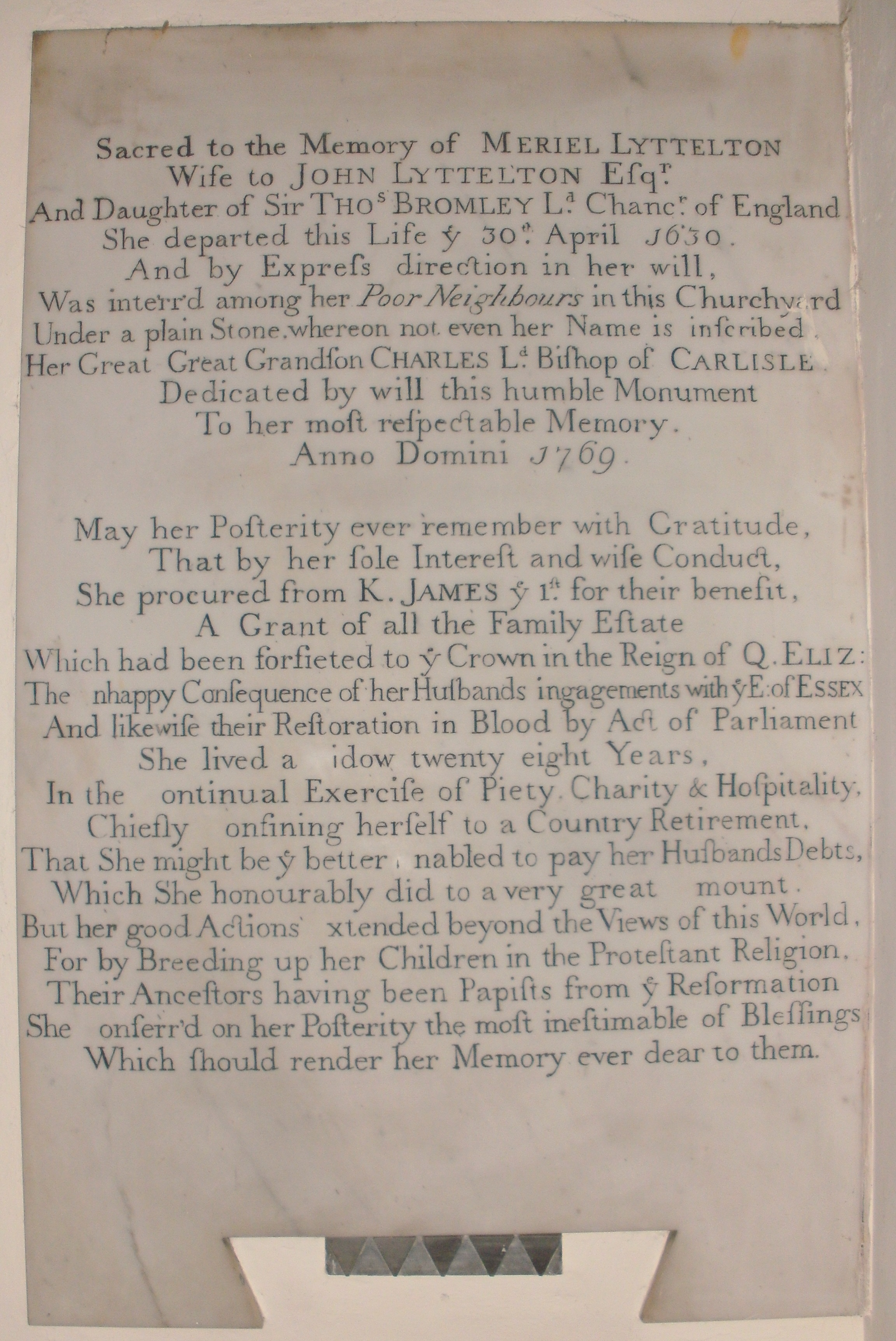
St John the Baptist Church, Hagley, memorial to Meriel Lyttelton (a daughter of Thomas Bromley) from 1769, remembered "for Breeding up her Children in the Protestant Religion, Their Ancestors having been Papists"

According to the Oxford English Dictionary, the word Papist was first used in 1528.

The word was in common use by Protestant writers until the mid-nineteenth century, as shown by its frequent appearance in Thomas Macaulay's History of England from the Accession of James II and in other works of that period, including those with no sectarian bias.

The word is found in certain surviving statutes of the United Kingdom, for example in the English Bill of Rights of 1689 and the Scottish Claim of Right of 1689. Catholics have been excluded from the British throne for centuries. In 1701, Parliament passed the Act of Settlement, which requires that only a Protestant monarch could rule over England and Ireland. Under the Act of Settlement of 1701, no one who professes "the popish religion" may succeed to the throne of the Kingdom of England and the Act continues to apply to the United Kingdom and all of the Commonwealth Realms; until the Succession to the Crown Act 2013 amended it with effect from 2015, the Act of Settlement also banned from the throne anyone who married "a papist". Fears that Roman Catholic secular leaders would be anti-Protestant and would be unduly influenced from Rome arose after all allegiance to the Pope was banned in England in the reigns of Henry VIII and Elizabeth I. Jonathan Swift (1667–1745), the author of Gulliver's Travels, employed the term in his satirical essay A Modest Proposal, in which he proposed selling Irish babies to be eaten by wealthy English landlords. Daniel Defoe wrote in the popular Robinson Crusoe (1719), near the end of the novel: "[...] I began to regret having professed myself a Papist, and thought it might not be the best religion to die with."

Similar terms, such as the traditional popery and the more recent papalism, are sometimes used, as in the Popery Act 1698 and the Irish Popery Act. The Seventh-day Adventist prophetess Ellen G. White used the terms papist and popery throughout her book The Great Controversy, a volume harshly criticized for its anti-Catholic tone.

During the American presidential election of 1928, the Democratic nominee Al Smith was labeled a papist by his political opponents. He was the first Roman Catholic ever to gain the presidential nomination of a major party, and this led to fears that, if he were elected, the United States government would follow the dictates of the Vatican. As of 2022, John F. Kennedy and Joe Biden are the only Roman Catholics to have been elected President of the United States.

The term is still sometimes used today, although much less often than in earlier centuries.

== Crypto-Papism ==
In early use the term appeared in the compound form "Crypto-Papist", referring to members of Reformed, Protestant, or nonconformist churches who at heart were allegedly Roman Catholics. Alexis Khomiakhov, a Russian lay theologian of the nineteenth century, claimed that "All Protestants are Crypto-Papists".

Although the term has been used as a means of attacking Protestants with high church sympathies, such as William Laud and John Spottiswoode, at other times there have been individuals who have secretly converted to Catholicism, for example, James II of England, Bartholomew Remov and Yelizaveta Rostopchina. Some people may later on openly convert, such as George Calvert, 1st Baron Baltimore, or secretly convert with reservations, such as John III of Sweden.

== See also ==
- List of Anglican bishops who converted to Roman Catholicism
- A free admonition without any fees / To warne the Papistes to beware of three trees, a 16th-century broadside ballad

=== Established uses and related topics ===
- Popish Plot
- Popish soap
- Papists Act 1740
- Popery Act 1627
- Popery Act 1698
- Papal supremacy
- Romanism
- Black Legend

=== Pejorative terms for Roman Catholics ===
- Bead puller
- the Dago (slur) for South European (Italian, Portuguese and Spanish) Christians
- Mackerel snapper
- Mariolater
- Romish
- Taig or Teague
- Dogan (refers specifically to Irish Roman Catholics)
