= The Wandering Virgin =

Song

- Genre: Broadside ballad
- Melody: Over Hills and High Mountains; Ah! Chloris Awake
- Published: Late 1700s: England

The Wandering Virgin is an English broadside ballad from the late 17th century. The narrator warns fellow virgins not to be too coy unless they also want to wander the world round looking for the lover who has given up on their courtship. She tells the story of how she dresses like a man and travels over sea, land, desert, and forest to find her love. Sung to the tune of Over Hills and High Mountains, or Ah! Chloris Awake, depending on the broadside. Copies of the broadside are available in National Library of Scotland, the University of Glasgow Library, the British Library, and Magdalene College, Cambridge.

== Synopsis ==
The ballad is written as a warning. The narrator asks virgins to hear her tale and learn from it. Because she acted too coy, the man she loves has gone away, and now she must spend her life traveling the world looking for him. She cuts her dress into breeches and cuts her hair short, gets a switch, a sword, and a horse, so that she is able to travel freely as a man. She tells of how much she loves the man she has lost. She sings of his curly locks, his musical voice, and his smooth ability to woo her. The rest of the ballad tells of all the places she will travel: throughout England, overseas, into jungles, deserts, forests. She says she cannot live without him. At the end of the ballad, she reiterates her warning to other women, lest they also spend their lives wandering the world looking for lost love.

== Cultural and historical relevance ==
In some copies of The Wandering Virgin, it is cited as a reply to an earlier ballad, The Wandering Maiden. Joseph Woodfall Ebsworth calls it a "continuation" of the earlier ballad.
