= Tis A Plaine Case Gentlemen =

Tis A Plaine Case Gentlemen is an English broadside ballad housed in the Huntington Library. It was originally printed by Stephen Bukley in 1643, and is well known for its opening lines: "OH the distraction of this Factious age! / Have not wile-men (who are starke mad with rage, / Brought this faire Land to such a combustion, / That through their means we may feare confusion.".

== Synopsis ==
Tis A Plaine Case Gentlemen is, at its core, a royalist broadside ballad. It decries the current (1643) political and religious state of London. The speaker asserts that London's current woes are brought on by both religious division and the peoples' lack of faith in their king and parliament. Though the Protestant Reformation was nearing its end, it was still a considerable driving force in political and religious thought. The ballad claims that the common folk, as opposed to the king and parliament, are responsible for their own troubles because each private individual is taking on the mantle of king for themselves, which is blasphemous in the eyes of God and ignores the Great Chain of Being that many royalist supporters believed in. The ballad concludes by claiming that those who harm their sovereign in turn harm themselves.
