= When the King Enjoys His Own Again =

English Civil War Cavalier ballad

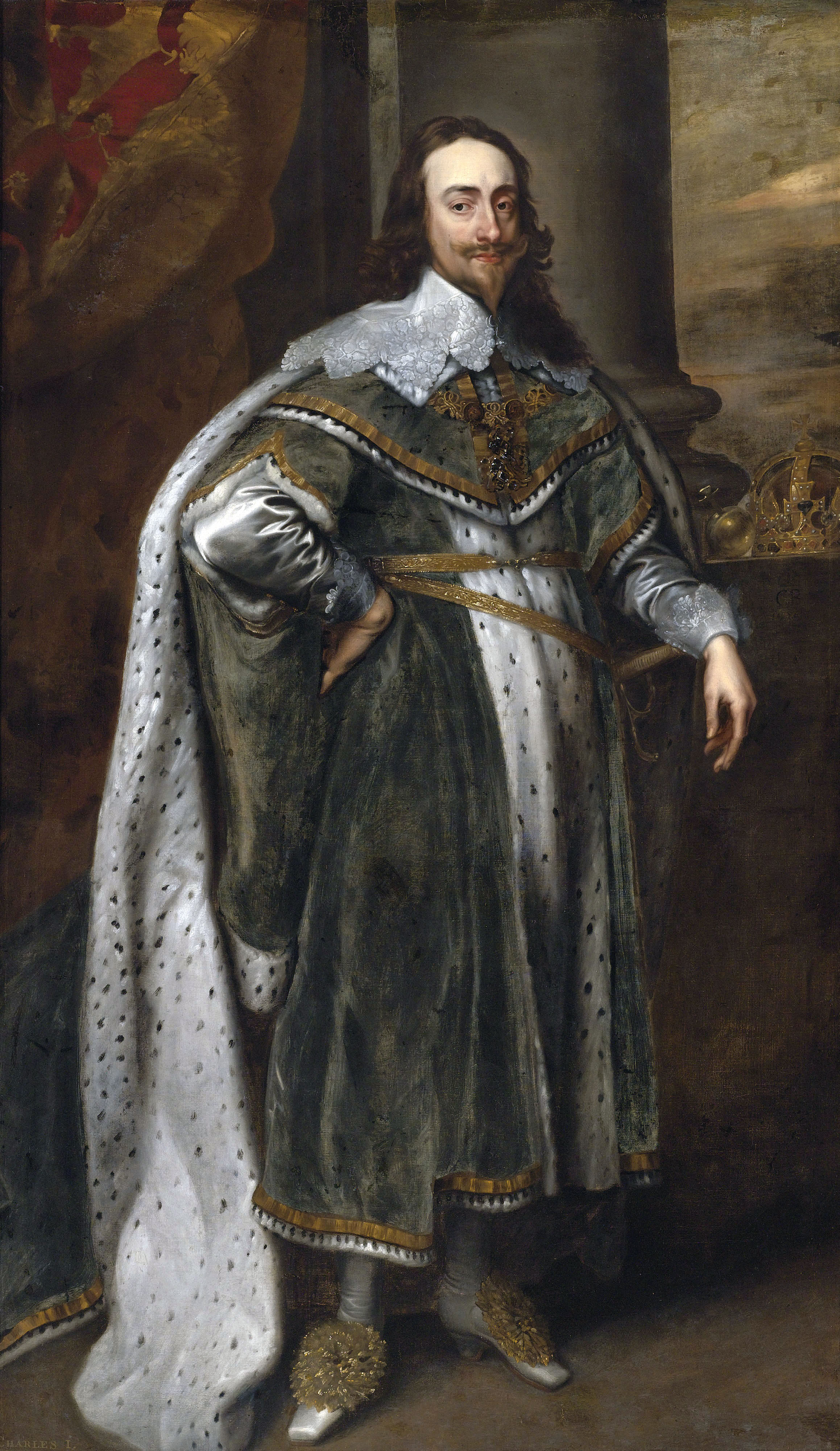
King Charles I of England, whom the song was written in support of

"When the King Enjoys His Own Again" (alternatively "The King Shall Enjoy His Own Again") is an English pro-Cavalier ballad. It was written by the ballad writer Martin Parker during the English Civil War. It was first published between 1643 and 1647 under the title "Upon Defacing of Whitehall" and called for supporting Charles I of England.

== Origins ==
The lyrics to the song were written by Martin Parker, a ballad writer. He was born around 1600 and had his first ballads published in 1624 or 1625. "When the King Enjoys His Own Again" was written between 1643 and 1647, in a set of five stanzas, under the title "Upon Defacing of Whitehall". The song's attribution to Parker is derived from the following line in the 1647 pamphlet Gossips’ Feast:

By my faith, Martin Parker never got a fairer treat: no, not when he indited that sweet ballad, When the King enjoys his own again.

At the time, it would have been dangerous for Parker to publish the song with his name attached. He wrote the song in support of King Charles I of England at a time when support for him was declining.

Parker's lyrics were set to the song "Marry Me, Marry Me, Quoth the Bonnie Lass". The song was popular at the time and can be found in the Skene Manuscript, published during the reign of Charles I. As "Upon Defacing of Whitehall" was reprinted, it became known as its traditional title "When the King Enjoys His Own Again". The song was also known, with altered lyrics, under the title "When the King Comes Home in Peace Again". It is known as that in the Roxburghe Collection of Ballads, published 1671. It was likely written shortly after Parker's original ballad.

== Usage ==
The song was widely parodied and imitated for about two hundred years.

=== Cavalier ===
The song was written originally to support Charles I, but it was generally used to "keep up the spirits of the Cavaliers". It also promoted the ascension of Charles I's son, Charles II, to the English throne. The song continued to circulate in secret during the republican Commonwealth of England and was later reprinted widely in England and Scotland immediately before and following the Stuart Restoration in 1660. The song remained immensely popular after the restoration. Following the Glorious Revolution of 1688, the song became an anthem of support for the exiled James II.

The song's lyrics sang the king's praises and prognosticated his eventual victory in the civil wars. The phrase "the king's own" refers to the legitimate divine rights, temporal authority and property of Charles I and the Crown, which at the time were being contested by the rival authority of Parliament. The lyrics argue that the ongoing wars and troubles in England will not cease until the King is rightfully reinstated to his throne and traditional order is restored.

=== Jacobite ===
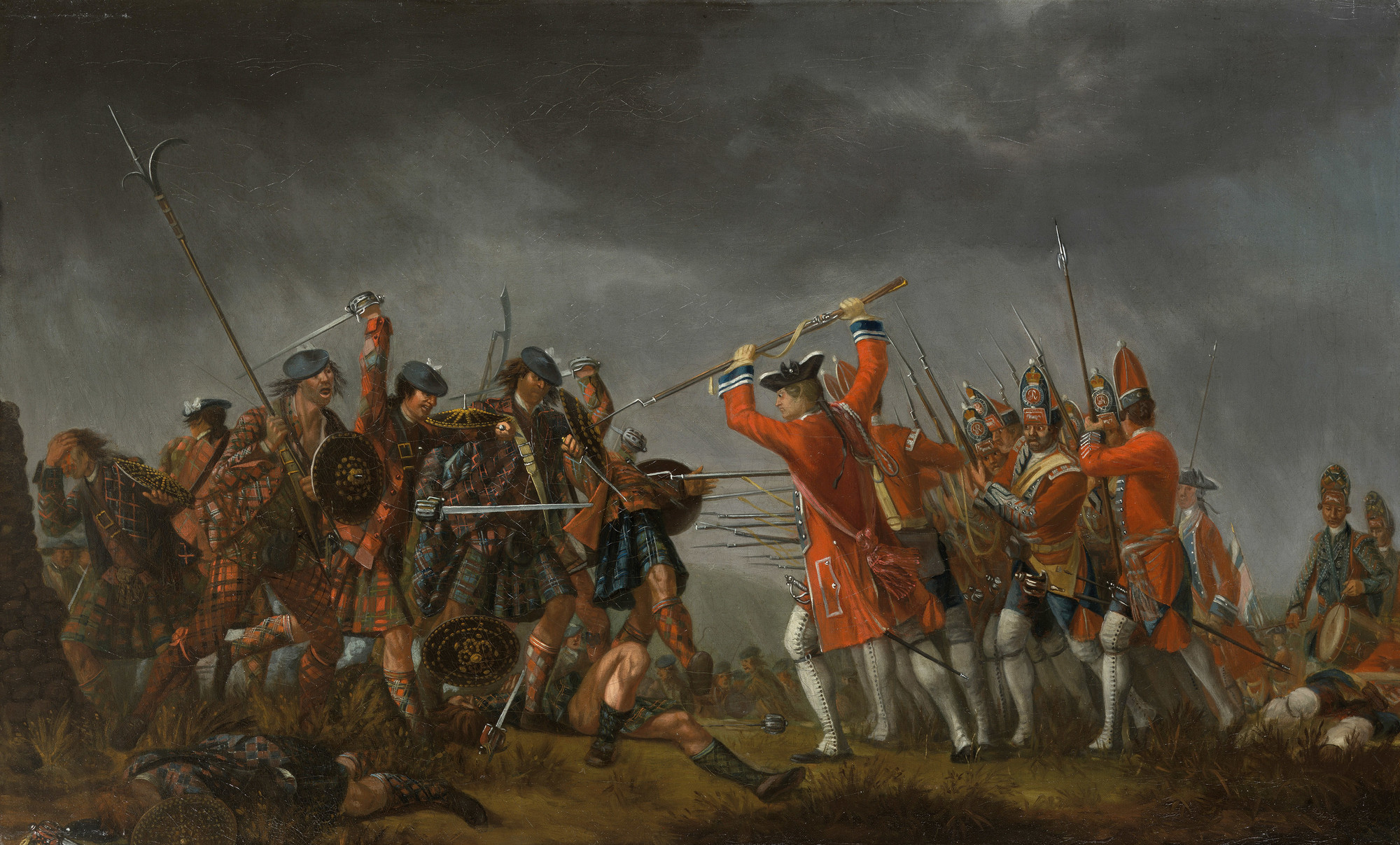
Jacobites in the 1764 Battle of Culloden

After the Glorious Revolution, a regiment of Irish Jacobites used the song as their march. The Canadian academic historian Paul Monod recorded a wide amount of uses of the song in his book 1993 book Jacobitism and the English People 1688-1788, largely around political events. The song was sung after the death of Queen Mary II in 1694, after the ascension of George I to the British throne in 1714, during the Jacobite uprising of 1715. According to the historian Daniel Szechi, this was the most popular Jacobite song of the period. The antiquary Joseph Ritson observed that "nothing fed the enthusiasm of the Jacobites... in every corner of Great Britain, more than "The King shall enjoy his own again"."

== Original lyrics ==
Let rogues and cheats prognosticate
Concerning king's or kingdom's fate
I think myself to be as wise
As he that gazeth on the skies
My sight goes beyond
The depth of a pond
Or rivers in the greatest rain
Whereby I can tell
That all will be well
When the King enjoys his own again
Yes, this I can tell
That all will be well
When the King enjoys his own again

There's neither Swallow, Dove, or Dade
Can soar more high or deeper wade
Nor show a reason from the stars
What causeth peace or civil wars
The man in the moon
May wear out his shoon
By running after Charles's wain
But all's to no end,
For the times will not mend
Till the King enjoys his own again
Yes, this I can tell
That all will be well
When the King enjoys his own again

Full forty years this royal crown
Hath been his father's and his own
And is there anyone but he
That in the same should sharer be?
For who better may
The sceptre sway
Than he that hath such right to reign?
Then let's hope for a peace,
For the wars will not cease
Till the king enjoys his own again
Yes, this I can tell
That all will be well
When the King enjoys his own again

Though for a time we see Whitehall
With cobwebs hanging on the wall
Instead of gold and silver brave
Which formerly he was wont to have
With rich perfume
In every room,
Delightful to that princely train
Yet the old again shall be
When the time you see
That the King enjoys his own again
Yes, this I can tell
That all will be well
When the King enjoys his own again

Then fears avaunt, upon the hill
My hope shall cast her anchor still
Until I see some peaceful dove
Bring home the branch I dearly love
Then will I wait
Till the waters abate
Which now disturb my troubled brain
Then for ever rejoice,
When I've heard the voice
That the King enjoys his own again
Yes, this I can tell
That all will be well
When the King enjoys his own again
