= Martin Parker =

English ballad writer (c. 1600-c. 1656)

Martin Parker (c. 1600 – c. 1656) was an English ballad writer, and probably a London tavern-keeper.

== Life ==
About 1625 he seems to have begun publishing ballads, a large number of which bearing his signature or his initials, M.P., are preserved in the British Museum. John Dryden considered him the best ballad writer of his time. His sympathies were with the Royalist cause during the Civil War, and it was in support of the declining fortunes of Charles I of England that he wrote the best known of his ballads, When the king enjoys his own again, which he first published in 1643, and which, after enjoying great popularity at the Restoration, became a favorite Jacobite song in the 18th century. Parker also wrote a nautical ballad, Sailors for my Money, which in a revised version survives as When the stormy winds do blow. It is not known when he died, but the appearance in 1656 of a funeral elegy, in which the ballad writer was satirically celebrated is perhaps a correct indication of the date of his death.
