= Broadside ballad =

Single sheet of paper printed on one side

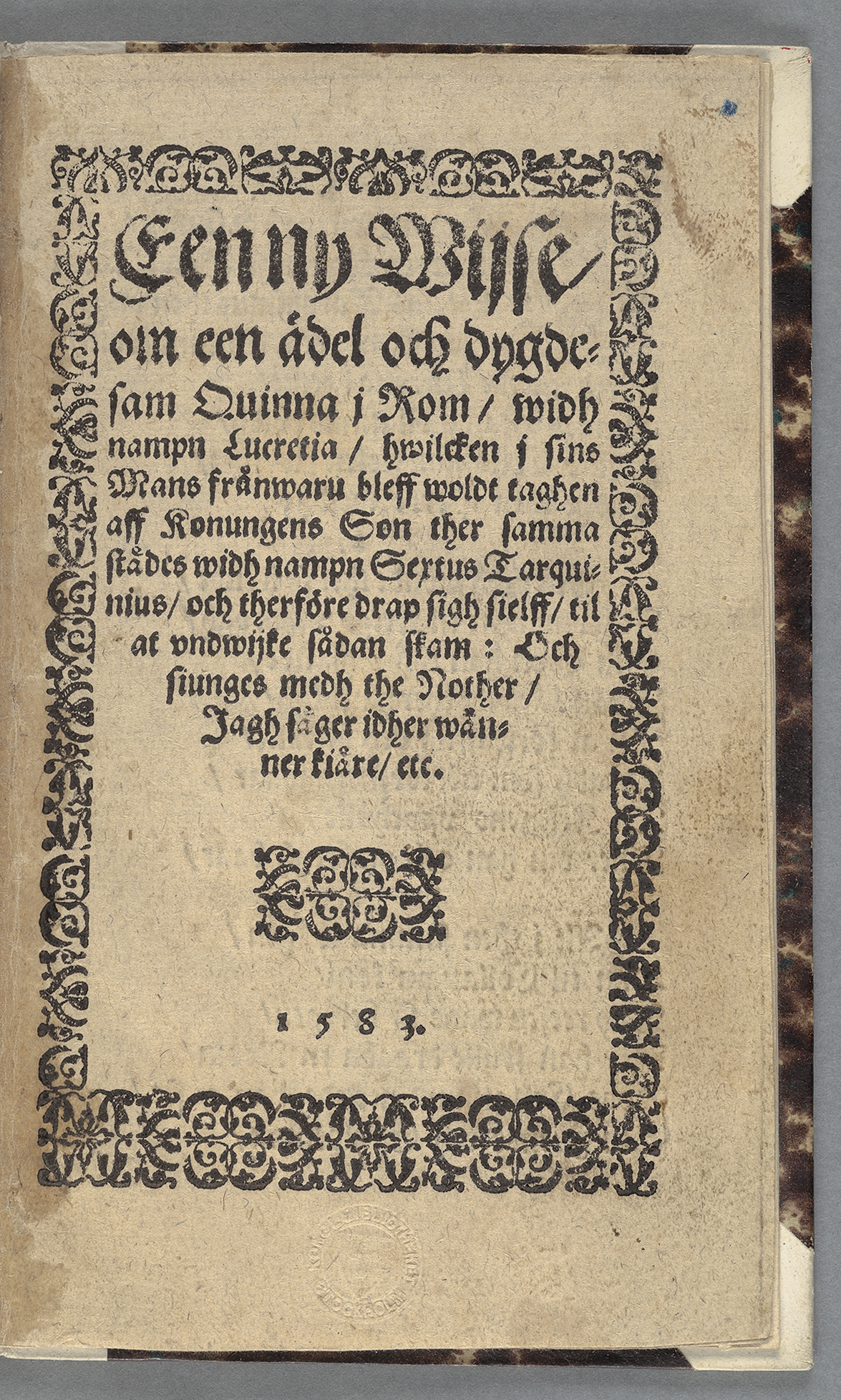
The oldest preserved Swedish broadside ballad, printed in 1583.

A broadside (also known as a broadsheet) is a single sheet of inexpensive paper printed on one side, often with a ballad, rhyme, news and sometimes with woodcut illustrations. They were one of the most common forms of printed material between the sixteenth and nineteenth centuries, particularly in Britain, Ireland and North America because they are easy to produce and are often associated with one of the most important forms of traditional music from these countries, the ballad. They were also common across Scandinavia and the rest of Europe.

== Development of broadsides ==
Ballads developed out of minstrelsy from the fourteenth and fifteenth century. These were narrative poems that had combined with French courtly romances and Germanic legends that were popular at the King's court, as well as in the halls of lords of the realm. By the seventeenth century, minstrelsy had evolved into ballads whose authors wrote on a variety of topics. The authors could then have their ballads printed and distributed. Printers used a single piece of paper known as a broadside, hence the name broadside ballads. It was common for ballads to have crude woodcuts at the top of a broadside. Historians Fumerton and Gerrini show just how popular broadsides had been in early modern England: the ballads printed numbered in the millions. The ballads did not stay just in London but spread to the English countryside. Owing to the printing press, publishing large amounts of broadsides became easier. Commoners were frequently exposed to ballads, in either song or print, as they were ubiquitous in London.

The invention of the printing press helped the broadsides to become so popular. This new technology helped printers to produce these ballads cheaply and in mass quantities. Historian Adrian Johns explains the printing process as well as how and where people of this time bought ballads. The ballads retailed on the streets of London or in village squares for up to a penny, meaning almost everyone could afford this cheap form of entertainment. In the seventeenth century, people called "Stationers" printed and published in the same place. Stationers had great control over what was printed. Protestant or Catholic printers would publish broadsides in favor of their beliefs. This worked the same for political beliefs.

== The nature of broadsides ==
With primitive early printing presses, printing on a single sheet of paper was the easiest and most inexpensive form of printing available and for much of their history could be sold for as little as a penny. They could also be cut in half lengthways to make 'broadslips', or folded to make chapbooks and where these contained several songs such collections were known as 'garlands'.

The earliest broadsides that survive date from the early sixteenth century, but relatively few survive from before 1550. From 1556 the Stationers Company in London attempted to force registration of all ballads and some 2,000 were recorded between then and 1600, but, since they were easy to print and distribute, it is likely that far more were printed. Scholars often distinguish between the earlier blackletter broadsides, using larger heavy 'gothic' print, most common up to the middle of the seventeenth century, and lighter whiteletter, roman or italic typefaces, that were easier to read and became common thereafter. A centre of broadside production was the Seven Dials area of London.

Broadsides were produced in huge numbers, with over 400,000 being sold in England annually by the 1660s, probably close to their peak of popularity. Many were sold by travelling chapmen in city streets and at fairs or by balladeers, who sang the songs printed on their broadsides in an attempt to attract customers. In Britain broadsides began to decline in popularity in the seventeenth century as initially chapbooks and later bound books and newspapers, began to replace them, until they appear to have died out in the nineteenth century. They lasted longer in Ireland, and although never produced in such huge numbers in North America, they were significant in the eighteenth century and provided an important medium of propaganda, on both sides, in the American War of Independence.

Most of the knowledge of broadsides in England comes from the fact that several significant figures chose to collect them, including Samuel Pepys (1633–1703), Robert Harley, 1st Earl of Oxford and Mortimer (1661–1724), in what became Roxburghe Ballads. In the eighteenth century there were several printed collections, including Thomas D'Urfey's Wit and Mirth: or, Pills to Purge Melancholy (1719–20), Bishop Thomas Percy's Reliques of Ancient English Poetry (1765), and Joseph Ritson's, The Bishopric Garland (1784). In Scotland similar work was undertaken by figures including Robert Burns and Walter Scott in Minstrelsy of the Scottish Border (1802–03). One of the largest collections was made by Sir Frederick Madden who collected some 30,000 songs now in the 'Madden Collection' in the Cambridge University Library. The mid-20th-century American singer-songwriter Phil Ochs described his own songs and those of Tom Paxton, Pete Seeger, Leonard Cohen, and Graeme Allwright as contemporary equivalents of broadside ballads.

== Broadside ballads ==
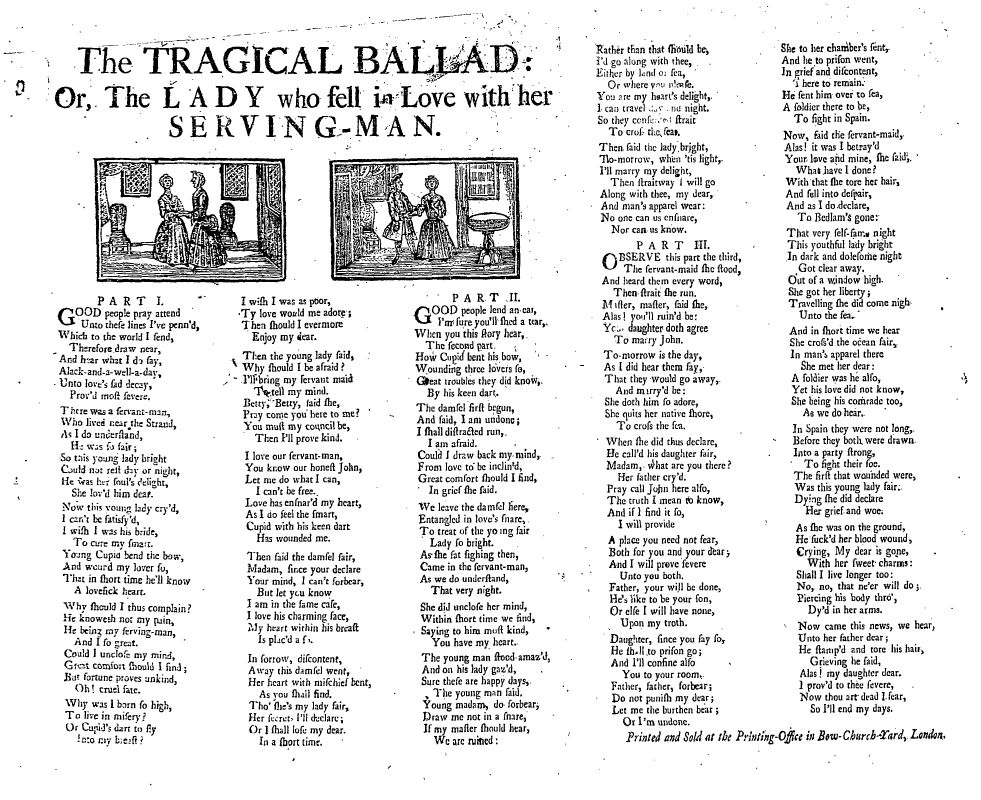
An eighteenth-century broadside ballad

Broadside ballads (also known as 'roadsheet', 'broadsheet', 'stall', 'vulgar' or 'come all ye' ballads) varied from what has been defined as the 'traditional' ballad, which were often tales of some antiquity, which has frequently crossed national and cultural boundaries and developed as part of a process of oral transmission. In contrast broadside ballads often lacked their epic nature, tended not to possess their artistic qualities and usually dealt with less consequential topics. However, confusingly many 'traditional' ballads, as defined particularly by the leading collectors, Svend Grundtvig for Denmark and Francis Child for England and Scotland, only survive as broadsides. Among the topics of broadside ballads were love, religion, drinking-songs, legends, and early journalism, which included disasters, political events and signs, wonders and prodigies. For example, news ballads about Great Train Wreck of 1856 were published both in the USA and in Norway. Generally broadside ballads included only the lyrics, often with the name of a known tune that would fit suggested below the title. Music critic Peter Gammond has written:

Although the broadsides occasionally printed traditional 'rural' ballads, the bulk of them were of urban origin, written by the journalistic hacks of the day to cover such news as a robbery or a hanging, to moralize, or simply to offer entertainment. In their diversity they covered all the duties of the modern newspaper. The use of crude verse or doggerel was common, as this was thought to heighten the dramatic impact. The verses themselves would be based on the rhythms of various traditional airs that were in common circulation, sometimes credited, occasionally with the melody line printed. This gave the verses shape and substance and helped to make them memorable. A widely known tune like 'Greensleeves' was frequently used in this way; and the more popular items were employed ad nauseam.

== Notable broadside ballads ==
=== 16th century ===
- A free admonition without any fees / To warne the Papistes to beware of three trees

=== 17th century ===
- A Voyage to Virginia
- An Admirable New Northern Story
- Coridon and Parthenia
- Cromwell's Panegyrick
- The Last News from France
- Tis A Plaine Case Gentlemen
- 'Tis Money makes a Man: Or, The Good-Fellows Folly
- On the Death of His Grace, the Duke of Albemarle
- The Old Man's Complaint Against His Wretched Son, Who to Advance His Marriage Did Undo Himself
- News From Hide-Park
- Neptune's Raging Fury
- The Clarret Drinkers Song: Or, The Good Fellows Design
- The Honour of a London Prentice
- The Low Country Soldier
- The Wandering Virgin

=== 18th century ===
- Ralph and Nell's Ramble to Oxford

== See also ==
- Koa-á books
- Street literature
- Shirburn Ballads
- Popular prints
- List of Irish ballads
